= Braille pattern dots-2356 =

Braille pattern

6-dot braille cells
⠀	⠁	⠃	⠉	⠙	⠑	⠋	⠛	⠓	⠊	⠚	⠈	⠘
⠄	⠅	⠇	⠍	⠝	⠕	⠏	⠟	⠗	⠎	⠞	⠌	⠜
⠤	⠥	⠧	⠭	⠽	⠵	⠯	⠿	⠷	⠮	⠾	⠬	⠼
⠠	⠡	⠣	⠩	⠹	⠱	⠫	⠻	⠳	⠪	⠺	⠨	⠸
shift down	⠂	⠆	⠒	⠲	⠢	⠖	⠶	⠦	⠔	⠴	⠐	⠰

The Braille pattern dots-2356 ( ⠶ ) is a 6-dot braille cell with both middle and both bottom dots raised, or an 8-dot braille cell with both upper-middle and both lower-middle dots raised. It is represented by the Unicode code point U+2836, and in Braille ASCII with the number 7.

Character information
Preview	⠶ (braille pattern dots-2356)	
Unicode name	BRAILLE PATTERN DOTS-2356	
Encodings	decimal	hex
Unicode	10294	U+2836
UTF-8	226 160 182	E2 A0 B6
Numeric character reference	&#10294;	&#x2836;
Braille ASCII	55	37

== Unified Braille ==
In unified international braille, the braille pattern dots-2356 is used for punctuation, or otherwise as needed.

=== Table of unified braille values ===
French Braille	" (quote mark), math) = (equal sign), -gn-, "été"
English Braille	(, ) (parentheses), -gg-
English Contraction	were
German Braille	eh
Bharati Braille	[,

(brackets)

|- |- ! align=left| IPA Braille | square diacritic sign |- ! align=left| Russian Braille | (, ) (parentheses) |- ! align=left| Slovak Braille | " (quote mark) |- ! align=left| Arabic Braille | [, |} (brackets) |- |- |- ! align=left| Thai Braille | ๊ (tone 3) |- |}

== Other braille ==
Japanese Braille	(, ) (parentheses)
Korean Braille	-ng / ㅇ
Mainland Chinese Braille	wang, -uang
Taiwanese Braille	wai, -uai / ㄨㄞ
Two-Cell Chinese Braille	pi-
Nemeth Braille	7
Gardner Salinas Braille	? (question mark)

== Plus dots 7 and 8 ==
Related to Braille pattern dots-2356 are Braille patterns 23567, 23568, and 235678, which are used in 8-dot braille systems, such as Gardner-Salinas and Luxembourgish Braille.

Character information
Preview	⡶ (braille pattern dots-23567)		⢶ (braille pattern dots-23568)		⣶ (braille pattern dots-235678)	
Unicode name	BRAILLE PATTERN DOTS-23567		BRAILLE PATTERN DOTS-23568		BRAILLE PATTERN DOTS-235678	
Encodings	decimal	hex	dec	hex	dec	hex
Unicode	10358	U+2876	10422	U+28B6	10486	U+28F6
UTF-8	226 161 182	E2 A1 B6	226 162 182	E2 A2 B6	226 163 182	E2 A3 B6
Numeric character reference	&#10358;	&#x2876;	&#10422;	&#x28B6;	&#10486;	&#x28F6;

	dots 23567	dots 23568	dots 235678
Gardner Salinas Braille	~	≈ (approximately equal)	= (equal sign)

== Related 8-dot kantenji patterns ==
In the Japanese kantenji braille, the standard 8-dot Braille patterns 3678, 13678, 34678, and 134678 are the patterns related to Braille pattern dots-2356, since the two additional dots of kantenji patterns 02356, 23567, and 023567 are placed above the base 6-dot cell, instead of below, as in standard 8-dot braille.

Character information
Preview	⣤ (braille pattern dots-3678)		⣥ (braille pattern dots-13678)		⣬ (braille pattern dots-34678)		⣭ (braille pattern dots-134678)	
Unicode name	BRAILLE PATTERN DOTS-3678		BRAILLE PATTERN DOTS-13678		BRAILLE PATTERN DOTS-34678		BRAILLE PATTERN DOTS-134678	
Encodings	decimal	hex	dec	hex	dec	hex	dec	hex
Unicode	10468	U+28E4	10469	U+28E5	10476	U+28EC	10477	U+28ED
UTF-8	226 163 164	E2 A3 A4	226 163 165	E2 A3 A5	226 163 172	E2 A3 AC	226 163 173	E2 A3 AD
Numeric character reference	&#10468;	&#x28E4;	&#10469;	&#x28E5;	&#10476;	&#x28EC;	&#10477;	&#x28ED;

=== Kantenji using braille patterns 3678, 13678, 34678, or 134678 ===
This listing includes kantenji using Braille pattern dots-2356 for all 6349 kanji found in JIS C 6226-1978.

- - 囲

==== Variants and thematic compounds ====
- - selector 1 + 囗 = 伐
- - selector 2 + 囗 = 戎
- - selector 3 + 囗 = 弋
- - selector 4 + 囗 = 戈
- - selector 5 + 囗 = 冂
- - selector 6 + 囗 = 亶
- - 囗 + selector 1 = 我
- - 囗 + selector 2 = 式
- - 囗 + selector 3 = 用
- - 囗 + selector 4 = 或
- - 囗 + selector 5 = 戔
- - 囗 + selector 6 = 角
- - 比 + 囗 = 凹

==== Compounds of 囲 and 囗 ====
- - 囗 + な/亻 = 囚
  - - に/氵 + 囗 + な/亻 = 泅
- - 囗 + れ/口 = 回
  - - 囗 + 囗 + れ/口 = 囘
  - - な/亻 + 囗 + れ/口 = 嗇
    - - へ/⺩ + 囗 = 牆
    - - つ/土 + 囗 + れ/口 = 墻
    - - き/木 + 囗 + れ/口 = 檣
    - - ふ/女 + 囗 + れ/口 = 艢
    - - 心 + 囗 + れ/口 = 薔
  - - ゆ/彳 + 囗 + れ/口 = 徊
  - - て/扌 + 囗 + れ/口 = 擅
  - - ね/示 + 囗 + れ/口 = 禀
  - - の/禾 + 囗 + れ/口 = 稟
    - - る/忄 + 囗 + れ/口 = 懍
    - - よ/广 + 囗 + れ/口 = 廩
  - - く/艹 + 囗 + れ/口 = 茴
  - - む/車 + 囗 + れ/口 = 蛔
  - - ひ/辶 + 囗 + れ/口 = 迴
  - - お/頁 + 囗 + れ/口 = 顫
- - 囗 + け/犬 = 因
  - - れ/口 + 囗 + け/犬 = 咽
  - - も/門 + 囗 + け/犬 = 氤
  - - 火 + 囗 + け/犬 = 烟
  - - く/艹 + 囗 + け/犬 = 茵
- - 囗 + て/扌 = 団
  - - 囗 + 囗 + て/扌 = 團
- - 囗 + ほ/方 = 囮
- - 囗 + き/木 = 困
  - - る/忄 + 囗 + き/木 = 悃
  - - き/木 + 囗 + き/木 = 梱
- - 囗 + 龸 = 図
  - - 囗 + 囗 + 龸 = 圖
- - 囗 + ろ/十 = 固
  - - な/亻 + 囗 = 個
  - - 氷/氵 + 囗 + ろ/十 = 凅
  - - に/氵 + 囗 + ろ/十 = 涸
  - - や/疒 + 囗 + ろ/十 = 痼
  - - か/金 + 囗 + ろ/十 = 錮
- - 囗 + へ/⺩ = 国
  - - 囗 + 囗 + へ/⺩ = 國
    - - し/巿 + 囗 + へ/⺩ = 幗
    - - ⺼ + 囗 + へ/⺩ = 膕
  - - て/扌 + 囗 + へ/⺩ = 掴
  - - き/木 + 囗 + へ/⺩ = 椢
- - 囗 + さ/阝 = 圏
  - - 囗 + 囗 + さ/阝 = 圈
- - 囗 + え/訁 = 園
  - - く/艹 + 囗 + え/訁 = 薗
- - く/艹 + 囗 = 菌
- - selector 1 + 囗 + へ/⺩ = 囗
- - 囗 + 仁/亻 + ろ/十 = 囹
- - 囗 + ろ/十 + ら/月 = 囿
- - 囗 + 龸 + ほ/方 = 圀
- - 囗 + 宿 + ほ/方 = 圃
- - 囗 + ら/月 + れ/口 = 圄
- - 囗 + つ/土 + か/金 = 圉
- - 囗 + 宿 + い/糹/#2 = 圍
- - 囗 + 宿 + る/忄 = 圜
- - に/氵 + 宿 + 囗 = 溷
- - の/禾 + 宿 + 囗 = 穡
- - ち/竹 + 龸 + 囗 = 箘
- - さ/阝 + 宿 + 囗 = 鄙
- - 囗 + そ/馬 + 比 = 麕

==== Compounds of 伐 ====
- - ね/示 + 囗 = 袋
- - を/貝 + 囗 = 貸
- - も/門 + 囗 = 閥
- - 仁/亻 + 囗 = 代
  - - つ/土 + 仁/亻 + 囗 = 垈
  - - や/疒 + 仁/亻 + 囗 = 岱
  - - へ/⺩ + 仁/亻 + 囗 = 玳
  - - し/巿 + 仁/亻 + 囗 = 黛
- - ち/竹 + 宿 + 囗 = 筏

==== Compounds of 戎 ====
- - い/糹/#2 + 宿 + 囗 = 絨

==== Compounds of 弋 ====
- - 囗 + い/糹/#2 = 弐
  - - selector 1 + 囗 + い/糹/#2 = 弍
    - - 囗 + 囗 + い/糹/#2 = 貳
      - - ⺼ + 囗 + い/糹/#2 = 膩
- - 囗 + ん/止 = 武
  - - 龸 + 囗 + ん/止 = 斌
    - - を/貝 + 囗 + ん/止 = 贇
  - - か/金 + 囗 + ん/止 = 錻
- - ゐ/幺 + 囗 = 幾
  - - き/木 + 囗 = 機
  - - ま/石 + 囗 = 磯
  - - え/訁 + ゐ/幺 + 囗 = 譏
  - - せ/食 + ゐ/幺 + 囗 = 饑
- - 囗 + ゐ/幺 = 畿
- - き/木 + 龸 + 囗 = 杙
- - 囗 + 龸 + せ/食 = 鵡

==== Compounds of 戈 ====
- - と/戸 + 囗 = 戒
  - - え/訁 + と/戸 + 囗 = 誡
- - れ/口 + 囗 = 戦
  - - れ/口 + れ/口 + 囗 = 戰
- - す/発 + 囗 = 戯
  - - す/発 + す/発 + 囗 = 戲
- - selector 4 + 囗 + い/糹/#2 = 貮
- - を/貝 + selector 4 + 囗 = 戝
- - ろ/十 + selector 4 + 囗 = 戟
- - む/車 + selector 4 + 囗 = 戮
- - や/疒 + selector 4 + 囗 = 戳
- - て/扌 + selector 4 + 囗 = 找
- - お/頁 + 宿 + 囗 = 戛
- - お/頁 + 龸 + 囗 = 戞
- - も/門 + 宿 + 囗 = 戡

==== Compounds of 冂 ====
- - ろ/十 + 囗 = 再
  - - selector 1 + ろ/十 + 囗 = 冉
    - - く/艹 + ろ/十 + 囗 = 苒
- - た/⽥ + 囗 = 冑
- - 囗 + 仁/亻 = 内
  - - れ/口 + 囗 + 仁/亻 = 吶
  - - ⺼ + 囗 + 仁/亻 = 肭
  - - む/車 + 囗 + 仁/亻 = 蚋
  - - ね/示 + 囗 + 仁/亻 = 衲
  - - え/訁 + 囗 + 仁/亻 = 訥
  - - と/戸 + 囗 + 仁/亻 = 靹
- - 囗 + ね/示 = 剛
- - 囗 + と/戸 = 同
  - - 囗 + り/分 = 興
    - - 火 + 囗 + り/分 = 爨
    - - せ/食 + 囗 + り/分 = 釁
  - - る/忄 + 囗 + と/戸 = 恫
  - - に/氵 + 囗 + と/戸 = 洞
  - - の/禾 + 囗 + と/戸 = 粡
- - 囗 + こ/子 = 向
  - - せ/食 + 囗 + こ/子 = 餉
- - 囗 + つ/土 = 周
  - - 囗 + う/宀/#3 = 彫
    - - ち/竹 + 囗 + う/宀/#3 = 簓
  - - 氷/氵 + 囗 + つ/土 = 凋
  - - る/忄 + 囗 + つ/土 = 惆
  - - の/禾 + 囗 + つ/土 = 稠
  - - い/糹/#2 + 囗 + つ/土 = 綢
  - - む/車 + 囗 + つ/土 = 蜩
- - 囗 + の/禾 = 奥
  - - る/忄 + 囗 = 懊
  - - つ/土 + 囗 + の/禾 = 墺
  - - 囗 + 囗 + の/禾 = 奧
  - - に/氵 + 囗 + の/禾 = 澳
  - - 火 + 囗 + の/禾 = 燠
  - - ま/石 + 囗 + の/禾 = 礇
  - - も/門 + 囗 + の/禾 = 粤
  - - ね/示 + 囗 + の/禾 = 襖
- - 囗 + ゆ/彳 = 岡
  - - や/疒 + 囗 + ゆ/彳 = 崗
  - - き/木 + 囗 + ゆ/彳 = 棡
  - - 囗 + 囗 + ゆ/彳 = 堽
- - 囗 + め/目 = 爾
  - - ゆ/彳 + 囗 + め/目 = 彌
    - - 氷/氵 + 囗 + め/目 = 瀰
  - - に/氵 + 囗 + め/目 = 濔
  - - ね/示 + 囗 + め/目 = 禰
- - 囗 + 宿 + え/訁 = 冏
  - - 火 + 囗 + れ/口 = 烱
- - い/糹/#2 + 囗 + れ/口 = 絅
- - ひ/辶 + 囗 + こ/子 = 迥
- - 火 + 宿 + 囗 = 炯
- - ひ/辶 + 宿 + 囗 = 邇
- - 囗 + selector 4 + い/糹/#2 = 雕

==== Compounds of 亶 ====
- - 龸 + 囗 = 壇
- - 心 + 龸 + 囗 = 檀
- - 囗 + selector 4 + せ/食 = 氈
- - そ/馬 + 龸 + 囗 = 羶

==== Compounds of 我 ====
- - そ/馬 + 囗 = 義
  - - や/疒 + そ/馬 + 囗 = 嶬
  - - 日 + そ/馬 + 囗 = 曦
  - - ま/石 + そ/馬 + 囗 = 礒
  - - ふ/女 + そ/馬 + 囗 = 艤
- - む/車 + 囗 = 蛾
- - え/訁 + 囗 = 議
- - せ/食 + 囗 = 餓
- - な/亻 + 囗 + selector 1 = 俄
- - れ/口 + 囗 + selector 1 = 哦
- - ふ/女 + 囗 + selector 1 = 娥
- - や/疒 + 囗 + selector 1 = 峨
- - 心 + 囗 + selector 1 = 莪
- - 囗 + selector 1 + せ/食 = 鵝
- - や/疒 + 宿 + 囗 = 峩
- - 囗 + 宿 + せ/食 = 鵞

==== Compounds of 式 ====
- - ゑ/訁 + 囗 = 試
- - む/車 + 囗 + selector 2 = 軾
- - 囗 + め/目 + の/禾 = 弑
- - て/扌 + 宿 + 囗 = 拭

==== Compounds of 用 ====
- - よ/广 + 囗 = 庸
  - - な/亻 + よ/广 + 囗 = 傭
  - - る/忄 + よ/广 + 囗 = 慵
- - む/車 + 囗 + selector 3 = 蛹

==== Compounds of 或 ====
- - 囗 + 心 = 惑
- - も/門 + 囗 + selector 4 = 閾
- - 囗 + お/頁 + selector 4 = 馘

==== Compounds of 戔 ====
- - ほ/方 + 囗 = 残
  - - ほ/方 + ほ/方 + 囗 = 殘
- - に/氵 + 囗 = 浅
  - - に/氵 + に/氵 + 囗 = 淺
- - お/頁 + 囗 = 賎
  - - に/氵 + お/頁 + 囗 = 濺
- - み/耳 + 囗 = 践
  - - み/耳 + み/耳 + 囗 = 踐
- - か/金 + 囗 = 銭
  - - か/金 + か/金 + 囗 = 錢
- - き/木 + 宿 + 囗 = 桟
- - き/木 + selector 4 + 囗 = 棧
- - へ/⺩ + 宿 + 囗 = 牋
- - 囗 + 宿 + ⺼ = 盞
- - ち/竹 + selector 4 + 囗 = 箋
- - い/糹/#2 + 龸 + 囗 = 綫
- - を/貝 + 宿 + 囗 = 賤
- - せ/食 + 宿 + 囗 = 餞

==== Compounds of 角 ====
- - 囗 + そ/馬 = 解
  - - よ/广 + 囗 + そ/馬 = 廨
  - - る/忄 + 囗 + そ/馬 = 懈
  - - む/車 + 囗 + そ/馬 = 蟹
  - - ひ/辶 + 囗 + そ/馬 = 邂
  - - 囗 + そ/馬 + selector 2 = 觧
- - 囗 + む/車 = 触
  - - 囗 + 囗 + む/車 = 觸
- - 囗 + 数 = 觴
- - れ/口 + 囗 + selector 6 = 嘴
- - つ/土 + 囗 + selector 6 = 埆
- - き/木 + 囗 + selector 6 = 桷
- - 心 + 囗 + selector 6 = 槲
- - 囗 + 比 + と/戸 = 斛
- - む/車 + 龸 + 囗 = 蠏
- - 囗 + 宿 + こ/子 = 觚
- - 囗 + 比 + selector 4 = 觜
- - 囗 + selector 1 + ん/止 = 觝
- - 囗 + う/宀/#3 + せ/食 = 鵤

==== Compounds of 凹 ====
- - い/糹/#2 + 比 + 囗 = 雋

==== Compounds of 口 ====
- - う/宀/#3 + 囗 = 亮
  - - れ/口 + う/宀/#3 + 囗 = 喨
- - さ/阝 + 囗 = 叩
- - ぬ/力 + 囗 = 召
  - - ぬ/力 + ぬ/力 + 囗 = 劭
  - - そ/馬 + ぬ/力 + 囗 = 貂
  - - ひ/辶 + ぬ/力 + 囗 = 迢
  - - さ/阝 + ぬ/力 + 囗 = 邵
  - - ま/石 + ぬ/力 + 囗 = 韶
- - り/分 + 囗 = 合
  - - て/扌 + 囗 = 拾
  - - ち/竹 + 囗 = 答
  - - れ/口 + り/分 + 囗 = 哈
  - - ふ/女 + り/分 + 囗 = 姶
  - - や/疒 + り/分 + 囗 = 峇
  - - る/忄 + り/分 + 囗 = 恰
  - - て/扌 + り/分 + 囗 = 拿
  - - ん/止 + り/分 + 囗 = 歙
  - - に/氵 + り/分 + 囗 = 洽
  - - ⺼ + り/分 + 囗 = 盒
  - - ち/竹 + り/分 + 囗 = 箚
  - - の/禾 + り/分 + 囗 = 粭
  - - 心 + り/分 + 囗 = 荅
    - - と/戸 + り/分 + 囗 = 鞳
  - - む/車 + り/分 + 囗 = 蛤
  - - ね/示 + り/分 + 囗 = 袷
  - - も/門 + り/分 + 囗 = 閤
  - - ま/石 + り/分 + 囗 = 龕
- - し/巿 + 囗 = 吊
- - ふ/女 + 囗 = 否
  - - や/疒 + ふ/女 + 囗 = 痞
- - け/犬 + 囗 = 呑
- - つ/土 + 囗 = 喜
  - - な/亻 + つ/土 + 囗 = 僖
  - - る/忄 + つ/土 + 囗 = 憙
  - - き/木 + つ/土 + 囗 = 橲
  - - 火 + つ/土 + 囗 = 熹
  - - ね/示 + つ/土 + 囗 = 禧
  - - せ/食 + つ/土 + 囗 = 鱚
- - 氷/氵 + 囗 = 淳
- - や/疒 + 囗 = 癌
- - の/禾 + 囗 = 粘
- - い/糹/#2 + 囗 = 給
- - ⺼ + 囗 = 膈
- - 囗 + 囗 = 呟
- - 囗 + 宿 = 呪
- - 囗 + か/金 = 呵
- - 囗 + ぬ/力 = 喫
- - 囗 + ⺼ = 嘲
- - 囗 + し/巿 = 噂
- - 囗 + み/耳 = 囁
- - 囗 + ひ/辶 = 邑
  - - よ/广 + 囗 + ひ/辶 = 廱
    - - や/疒 + 囗 + ひ/辶 = 癰
  - - る/忄 + 囗 + ひ/辶 = 悒
  - - と/戸 + 囗 + ひ/辶 = 扈
    - - に/氵 + 囗 + ひ/辶 = 滬
- - 囗 + お/頁 = 頷
- - 囗 + せ/食 = 鳴
- - ⺼ + 囗 + け/犬 = 臙
- - れ/口 + 宿 + 囗 = 串
- - 囗 + ま/石 + し/巿 = 啻
- - 囗 + 宿 + ん/止 = 嗽
- - 囗 + ゐ/幺 + や/疒 = 嚮
- - 囗 + ん/止 + の/禾 = 齠

==== Other compounds ====
- - 囗 + ま/石 = 函
  - - 囗 + 囗 + ま/石 = 凾
  - - に/氵 + 囗 + ま/石 = 涵
- - 囗 + 比 = 麗
  - - な/亻 + 囗 + 比 = 儷
  - - に/氵 + 囗 + 比 = 灑
  - - そ/馬 + 囗 + 比 = 驪
- - ひ/辶 + 囗 + め/目 = 迩
- - む/車 + 宿 + 囗 = 輿
- - と/戸 + ぬ/力 + 囗 = 髫
