= Braille pattern dots-34 =

Braille pattern

6-dot braille cells
⠀	⠁	⠃	⠉	⠙	⠑	⠋	⠛	⠓	⠊	⠚	⠈	⠘
⠄	⠅	⠇	⠍	⠝	⠕	⠏	⠟	⠗	⠎	⠞	⠌	⠜
⠤	⠥	⠧	⠭	⠽	⠵	⠯	⠿	⠷	⠮	⠾	⠬	⠼
⠠	⠡	⠣	⠩	⠹	⠱	⠫	⠻	⠳	⠪	⠺	⠨	⠸
shift down	⠂	⠆	⠒	⠲	⠢	⠖	⠶	⠦	⠔	⠴	⠐	⠰

The Braille pattern dots-34 ( ⠌ ) is a 6-dot braille cell with the top right and bottom left dots raised, or an 8-dot braille cell with the top right and lower-middle dots raised. It is represented by the Unicode code point U+280c, and in Braille ASCII with the slash: /.

Character information
Preview	⠌ (braille pattern dots-34)	
Unicode name	BRAILLE PATTERN DOTS-34	
Encodings	decimal	hex
Unicode	10252	U+280C
UTF-8	226 160 140	E2 A0 8C
Numeric character reference	&#10252;	&#x280C;
Braille ASCII	47	2F

== Unified Braille ==
In unified international braille, the braille pattern dots-34 is used to represent a front, open to close diphthong, i.e. /ai/, or otherwise assigned as needed.

=== Table of unified braille values ===
French Braille	(Ì), /, ai
English Braille	"st" or / (forward slash)
English Contraction	still
German Braille	äu
Bharati Braille	ऐ / ਐ / ઐ / ঐ / ଐ / ఐ / ಐ / ഐ / ஐ / ඓ / ے
IPA Braille	/ɪ/
Slovak Braille	Í
Arabic Braille	أ
Irish Braille	st
Thai Braille	ฉ ch

== Other braille ==
Japanese Braille	ya / や / ヤ
Korean Braille	ye / ㅖ
Mainland Chinese Braille	zh
Taiwanese Braille	wu, -u / ㄨ
Two-Cell Chinese Braille	d- -èi
Nemeth Braille	/ (forward slash)
Gardner Salinas Braille	denominator sign

== Plus dots 7 and 8 ==
Related to Braille pattern dots-34 are Braille patterns 347, 348, and 3478, which are used in 8-dot braille systems, such as Gardner-Salinas and Luxembourgish Braille.

Character information
Preview	⡌ (braille pattern dots-347)		⢌ (braille pattern dots-348)		⣌ (braille pattern dots-3478)	
Unicode name	BRAILLE PATTERN DOTS-347		BRAILLE PATTERN DOTS-348		BRAILLE PATTERN DOTS-3478	
Encodings	decimal	hex	dec	hex	dec	hex
Unicode	10316	U+284C	10380	U+288C	10444	U+28CC
UTF-8	226 161 140	E2 A1 8C	226 162 140	E2 A2 8C	226 163 140	E2 A3 8C
Numeric character reference	&#10316;	&#x284C;	&#10380;	&#x288C;	&#10444;	&#x28CC;

	dots 347	dots 348	dots 3478
Gardner Salinas Braille	stroke / not modifier	@	/ (forward slash)

== Related 8-dot kantenji patterns ==
In the Japanese kantenji braille, the standard 8-dot Braille patterns 57, 157, 457, and 1457 are the patterns related to Braille pattern dots-34, since the two additional dots of kantenji patterns 034, 347, and 0347 are placed above the base 6-dot cell, instead of below, as in standard 8-dot braille.

Character information
Preview	⡐ (braille pattern dots-57)		⡑ (braille pattern dots-157)		⡘ (braille pattern dots-457)		⡙ (braille pattern dots-1457)	
Unicode name	BRAILLE PATTERN DOTS-57		BRAILLE PATTERN DOTS-157		BRAILLE PATTERN DOTS-457		BRAILLE PATTERN DOTS-1457	
Encodings	decimal	hex	dec	hex	dec	hex	dec	hex
Unicode	10320	U+2850	10321	U+2851	10328	U+2858	10329	U+2859
UTF-8	226 161 144	E2 A1 90	226 161 145	E2 A1 91	226 161 152	E2 A1 98	226 161 153	E2 A1 99
Numeric character reference	&#10320;	&#x2850;	&#10321;	&#x2851;	&#10328;	&#x2858;	&#10329;	&#x2859;

=== Kantenji using braille patterns 57, 157, 457, or 1457 ===
This listing includes kantenji using Braille pattern dots-34 for all 6349 kanji found in JIS C 6226-1978.

- - 病

==== Variants and thematic compounds ====
- - selector 3 + や/疒 = 艮
- - selector 4 + や/疒 = 乎
- - selector 5 + や/疒 = 豈
- - selector 6 + selector 6 + や/疒 = 鬯
- - や/疒 + selector 1 = 山
- - や/疒 + selector 2 = 矢
- - や/疒 + selector 5 = - 疾
- - 比 + や/疒 = 良

==== Compounds of 病 and 疒 ====
- - や/疒 + の/禾 = 疫
- - や/疒 + ひ/辶 = 疲
- - や/疒 + い/糹/#2 = 症
- - や/疒 + そ/馬 = 痒
  - - や/疒 + そ/馬 + や/疒 = 癢
- - や/疒 + し/巿 = 痔
- - や/疒 + と/戸 = 痘
- - や/疒 + つ/土 = 痛
- - や/疒 + ぬ/力 = 痢
- - や/疒 + え/訁 = 痩
- - や/疒 + 数 = 瘍
- - や/疒 + ろ/十 = 療
- - や/疒 + 囗 = 癌
- - や/疒 + ゆ/彳 = 癒
  - - や/疒 + や/疒 + ゆ/彳 = 瘉
- - や/疒 + ま/石 = 癖
- - や/疒 + 数 + て/扌 = 疔
- - や/疒 + す/発 + selector 4 = 疚
- - や/疒 + 宿 + 仁/亻 = 疣
- - や/疒 + 仁/亻 + 宿 = 疥
- - や/疒 + も/門 + selector 2 = 疱
- - や/疒 + selector 4 + る/忄 = 疳
- - や/疒 + 比 + selector 4 = 疵
- - や/疒 + selector 4 + 日 = 疸
- - や/疒 + 宿 + う/宀/#3 = 疹
- - や/疒 + す/発 + selector 1 = 疼
- - や/疒 + 宿 + そ/馬 = 疽
- - や/疒 + ぬ/力 + れ/口 = 痂
- - や/疒 + 龸 + ゐ/幺 = 痃
- - や/疒 + り/分 + へ/⺩ = 痊
- - や/疒 + ゆ/彳 + な/亻 = 痍
- - や/疒 + 宿 + け/犬 = 痙
- - や/疒 + ふ/女 + 囗 = 痞
- - や/疒 + つ/土 + 心 = 痣
- - や/疒 + 火 + 火 = 痰
- - や/疒 + 心 + ま/石 = 痲
- - や/疒 + き/木 + き/木 = 痳
- - や/疒 + た/⽥ + さ/阝 = 痺
- - や/疒 + 囗 + ろ/十 = 痼
- - や/疒 + さ/阝 + か/金 = 痾
- - や/疒 + 宿 + ふ/女 = 痿
- - や/疒 + お/頁 + ろ/十 = 瘁
- - や/疒 + む/車 + 宿 = 瘋
- - や/疒 + 宿 + ⺼ = 瘟
- - や/疒 + ⺼ + 仁/亻 = 瘠
- - や/疒 + り/分 + お/頁 = 瘡
- - や/疒 + ふ/女 + の/禾 = 瘢
- - や/疒 + ら/月 + た/⽥ = 瘤
- - や/疒 + す/発 + か/金 = 瘧
- - や/疒 + た/⽥ + ゐ/幺 = 瘰
- - や/疒 + ま/石 + ろ/十 = 瘴
- - や/疒 + 宿 + る/忄 = 瘻
- - や/疒 + 龸 + ぬ/力 = 癆
- - や/疒 + も/門 + ら/月 = 癇
- - や/疒 + 宿 + す/発 = 癈
- - や/疒 + 数 + ま/石 = 癘
- - や/疒 + こ/子 + の/禾 = 癜
- - や/疒 + 宿 + よ/广 = 癡
- - や/疒 + こ/子 + ん/止 = 癧
- - や/疒 + ち/竹 + selector 1 = 癨
- - や/疒 + お/頁 + 数 = 癩
- - や/疒 + の/禾 + を/貝 = 癪
- - や/疒 + せ/食 + そ/馬 = 癬
- - や/疒 + 囗 + ひ/辶 = 癰
- - や/疒 + selector 1 + め/目 = 癲

==== Compounds of 艮 ====
- - る/忄 + や/疒 = 恨
- - き/木 + や/疒 = 根
  - - き/木 + や/疒 + れ/口 = 椥
- - 龸 + や/疒 = 爵
  - - れ/口 + 龸 + や/疒 = 嚼
- - め/目 + や/疒 = 眼
- - ひ/辶 + や/疒 = 退
  - - ⺼ + ひ/辶 + や/疒 = 腿
  - - ね/示 + ひ/辶 + や/疒 = 褪
- - ゐ/幺 + や/疒 = 郷
  - - 囗 + ゐ/幺 + や/疒 = 嚮
- - か/金 + や/疒 = 銀
- - さ/阝 + や/疒 = 限
- - や/疒 + ち/竹 = 墾
- - や/疒 + 心 = 懇
- - や/疒 + 仁/亻 = 既
  - - よ/广 + や/疒 + 仁/亻 = 廐
  - - 日 + や/疒 + 仁/亻 = 曁
- - け/犬 + selector 3 + や/疒 = 狠
- - み/耳 + selector 3 + や/疒 = 跟
- - つ/土 + 宿 + や/疒 = 垠
- - ゆ/彳 + 宿 + や/疒 = 很
- - や/疒 + 宿 + や/疒 = 痕
- - く/艹 + 宿 + や/疒 = 艱
- - や/疒 + ん/止 + の/禾 = 齦

==== Compounds of 乎 ====
- - れ/口 + や/疒 = 呼

==== Compounds of 豈 ====
- - や/疒 + 龸 = 凱
- - 心 + selector 5 + や/疒 = 榿
- - ま/石 + selector 5 + や/疒 = 磑
- - ぬ/力 + 宿 + や/疒 = 剴
- - や/疒 + 日 + selector 1 = 皚
- - や/疒 + め/目 + 宿 = 覬
- - か/金 + 宿 + や/疒 = 鎧

==== Compounds of 山 ====
- - う/宀/#3 + や/疒 = 密
  - - 心 + う/宀/#3 + や/疒 = 樒
- - ま/石 + や/疒 = 岩
- - く/艹 + や/疒 = 岳
- - せ/食 + や/疒 = 島
  - - て/扌 + せ/食 + や/疒 = 搗
  - - き/木 + せ/食 + や/疒 = 槝
- - ゆ/彳 + や/疒 = 徴
- - い/糹/#2 + や/疒 = 繃
- - は/辶 + や/疒 = 辿
- - や/疒 + は/辶 = 岐
- - や/疒 + こ/子 = 岬
- - や/疒 + か/金 = 岸
- - や/疒 + う/宀/#3 = 峠
- - や/疒 + な/亻 = 峡
  - - や/疒 + や/疒 + な/亻 = 峽
- - や/疒 + ほ/方 = 峰
- - や/疒 + ね/示 = 崇
- - や/疒 + け/犬 = 崎
- - や/疒 + ら/月 = 崩
- - や/疒 + ん/止 = 嵌
- - や/疒 + む/車 = 嵐
- - や/疒 + り/分 = 嶮
- - や/疒 + お/頁 = 嶺
- - や/疒 + ゑ/訁 = 嶽
- - や/疒 + 氷/氵 = 巌
  - - や/疒 + や/疒 + 氷/氵 = 巖
- - や/疒 + 火 = 炭
- - 仁/亻 + や/疒 + selector 1 = 仙
- - つ/土 + や/疒 + selector 1 = 圸
- - て/扌 + や/疒 + selector 1 = 攜
- - き/木 + や/疒 + selector 1 = 杣
- - に/氵 + や/疒 + selector 1 = 汕
- - や/疒 + や/疒 + selector 1 = 疝
- - も/門 + や/疒 + selector 1 = 閊
- - や/疒 + selector 1 + ん/止 = 岻
- - や/疒 + 数 + を/貝 = 乢
- - や/疒 + う/宀/#3 + ふ/女 = 妛
- - や/疒 + selector 4 + ぬ/力 = 屶
- - や/疒 + 龸 + お/頁 = 屹
- - や/疒 + selector 4 + ゐ/幺 = 岌
- - や/疒 + り/分 + selector 1 = 岑
- - や/疒 + う/宀/#3 + り/分 = 岔
- - や/疒 + selector 5 + そ/馬 = 岨
- - や/疒 + た/⽥ + selector 4 = 岫
- - や/疒 + 仁/亻 + 囗 = 岱
- - や/疒 + う/宀/#3 + 日 = 岶
- - や/疒 + み/耳 + ん/止 = 岷
- - や/疒 + り/分 + か/金 = 岼
- - や/疒 + れ/口 + と/戸 = 岾
- - や/疒 + む/車 + と/戸 = 峅
- - や/疒 + り/分 + 囗 = 峇
- - や/疒 + つ/土 + し/巿 = 峙
- - や/疒 + 囗 + selector 1 = 峨
- - や/疒 + 宿 + 囗 = 峩
- - や/疒 + た/⽥ + selector 1 = 峪
- - や/疒 + そ/馬 + ⺼ = 峭
- - や/疒 + 宿 + ほ/方 = 峯
- - や/疒 + 日 + な/亻 = 峺
- - や/疒 + う/宀/#3 + む/車 = 峻
- - や/疒 + う/宀/#3 + か/金 = 崋
- - や/疒 + う/宀/#3 + 比 = 崑
- - や/疒 + う/宀/#3 + い/糹/#2 = 崔
- - や/疒 + 龸 + つ/土 = 崕
- - や/疒 + う/宀/#3 + つ/土 = 崖
- - や/疒 + 囗 + ゆ/彳 = 崗
- - や/疒 + 龸 + る/忄 = 崘
- - や/疒 + う/宀/#3 + る/忄 = 崙
- - や/疒 + う/宀/#3 + す/発 = 崚
- - や/疒 + と/戸 + へ/⺩ = 崛
- - や/疒 + 宿 + か/金 = 崟
- - や/疒 + そ/馬 + 宿 = 崢
- - や/疒 + め/目 + せ/食 = 嵋
- - や/疒 + う/宀/#3 + く/艹 = 嵎
- - や/疒 + れ/口 + う/宀/#3 = 嵒
- - や/疒 + う/宀/#3 + け/犬 = 嵜
- - や/疒 + 比 + え/訁 = 嵩
- - や/疒 + お/頁 + に/氵 = 嵬
- - や/疒 + そ/馬 + こ/子 = 嵯
- - や/疒 + う/宀/#3 + そ/馬 = 嵳
- - や/疒 + ゆ/彳 + ゆ/彳 = 嵶
- - や/疒 + う/宀/#3 + ま/石 = 嶂
- - や/疒 + む/車 + を/貝 = 嶄
- - や/疒 + も/門 + selector 3 = 嶇
- - や/疒 + せ/食 + selector 1 = 嶋
- - や/疒 + う/宀/#3 + せ/食 = 嶌
- - や/疒 + さ/阝 + せ/食 = 嶐
- - や/疒 + す/発 + と/戸 = 嶝
- - や/疒 + 宿 + つ/土 = 嶢
- - や/疒 + そ/馬 + 囗 = 嶬
- - や/疒 + 宿 + selector 4 = 嶼
- - や/疒 + ぬ/力 + 宿 = 巉
- - や/疒 + う/宀/#3 + お/頁 = 巍
- - や/疒 + う/宀/#3 + え/訁 = 巒
- - や/疒 + お/頁 + て/扌 = 巓
- - に/氵 + 宿 + や/疒 = 澂
- - む/車 + 宿 + や/疒 = 蚩

==== Compounds of 矢 ====
- - や/疒 + れ/口 = 知
  - - や/疒 + や/疒 = 痴
  - - や/疒 + 日 = 智
  - - み/耳 + や/疒 + れ/口 = 聟
  - - む/車 + や/疒 + れ/口 = 蜘
- - 仁/亻 + や/疒 = 侯
  - - け/犬 + 仁/亻 + や/疒 = 猴
  - - ち/竹 + 仁/亻 + や/疒 = 篌
- - な/亻 + や/疒 = 候
- - も/門 + や/疒 = 医
  - - も/門 + も/門 + や/疒 = 醫
- - む/車 + や/疒 = 挨
- - ほ/方 + や/疒 = 族
  - - れ/口 + ほ/方 + や/疒 = 嗾
  - - ち/竹 + ほ/方 + や/疒 = 簇
  - - く/艹 + ほ/方 + や/疒 = 蔟
  - - か/金 + ほ/方 + や/疒 = 鏃
- - と/戸 + や/疒 = 短
- - や/疒 + よ/广 = 疑
  - - 氷/氵 + や/疒 = 凝
  - - て/扌 + や/疒 = 擬
  - - や/疒 + や/疒 + よ/广 = 嶷
  - - ま/石 + や/疒 + よ/广 = 礙
- - や/疒 + す/発 = 矩
- - ち/竹 + や/疒 + selector 2 = 笶
- - く/艹 + や/疒 + selector 2 = 薙
- - や/疒 + ゆ/彳 + selector 4 = 矧
- - や/疒 + の/禾 + ふ/女 = 矮
- - や/疒 + 宿 + の/禾 = 矯
- - や/疒 + selector 3 + ふ/女 = 肄
- - み/耳 + 宿 + や/疒 = 踟
- - や/疒 + 宿 + せ/食 = 雉

==== Compounds of 疾 ====
- - ふ/女 + や/疒 + selector 5 = 嫉

==== Compounds of 良 ====
- - ふ/女 + や/疒 = 娘
- - や/疒 + さ/阝 = 郎
  - - よ/广 + や/疒 = 廊
  - - 心 + や/疒 + さ/阝 = 榔
  - - へ/⺩ + や/疒 + さ/阝 = 瑯
  - - む/車 + や/疒 + さ/阝 = 螂
- - ら/月 + や/疒 = 朗
- - に/氵 + や/疒 = 浪
- - け/犬 + や/疒 = 狼
- - そ/馬 + や/疒 = 養
  - - に/氵 + そ/馬 + や/疒 = 瀁
  - - せ/食 + そ/馬 + や/疒 = 鱶
- - ら/月 + 比 + や/疒 = 朖
- - へ/⺩ + 比 + や/疒 = 琅
- - の/禾 + 比 + や/疒 = 粮
- - 心 + 比 + や/疒 = 莨
- - み/耳 + 比 + や/疒 = 踉

==== Other compounds ====
- - ち/竹 + や/疒 = 爺
- - 日 + や/疒 = 曜
- - み/耳 + や/疒 = 躍
- - や/疒 + に/氵 = 濯
- - や/疒 + selector 4 + 囗 = 戳
- - て/扌 + 宿 + や/疒 = 擢
- - き/木 + 宿 + や/疒 = 櫂
- - 火 + 宿 + や/疒 = 燿
- - 龸 + 宿 + や/疒 = 耀
- - き/木 + 龸 + や/疒 = 梍
