= Braille pattern dots-36 =

Braille pattern

6-dot braille cells
⠀	⠁	⠃	⠉	⠙	⠑	⠋	⠛	⠓	⠊	⠚	⠈	⠘
⠄	⠅	⠇	⠍	⠝	⠕	⠏	⠟	⠗	⠎	⠞	⠌	⠜
⠤	⠥	⠧	⠭	⠽	⠵	⠯	⠿	⠷	⠮	⠾	⠬	⠼
⠠	⠡	⠣	⠩	⠹	⠱	⠫	⠻	⠳	⠪	⠺	⠨	⠸
shift down	⠂	⠆	⠒	⠲	⠢	⠖	⠶	⠦	⠔	⠴	⠐	⠰

The Braille pattern dots-36 ( ⠤ ) is a 6-dot braille cell with both bottom dots raised, or an 8-dot braille cell with both lower-middle dots raised. It is represented by the Unicode code point U+2824, and in Braille ASCII with the hyphen: -.

Character information
Preview	⠤ (braille pattern dots-36)	
Unicode name	BRAILLE PATTERN DOTS-36	
Encodings	decimal	hex
Unicode	10276	U+2824
UTF-8	226 160 164	E2 A0 A4
Numeric character reference	&#10276;	&#x2824;
Braille ASCII	45	2D

== Unified Braille ==
In unified international braille, the braille pattern dots-36 is used to represent hyphens and dashes, and otherwise as needed.

=== Table of unified braille values ===
French Braille	(hyphen), (math) − (minus), com-, "celui"
English Braille	(hyphen)
English Contraction	com-†
German Braille	(hyphen)
Bharati Braille	(hyphen)
IPA Braille	(hyphen - morpheme break)
Russian Braille	(hyphen)
Slovak Braille	(hyphen), – (en dash)
Arabic Braille	(hyphen)
Irish Braille	com
Thai Braille	consonant modifier

† Abolished in Unified English Braille

== Other braille ==
Japanese Braille	「 and 」
Taiwanese Braille	。 (period), ・ (interpunct)
Two-Cell Chinese Braille	〜 (hyphen)
Nemeth Braille	(minus sign)

== Plus dots 7 and 8 ==
Related to Braille pattern dots-36 are Braille patterns 367, 368, and 3678, which are used in 8-dot braille systems, such as Gardner-Salinas and Luxembourgish Braille.

Character information
Preview	⡤ (braille pattern dots-367)		⢤ (braille pattern dots-368)		⣤ (braille pattern dots-3678)	
Unicode name	BRAILLE PATTERN DOTS-367		BRAILLE PATTERN DOTS-368		BRAILLE PATTERN DOTS-3678	
Encodings	decimal	hex	dec	hex	dec	hex
Unicode	10340	U+2864	10404	U+28A4	10468	U+28E4
UTF-8	226 161 164	E2 A1 A4	226 162 164	E2 A2 A4	226 163 164	E2 A3 A4
Numeric character reference	&#10340;	&#x2864;	&#10404;	&#x28A4;	&#10468;	&#x28E4;

	dots 367	dots 368	dots 3678
Gardner Salinas Braille	markup indicator	… (ellipses)	∝ (proportionality)

== Related 8-dot kantenji patterns ==
In the Japanese kantenji braille, the standard 8-dot Braille patterns 78, 178, 478, and 1478 are the patterns related to Braille pattern dots-36, since the two additional dots of kantenji patterns 036, 367, and 0367 are placed above the base 6-dot cell, instead of below, as in standard 8-dot braille.

Character information
Preview	⣀ (braille pattern dots-78)		⣁ (braille pattern dots-178)		⣈ (braille pattern dots-478)		⣉ (braille pattern dots-1478)	
Unicode name	BRAILLE PATTERN DOTS-78		BRAILLE PATTERN DOTS-178		BRAILLE PATTERN DOTS-478		BRAILLE PATTERN DOTS-1478	
Encodings	decimal	hex	dec	hex	dec	hex	dec	hex
Unicode	10432	U+28C0	10433	U+28C1	10440	U+28C8	10441	U+28C9
UTF-8	226 163 128	E2 A3 80	226 163 129	E2 A3 81	226 163 136	E2 A3 88	226 163 137	E2 A3 89
Numeric character reference	&#10432;	&#x28C0;	&#10433;	&#x28C1;	&#10440;	&#x28C8;	&#10441;	&#x28C9;

=== Kantenji using braille patterns 78, 178, 478, or 1478 ===
This listing includes kantenji using Braille pattern dots-36 for all 6349 kanji found in JIS C 6226-1978.

- - 学

==== Variants and thematic compounds ====
- - selector 1 + 龸 = 亠
- - selector 4 + 龸 = 凡
- - selector 5 + 龸 = 舜
- - selector 6 + 龸 = 几
- - 龸 + selector 1 = 愛
- - 龸 + selector 2 = 光
- - 龸 + selector 3 = 文
- - 比 + 龸 = 下
  - - selector 1 + 比 + 龸 = 卞

==== Compounds of 学 and 龸 ====
- - 龸 + 龸 + こ/子 = 學
- - ふ/女 + 龸 = 妥
  - - い/糹/#2 + ふ/女 + 龸 = 綏
  - - せ/食 + ふ/女 + 龸 = 餒
- - 龸 + ゑ/訁 = 受
  - - て/扌 + 龸 = 授
  - - ゐ/幺 + 龸 + ゑ/訁 = 綬
- - け/犬 + 龸 = 獣
  - - け/犬 + け/犬 + 龸 = 獸
- - 龸 + 宿 = 党
  - - 龸 + 龸 + 宿 = 黨
    - - な/亻 + 龸 + 宿 = 儻
- - 龸 + ぬ/力 = 労
  - - 龸 + 龸 + ぬ/力 = 勞
    - - て/扌 + 龸 + ぬ/力 = 撈
    - - や/疒 + 龸 + ぬ/力 = 癆
- - 龸 + み/耳 = 営
  - - 龸 + 龸 + み/耳 = 營
- - 龸 + つ/土 = 堂
  - - め/目 + 龸 + つ/土 = 瞠
  - - む/車 + 龸 + つ/土 = 螳
- - 龸 + し/巿 = 常
  - - ふ/女 + 龸 + し/巿 = 嫦
  - - む/車 + 龸 + し/巿 = 蟐
- - 龸 + ふ/女 = 当
  - - 龸 + 龸 + ふ/女 = 當
    - - ね/示 + 龸 + ふ/女 = 襠
    - - む/車 + 龸 + ふ/女 = 蟷
    - - ま/石 + 龸 + ふ/女 = 礑
  - - き/木 + 龸 + ふ/女 = 档
- - 龸 + て/扌 = 掌
- - 龸 + き/木 = 栄
  - - 龸 + 龸 + き/木 = 榮
    - - む/車 + 龸 + き/木 = 蠑
- - 龸 + や/疒 = 爵
  - - れ/口 + 龸 + や/疒 = 嚼
- - 龸 + め/目 = 覚
  - - て/扌 + 龸 + め/目 = 撹
  - - 龸 + 龸 + め/目 = 覺
- - 龸 + え/訁 = 誉
  - - 龸 + 龸 + え/訁 = 譽
- - 龸 + を/貝 = 賞
- - ゆ/彳 + 龸 + か/金 = 徭
- - る/忄 + 龸 + け/犬 = 懽
- - 氷/氵 + 龸 + け/犬 = 灌
- - え/訁 + 龸 + け/犬 = 讙
- - か/金 + 龸 + け/犬 = 鑵
- - ほ/方 + 龸 + う/宀/#3 = 殍
- - 火 + 龸 + ろ/十 = 煢
- - く/艹 + 龸 + け/犬 = 蕚
- - け/犬 + 龸 + せ/食 = 鶚
- - 龸 + 宿 + に/氵 = 嘗
- - 龸 + selector 4 + る/忄 = 甞
- - の/禾 + の/禾 + 龸 = 稱
- - 龸 + め/目 + 宿 = 覓
- - 龸 + せ/食 + selector 1 = 鷽
- - 龸 + し/巿 + こ/子 = 黌

==== Compounds of 亠 ====
- - れ/口 + 龸 = 囃
- - 龸 + ち/竹 = 交
  - - な/亻 + 龸 + ち/竹 = 佼
  - - れ/口 + 龸 + ち/竹 = 咬
  - - け/犬 + 龸 + ち/竹 = 狡
  - - 日 + 龸 + ち/竹 = 皎
  - - い/糹/#2 + 龸 + ち/竹 = 纐
  - - む/車 + 龸 + ち/竹 = 蛟
  - - そ/馬 + 龸 + ち/竹 = 駮
  - - せ/食 + 龸 + ち/竹 = 鮫
- - 龸 + ま/石 = 亨
  - - 火 + 龸 + ま/石 = 烹
- - 龸 + こ/子 = 享
  - - る/忄 + 龸 + こ/子 = 惇
  - - き/木 + 龸 + こ/子 = 椁
  - - え/訁 + 龸 + こ/子 = 諄
  - - せ/食 + 龸 + こ/子 = 醇
- - 龸 + れ/口 = 京
  - - ぬ/力 + 龸 + れ/口 = 勍
  - - て/扌 + 龸 + れ/口 = 掠
  - - 心 + 龸 + れ/口 = 椋
  - - か/金 + 龸 + れ/口 = 鍄
  - - し/巿 + 龸 + れ/口 = 黥
- - 龸 + ね/示 = 哀
- - 龸 + 囗 = 壇
  - - 心 + 龸 + 囗 = 檀
  - - そ/馬 + 龸 + 囗 = 羶
- - 龸 + な/亻 = 夜
  - - て/扌 + 龸 + な/亻 = 掖
  - - ⺼ + 龸 + な/亻 = 腋
- - 龸 + せ/食 = 毫
- - 龸 + そ/馬 = 豪
  - - つ/土 + 龸 + そ/馬 = 壕
  - - に/氵 + 龸 + そ/馬 = 濠
- - 龸 + ゐ/幺 = 玄
  - - ゆ/彳 + 龸 = 弦
  - - 龸 + た/⽥ = 畜
  - - 龸 + ろ/十 = 率
    - - む/車 + 龸 + ろ/十 = 蟀
  - - や/疒 + 龸 + ゐ/幺 = 痃
  - - め/目 + 龸 + ゐ/幺 = 眩
  - - い/糹/#2 + 龸 + ゐ/幺 = 絃
  - - ふ/女 + 龸 + ゐ/幺 = 舷
  - - ゆ/彳 + 龸 + ゐ/幺 = 衒
  - - か/金 + 龸 + ゐ/幺 = 鉉
  - - せ/食 + 龸 + ゐ/幺 = 鯀
- - 龸 + よ/广 = 棄
  - - 龸 + 龸 + よ/广 = 弃
- - 龸 + ら/月 = 育
- - selector 1 + 龸 + れ/口 = 亰
- - 龸 + 日 = 冥
  - - し/巿 + 龸 + 日 = 幎
  - - 日 + 龸 + 日 = 暝
  - - 心 + 龸 + 日 = 榠
  - - に/氵 + 龸 + 日 = 溟
  - - め/目 + 龸 + 日 = 瞑
  - - む/車 + 龸 + 日 = 螟
- - 日 + 龸 + ろ/十 = 暸
- - に/氵 + 龸 + ろ/十 = 潦
- - き/木 + 龸 + ま/石 = 柆
- - ま/石 + 龸 + 氷/氵 = 竭
- - き/木 + 龸 + け/犬 = 桍
- - も/門 + 龸 + し/巿 = 閙
- - 龸 + う/宀/#3 + な/亻 = 亳
- - 龸 + selector 4 + く/艹 = 毓
- - に/氵 + 宿 + 龸 = 滾
- - 龸 + ね/示 + selector 1 = 褻
- - 龸 + な/亻 + れ/口 = 襃
- - せ/食 + 氷/氵 + 龸 = 酖
- - 龸 + 宿 + せ/食 = 鶉

==== Compounds of 凡 ====
- - し/巿 + 龸 = 帆
- - ち/竹 + 龸 = 築
- - 龸 + 心 = 恐
- - き/木 + selector 4 + 龸 = 梵
- - に/氵 + selector 4 + 龸 = 汎
- - む/車 + 龸 + 龸 = 蛩
- - む/車 + 龸 + 龸 = 蛩
- - み/耳 + 宿 + 龸 = 跫
- - 龸 + と/戸 + ろ/十 = 鞏

==== Compounds of 舜 ====
- - め/目 + 龸 = 瞬
- - 心 + selector 5 + 龸 = 蕣

==== Compounds of 几 ====
- - 龸 + 龸 = 充
  - - い/糹/#2 + 龸 = 統
  - - か/金 + 龸 = 銃
- - つ/土 + 龸 = 先
  - - に/氵 + 龸 = 洗
  - - ち/竹 + つ/土 + 龸 = 筅
  - - み/耳 + つ/土 + 龸 = 跣
- - 宿 + 龸 = 冗
  - - る/忄 + 宿 + 龸 = 忱
  - - め/目 + 宿 + 龸 = 眈
- - す/発 + 龸 = 処
  - - す/発 + す/発 + 龸 = 處
- - や/疒 + 龸 = 凱
- - も/門 + 龸 = 匹
- - き/木 + 龸 = 机
- - み/耳 + 龸 = 耽
- - 氷/氵 + 龸 = 沈
- - 龸 + 仁/亻 = 就
- - ⺼ + 龸 = 肌
- - お/頁 + 龸 = 頽
- - せ/食 + 龸 = 飢
- - れ/口 + selector 6 + 龸 = 咒
- - 仁/亻 + 龸 + 龸 = 凭
- - く/艹 + 龸 + の/禾 = 芟
- - む/車 + 龸 + の/禾 = 轂
- - む/車 + 宿 + 龸 = 允
- - 仁/亻 + 龸 + 龸 = 凭
- - て/扌 + 宿 + 龸 = 撓
- - き/木 + 宿 + 龸 = 橈
- - の/禾 + 宿 + 龸 = 禿
- - 龸 + う/宀/#3 + せ/食 = 鳧

==== Compounds of 愛 ====
- - 日 + 龸 + selector 1 = 曖
- - め/目 + 龸 + selector 1 = 瞹
- - ち/竹 + 龸 + selector 1 = 靉

==== Compounds of 光 ====
- - 龸 + む/車 = 輝
- - る/忄 + 龸 + selector 2 = 恍
- - 日 + 龸 + selector 2 = 晃
  - - 氷/氵 + 龸 + selector 2 = 滉
- - に/氵 + 龸 + selector 2 = 洸
- - い/糹/#2 + 龸 + selector 2 = 絖
- - ⺼ + 龸 + selector 2 = 胱
- - 日 + 宿 + 龸 = 晄
- - 龸 + 宿 + や/疒 = 耀

==== Compounds of 文 ====
- - さ/阝 + 龸 = 斉
  - - い/糹/#2 + さ/阝 + 龸 = 緕
  - - さ/阝 + さ/阝 + 龸 = 齊
    - - さ/阝 + 龸 + 火 = 韲
    - - な/亻 + さ/阝 + 龸 = 儕
    - - て/扌 + さ/阝 + 龸 = 擠
    - - 心 + さ/阝 + 龸 = 薺
    - - み/耳 + さ/阝 + 龸 = 躋
    - - ち/竹 + さ/阝 + 龸 = 霽
- - 火 + 龸 = 斐
- - へ/⺩ + 龸 = 斑
- - ゐ/幺 + 龸 = 紋
- - む/車 + 龸 = 蚊
- - 龸 + さ/阝 = 斎
  - - 龸 + 龸 + さ/阝 = 齋
    - - を/貝 + 龸 + さ/阝 = 齎
- - れ/口 + 龸 + selector 3 = 吝
  - - る/忄 + 龸 = 悋
- - こ/子 + 龸 + selector 3 = 斈
- - 日 + 龸 + selector 3 = 旻
- - い/糹/#2 + 龸 + selector 3 = 紊
- - す/発 + 龸 + selector 3 = 虔
- - も/門 + 龸 + selector 3 = 閔
- - そ/馬 + 龸 + selector 3 = 馼

==== Compounds of 下 and 卞 ====
- - つ/土 + 比 + 龸 = 圷
- - き/木 + 比 + 龸 = 梺
- - も/門 + 比 + 龸 = 閇
- - ち/竹 + 比 + 龸 = 雫
- - て/扌 + 比 + 龸 = 抃
- - ね/示 + う/宀/#3 + 龸 = 裃
- - と/戸 + う/宀/#3 + 龸 = 鞐
- - 龸 + む/車 + 宿 = 颪

==== Other compounds ====
- - ほ/方 + 龸 = 於
  - - れ/口 + ほ/方 + 龸 = 唹
  - - に/氵 + ほ/方 + 龸 = 淤
  - - も/門 + ほ/方 + 龸 = 閼
  - - せ/食 + ほ/方 + 龸 = 鯲
- - 囗 + 龸 = 図
  - - 囗 + 囗 + 龸 = 圖
- - 日 + 龸 = 晶
  - - き/木 + 日 + 龸 = 橸
- - ね/示 + 龸 = 祢
  - - ね/示 + ね/示 + 龸 = 袮
- - の/禾 + 龸 = 称
- - 心 + 龸 = 蕨
- - ひ/辶 + 龸 = 迄
- - と/戸 + 龸 = 鬢
- - 龸 + お/頁 = 乞
- - 龸 + ほ/方 = 夢
  - - な/亻 + 龸 + ほ/方 = 儚
- - 龸 + ひ/辶 = 戉
  - - か/金 + 龸 + ひ/辶 = 鉞
- - 龸 + は/辶 = 毎
  - - 龸 + 氷/氵 = 敏
  - - 心 + 龸 + は/辶 = 莓
- - 龸 + 火 = 為
  - - 龸 + 龸 + 火 = 爲
    - - え/訁 + 龸 + 火 = 譌
- - 龸 + り/分 = 重
  - - ⺼ + 龸 + り/分 = 腫
  - - く/艹 + 龸 + り/分 = 董
  - - み/耳 + 龸 + り/分 = 踵
  - - か/金 + 龸 + り/分 = 鍾
- - 龸 + い/糹/#2 = 雑
  - - 龸 + 龸 + い/糹/#2 = 雜
- - な/亻 + 龸 + け/犬 = 倏
- - れ/口 + 龸 + お/頁 = 吃
- - え/訁 + 龸 + お/頁 = 訖
- - な/亻 + 龸 + も/門 = 偃
- - れ/口 + 龸 + そ/馬 = 喙
- - と/戸 + 龸 + の/禾 = 彝
- - 囗 + 龸 + ほ/方 = 圀
- - つ/土 + 龸 + と/戸 = 垪
- - つ/土 + 龸 + selector 1 = 壺
- - ふ/女 + 龸 + ゑ/訁 = 娵
- - こ/子 + 龸 + 氷/氵 = 孜
- - や/疒 + 龸 + お/頁 = 屹
- - や/疒 + 龸 + つ/土 = 崕
- - や/疒 + 龸 + る/忄 = 崘
- - よ/广 + 龸 + き/木 = 廝
- - る/忄 + 龸 + む/車 = 慚
- - お/頁 + 龸 + 囗 = 戞
- - て/扌 + 龸 + む/車 = 搆
- - て/扌 + 龸 + う/宀/#3 = 搴
- - 日 + 龸 + む/車 = 暉
- - き/木 + 龸 + 囗 = 杙
- - 心 + 龸 + 数 = 杤
- - き/木 + 龸 + 日 = 杳
- - 心 + 龸 + ひ/辶 = 杷
- - 心 + 龸 + 比 = 枇
- - 心 + 龸 + り/分 = 枌
- - き/木 + 龸 + と/戸 = 枦
- - き/木 + 龸 + ぬ/力 = 枴
- - き/木 + 龸 + を/貝 = 柝
- - 心 + 龸 + む/車 = 栩
- - き/木 + 龸 + や/疒 = 梍
- - き/木 + 龸 + き/木 = 棊
- - 心 + 龸 + ゆ/彳 = 棣
- - 心 + 龸 + も/門 = 椚
- - き/木 + 龸 + そ/馬 = 椽
- - き/木 + 龸 + む/車 = 樛
- - き/木 + 龸 + 龸 = 橇
- - 心 + 龸 + ま/石 = 檗
- - き/木 + 龸 + へ/⺩ = 檮
- - 心 + 龸 + た/⽥ = 櫨
- - に/氵 + 龸 + ん/止 = 沚
- - に/氵 + 龸 + む/車 = 浚
- - に/氵 + 龸 + つ/土 = 涌
- - に/氵 + 龸 + ら/月 = 涓
- - に/氵 + 龸 + ぬ/力 = 渕
- - に/氵 + 龸 + ⺼ = 渙
- - に/氵 + 龸 + ゆ/彳 = 渝
- - 氷/氵 + 龸 + そ/馬 = 漾
- - に/氵 + 龸 + め/目 = 濬
- - に/氵 + 龸 + か/金 = 瀏
- - に/氵 + 龸 + た/⽥ = 瀘
- - め/目 + 龸 + ち/竹 = 爻
- - そ/馬 + 龸 + そ/馬 = 犧
- - ゆ/彳 + 龸 + た/⽥ = 疆
- - ま/石 + 龸 + そ/馬 = 碼
- - ま/石 + 龸 + つ/土 = 磽
- - ま/石 + 龸 + ま/石 = 礪
- - ね/示 + 龸 + さ/阝 = 祁
- - ね/示 + 龸 + た/⽥ = 禝
- - ち/竹 + 龸 + そ/馬 = 筝
- - ち/竹 + 龸 + へ/⺩ = 筺
- - ち/竹 + 龸 + 囗 = 箘
- - ち/竹 + 龸 + 比 = 篦
- - ち/竹 + 龸 + ね/示 = 簔
- - ち/竹 + 龸 + 日 = 簷
- - ち/竹 + 龸 + ら/月 = 籀
- - ち/竹 + 龸 + み/耳 = 籖
- - の/禾 + 龸 + と/戸 = 粐
- - い/糹/#2 + 龸 + 囗 = 綫
- - い/糹/#2 + 龸 + み/耳 = 纎
- - そ/馬 + 龸 + 火 = 羹
- - み/耳 + 龸 + ゐ/幺 = 聨
- - 心 + 龸 + め/目 = 苜
- - 心 + 龸 + き/木 = 菫
- - 心 + 龸 + と/戸 = 萄
- - 心 + 龸 + ほ/方 = 葡
- - そ/馬 + 龸 + ら/月 = 葢
- - 心 + 龸 + の/禾 = 葭
- - 心 + 龸 + す/発 = 蔆
- - 心 + 龸 + 火 = 薤
- - く/艹 + 龸 + 数 = 藪
- - 心 + 龸 + そ/馬 = 蘓
- - く/艹 + 龸 + ま/石 = 蘰
- - む/車 + 龸 + 宿 = 蛻
- - む/車 + 龸 + へ/⺩ = 蝗
- - む/車 + 龸 + 囗 = 蠏
- - む/車 + 龸 + く/艹 = 蠖
- - む/車 + 龸 + ま/石 = 蠹
- - え/訁 + 龸 + ま/石 = 謾
- - え/訁 + 龸 + 日 = 譖
- - え/訁 + 龸 + つ/土 = 讌
- - そ/馬 + 龸 + 比 = 貔
- - み/耳 + 龸 + ん/止 = 趾
- - み/耳 + 龸 + も/門 = 躪
- - み/耳 + 龸 + よ/广 = 軅
- - む/車 + 龸 + う/宀/#3 = 軫
- - む/車 + 龸 + と/戸 = 辯
- - ひ/辶 + 龸 + む/車 = 逵
- - せ/食 + 龸 + の/禾 = 酥
- - せ/食 + 龸 + た/⽥ = 醴
- - か/金 + 龸 + ぬ/力 = 釛
- - か/金 + 龸 + た/⽥ = 鈿
- - か/金 + 龸 + ま/石 = 鉐
- - か/金 + 龸 + ゆ/彳 = 銜
- - か/金 + 龸 + の/禾 = 鍜
- - か/金 + 龸 + る/忄 = 鐶
- - か/金 + 龸 + ろ/十 = 鑞
- - さ/阝 + 龸 + な/亻 = 陝
- - お/頁 + 龸 + け/犬 = 頸
- - せ/食 + 龸 + け/犬 = 飫
- - せ/食 + 龸 + ほ/方 = 餔
- - せ/食 + 龸 + ら/月 = 餾
- - せ/食 + 龸 + ま/石 = 饅
- - そ/馬 + 龸 + と/戸 = 駢
- - せ/食 + 龸 + つ/土 = 鯒
- - せ/食 + 龸 + す/発 = 鰒
- - せ/食 + 龸 + ⺼ = 鰛
- - な/亻 + 龸 + せ/食 = 鳰
- - ろ/十 + 龸 + せ/食 = 鴇
- - よ/广 + 龸 + せ/食 = 鴈
- - ひ/辶 + 龸 + せ/食 = 鴕
- - れ/口 + 龸 + せ/食 = 鴣
- - む/車 + 龸 + せ/食 = 鴾
- - り/分 + 龸 + せ/食 = 鴿
- - ゆ/彳 + 龸 + せ/食 = 鵄
- - み/耳 + 龸 + せ/食 = 鵈
- - を/貝 + 龸 + せ/食 = 鵙
- - 囗 + 龸 + せ/食 = 鵡
- - 龸 + 龸 + せ/食 = 鵺
- - か/金 + 龸 + せ/食 = 鷂
- - め/目 + 龸 + せ/食 = 鷏
- - と/戸 + 龸 + せ/食 = 鷓
- - つ/土 + 龸 + せ/食 = 鷙
- - 宿 + 宿 + 龸 = 亅
- - 数 + う/宀/#3 + 龸 = 卍
- - ゆ/彳 + 宿 + 龸 = 弥
- - 龸 + 囗 + ん/止 = 斌
- - き/木 + 龸 + 龸 = 橇
- - へ/⺩ + 宿 + 龸 = 珎
- - 龸 + selector 4 + 火 = 韭
