= Braille pattern dots-23 =

Braille pattern

6-dot braille cells
⠀	⠁	⠃	⠉	⠙	⠑	⠋	⠛	⠓	⠊	⠚	⠈	⠘
⠄	⠅	⠇	⠍	⠝	⠕	⠏	⠟	⠗	⠎	⠞	⠌	⠜
⠤	⠥	⠧	⠭	⠽	⠵	⠯	⠿	⠷	⠮	⠾	⠬	⠼
⠠	⠡	⠣	⠩	⠹	⠱	⠫	⠻	⠳	⠪	⠺	⠨	⠸
shift down	⠂	⠆	⠒	⠲	⠢	⠖	⠶	⠦	⠔	⠴	⠐	⠰

The Braille pattern dots-23 ( ⠆ ) is a 6-dot braille cell with the middle and bottom left dots raised, or an 8-dot braille cell with the two middle-left dots raised. It is represented by the Unicode code point U+2806, and in Braille ASCII with the number "2".

Character information
Preview	⠆ (braille pattern dots-23)	
Unicode name	BRAILLE PATTERN DOTS-23	
Encodings	decimal	hex
Unicode	10246	U+2806
UTF-8	226 160 134	E2 A0 86
Numeric character reference	&#10246;	&#x2806;
Braille ASCII	50	32

== Unified Braille ==
In unified international braille, the braille pattern dots-23 is used to represent a voiced bilabial consonant, such as /b/ or /ɓ/ when multiple letters correspond to these values, and is otherwise assigned as punctuation or accent mark, as needed.

=== Table of unified braille values ===
French Braille	; (semicolon), br, ui
English Braille	; (semicolon), -bb-
English Contraction	be, be-
German Braille	be
Bharati Braille	; (semicolon)
Russian Braille	; (semicolon)
Slovak Braille	; (semicolon)
Arabic Braille	ـً (fathatan)
Thai Braille	ี ī

== Other braille ==
Japanese Braille	wi / ゐ / ヰ
Korean Braille	-ch / ㅊ
Mainland Chinese Braille	tone 4
Taiwanese Braille	, (comma)
Nemeth Braille	2

== Plus dots 7 and 8 ==
Related to Braille pattern dots-23 are Braille patterns 237, 238, and 2378, which are used in 8-dot braille systems, such as Gardner-Salinas and Luxembourgish Braille.

Character information
Preview	⡆ (braille pattern dots-237)		⢆ (braille pattern dots-238)		⣆ (braille pattern dots-2378)	
Unicode name	BRAILLE PATTERN DOTS-237		BRAILLE PATTERN DOTS-238		BRAILLE PATTERN DOTS-2378	
Encodings	decimal	hex	dec	hex	dec	hex
Unicode	10310	U+2846	10374	U+2886	10438	U+28C6
UTF-8	226 161 134	E2 A1 86	226 162 134	E2 A2 86	226 163 134	E2 A3 86
Numeric character reference	&#10310;	&#x2846;	&#10374;	&#x2886;	&#10438;	&#x28C6;

	dots 237	dots 238	dots 2378
Gardner Salinas Braille	end array line	( (open parenthesis)	open complex radicand

== Related 8-dot kantenji patterns ==
In the Japanese kantenji braille, the standard 8-dot Braille patterns 37, 137, 347, and 1347 are the patterns related to Braille pattern dots-23, since the two additional dots of kantenji patterns 023, 237, and 0237 are placed above the base 6-dot cell, instead of below, as in standard 8-dot braille.

Character information
Preview	⡄ (braille pattern dots-37)		⡅ (braille pattern dots-137)		⡌ (braille pattern dots-347)		⡍ (braille pattern dots-1347)	
Unicode name	BRAILLE PATTERN DOTS-37		BRAILLE PATTERN DOTS-137		BRAILLE PATTERN DOTS-347		BRAILLE PATTERN DOTS-1347	
Encodings	decimal	hex	dec	hex	dec	hex	dec	hex
Unicode	10308	U+2844	10309	U+2845	10316	U+284C	10317	U+284D
UTF-8	226 161 132	E2 A1 84	226 161 133	E2 A1 85	226 161 140	E2 A1 8C	226 161 141	E2 A1 8D
Numeric character reference	&#10308;	&#x2844;	&#10309;	&#x2845;	&#10316;	&#x284C;	&#10317;	&#x284D;

=== Kantenji using braille patterns 37, 137, 347, or 1347 ===
This listing includes kantenji using Braille pattern dots-23 for all 6349 kanji found in JIS C 6226-1978.

- - 系

==== Variants and thematic compounds ====
- - selector 1 + ゐ/幺 = 乃
- - selector 4 + ゐ/幺 = 及
- - selector 5 + ゐ/幺 = 亥
- - ゐ/幺 + selector 1 = 幼
- - ゐ/幺 + selector 3 = 幺
- - ゐ/幺 + selector 4 = 幻
- - 比 + ゐ/幺 = 左

==== Compounds of 系 ====
- - な/亻 + ゐ/幺 = 係
- - こ/子 + ゐ/幺 = 孫
  - - ひ/辶 + こ/子 + ゐ/幺 = 遜
- - 氷/氵 + ゐ/幺 = 潔
- - へ/⺩ + ゐ/幺 = 素
- - ろ/十 + ゐ/幺 = 索
- - た/⽥ + ゐ/幺 = 累
  - - や/疒 + た/⽥ + ゐ/幺 = 瘰
  - - い/糹/#2 + た/⽥ + ゐ/幺 = 縲
  - - む/車 + た/⽥ + ゐ/幺 = 螺
  - - そ/馬 + た/⽥ + ゐ/幺 = 騾
- - は/辶 + ゐ/幺 = 繁
- - む/車 + ゐ/幺 = 繋
- - ち/竹 + ゐ/幺 = 纂
- - ゐ/幺 + こ/子 = 紅
- - ゐ/幺 + 龸 = 紋
- - ゐ/幺 + 仁/亻 = 納
- - ゐ/幺 + ひ/辶 = 紐
- - ゐ/幺 + る/忄 = 紺
- - ゐ/幺 + れ/口 = 結
- - ゐ/幺 + し/巿 = 絶
- - ゐ/幺 + ゆ/彳 = 網
- - ゐ/幺 + ゑ/訁 = 綴
- - ゐ/幺 + め/目 = 綿
- - ゐ/幺 + す/発 = 緊
- - ゐ/幺 + 火 = 緋
- - ゐ/幺 + 日 = 緒
- - ゐ/幺 + い/糹/#2 = 緯
- - ゐ/幺 + そ/馬 = 縁
  - - 心 + ゐ/幺 + そ/馬 = 櫞
- - ゐ/幺 + ら/月 = 縋
- - ゐ/幺 + え/訁 = 縞
- - ゐ/幺 + ほ/方 = 縫
- - ゐ/幺 + た/⽥ = 繹
- - ゐ/幺 + よ/广 = 纏
  - - ゐ/幺 + ゐ/幺 + よ/广 = 纒
- - め/目 + ゐ/幺 = 県
  - - め/目 + め/目 + ゐ/幺 = 縣
- - ゆ/彳 + 宿 + ゐ/幺 = 徽
- - ゐ/幺 + 宿 + め/目 = 緜
- - ゐ/幺 + へ/⺩ + は/辶 = 纛
- - せ/食 + 龸 + ゐ/幺 = 鯀
- - ゐ/幺 + 宿 + こ/子 = 絳
- - ゐ/幺 + 龸 + ゑ/訁 = 綬
- - ゐ/幺 + ほ/方 + そ/馬 = 緲
- - ら/月 + け/犬 + ゐ/幺 = 縢
- - ゐ/幺 + 宿 + ろ/十 = 繚
- - む/車 + 宿 + ゐ/幺 = 辮

==== Compounds of 乃 ====
- - の/禾 + ゐ/幺 = 秀
  - - い/糹/#2 + の/禾 + ゐ/幺 = 綉
  - - え/訁 + ゐ/幺 = 誘
  - - ひ/辶 + ゐ/幺 = 透
  - - 心 + の/禾 + ゐ/幺 = 莠
  - - か/金 + の/禾 + ゐ/幺 = 銹
- - ゐ/幺 + て/扌 = 携
- - な/亻 + selector 1 + ゐ/幺 = 仍
- - こ/子 + selector 1 + ゐ/幺 = 孕
- - き/木 + selector 1 + ゐ/幺 = 朶
  - - み/耳 + selector 1 + ゐ/幺 = 躱
- - ゐ/幺 + 宿 + ⺼ = 盈

==== Compounds of 及 ====
- - て/扌 + ゐ/幺 = 扱
- - れ/口 + ゐ/幺 = 吸
- - い/糹/#2 + ゐ/幺 = 級
- - や/疒 + selector 4 + ゐ/幺 = 岌
- - に/氵 + selector 4 + ゐ/幺 = 汲
- - ち/竹 + selector 4 + ゐ/幺 = 笈

==== Compounds of 亥 ====
- - き/木 + ゐ/幺 = 核
- - ゑ/訁 + ゐ/幺 = 該
- - か/金 + ゐ/幺 = 骸
- - ゐ/幺 + ね/示 = 刻
- - ゐ/幺 + ぬ/力 = 劾
- - つ/土 + selector 5 + ゐ/幺 = 垓
- - こ/子 + selector 5 + ゐ/幺 = 孩
- - そ/馬 + selector 5 + ゐ/幺 = 駭
- - れ/口 + 宿 + ゐ/幺 = 咳

==== Compounds of 幼 ====
- - て/扌 + ゐ/幺 + selector 1 = 拗
- - う/宀/#3 + ゐ/幺 + selector 1 = 窈
- - し/巿 + ゐ/幺 + selector 1 = 黝

==== Compounds of 幺 ====
- - ゐ/幺 + ゐ/幺 = 幽
- - ゆ/彳 + ゐ/幺 = 後
- - に/氵 + ゐ/幺 = 滋
- - 龸 + ゐ/幺 = 玄
  - - や/疒 + 龸 + ゐ/幺 = 痃
  - - め/目 + 龸 + ゐ/幺 = 眩
  - - い/糹/#2 + 龸 + ゐ/幺 = 絃
  - - ふ/女 + 龸 + ゐ/幺 = 舷
  - - ゆ/彳 + 龸 + ゐ/幺 = 衒
  - - か/金 + 龸 + ゐ/幺 = 鉉
- - 囗 + ゐ/幺 = 畿
- - ま/石 + ゐ/幺 = 磁
- - 日 + ゐ/幺 = 楽
  - - く/艹 + ゐ/幺 = 薬
    - - く/艹 + く/艹 + ゐ/幺 = 藥
  - - 日 + 日 + ゐ/幺 = 樂
    - - て/扌 + 日 + ゐ/幺 = 擽
    - - 火 + 日 + ゐ/幺 = 爍
    - - ま/石 + 日 + ゐ/幺 = 礫
    - - む/車 + 日 + ゐ/幺 = 轢
    - - か/金 + 日 + ゐ/幺 = 鑠
  - - 心 + 日 + ゐ/幺 = 檪
- - み/耳 + ゐ/幺 = 蹊
- - ゐ/幺 + 囗 = 幾
  - - え/訁 + ゐ/幺 + 囗 = 譏
  - - せ/食 + ゐ/幺 + 囗 = 饑
- - ゐ/幺 + 心 = 慈
- - ゐ/幺 + や/疒 = 郷
  - - ゐ/幺 + ま/石 = 響
  - - せ/食 + ゐ/幺 = 饗
  - - 囗 + ゐ/幺 + や/疒 = 嚮
- - ゐ/幺 + に/氵 = 渓
  - - ゐ/幺 + ゐ/幺 + に/氵 = 溪
- - ゐ/幺 + せ/食 = 鶏
  - - ゐ/幺 + ゐ/幺 + せ/食 = 鷄
- - お/頁 + ゐ/幺 = 顕
  - - お/頁 + お/頁 + ゐ/幺 = 顯
- - く/艹 + ゐ/幺 + ゐ/幺 = 茲
- - こ/子 + 宿 + ゐ/幺 = 孳
- - み/耳 + 龸 + ゐ/幺 = 聨
- - み/耳 + 宿 + ゐ/幺 = 聯
- - ゐ/幺 + た/⽥ + selector 1 = 谿
- - せ/食 + 宿 + ゐ/幺 = 酳
- - ゐ/幺 + 心 + ま/石 = 麼

==== Compounds of 左 ====
- - 仁/亻 + ゐ/幺 = 佐

==== Other compounds ====
- - つ/土 + ゐ/幺 = 報
- - ら/月 + ゐ/幺 = 服
  - - ち/竹 + ら/月 + ゐ/幺 = 箙
- - そ/馬 + の/禾 + ゐ/幺 = 羲
