= Braille pattern dots-46 =

Braille pattern

6-dot braille cells
⠀	⠁	⠃	⠉	⠙	⠑	⠋	⠛	⠓	⠊	⠚	⠈	⠘
⠄	⠅	⠇	⠍	⠝	⠕	⠏	⠟	⠗	⠎	⠞	⠌	⠜
⠤	⠥	⠧	⠭	⠽	⠵	⠯	⠿	⠷	⠮	⠾	⠬	⠼
⠠	⠡	⠣	⠩	⠹	⠱	⠫	⠻	⠳	⠪	⠺	⠨	⠸
shift down	⠂	⠆	⠒	⠲	⠢	⠖	⠶	⠦	⠔	⠴	⠐	⠰

The Braille pattern dots-46 ( ⠨ ) is a 6-dot braille cell with the top and bottom right dots raised, or an 8-dot braille cell with the top and lower-middle right dots raised. It is represented by the Unicode code point U+2828, and in Braille ASCII with a period: "." .

Character information
Preview	⠨ (braille pattern dots-46)	
Unicode name	BRAILLE PATTERN DOTS-46	
Encodings	decimal	hex
Unicode	10280	U+2828
UTF-8	226 160 168	E2 A0 A8
Numeric character reference	&#10280;	&#x2828;
Braille ASCII	46	2E

== Unified Braille ==
In unified international braille, the braille pattern dots-46 is used to represent an unvoiced dorsal plosive, such as /k/ or /q/ when multiple letters correspond to these values, and is otherwise assigned as needed.

=== Table of unified braille values ===
French Braille	Capital sign, eur
English Braille	. (decimal point only), emphasis formatting sign
German Braille	$ (dollar sign), ck
Bharati Braille	ख / ਖ / ખ / খ / ଖ / ఖ / ಖ / ഖ / ඛ / کھ
Icelandic Braille	% (percent sign)
IPA Braille	Greek letter fricatives modifier
Russian Braille	Capital sign
Slovak Braille	Ĺ
Arabic Braille	إ

== Other braille ==
Japanese Braille	yōon + handakuten
Korean Braille	j / ㅈ
Taiwanese Braille	yang, -iang / ㄧㄤ
Two-Cell Chinese Braille	Proper name sign
Nemeth Braille	decimal point, inner √, italic format, Greek letter sign

== Plus dots 7 and 8 ==
Related to Braille pattern dots-46 are Braille patterns 467, 468, and 4678, which are used in 8-dot braille systems, such as Gardner-Salinas and Luxembourgish Braille.

Character information
Preview	⡨ (braille pattern dots-467)		⢨ (braille pattern dots-468)		⣨ (braille pattern dots-4678)	
Unicode name	BRAILLE PATTERN DOTS-467		BRAILLE PATTERN DOTS-468		BRAILLE PATTERN DOTS-4678	
Encodings	decimal	hex	dec	hex	dec	hex
Unicode	10344	U+2868	10408	U+28A8	10472	U+28E8
UTF-8	226 161 168	E2 A1 A8	226 162 168	E2 A2 A8	226 163 168	E2 A3 A8
Numeric character reference	&#10344;	&#x2868;	&#10408;	&#x28A8;	&#10472;	&#x28E8;

	dots 467	dots 468	dots 4678
Gardner Salinas Braille		italic indicator	roman type indicator

== Related 8-dot kantenji patterns ==
In the Japanese kantenji braille, the standard 8-dot Braille patterns 58, 158, 458, and 1458 are the patterns related to Braille pattern dots-46, since the two additional dots of kantenji patterns 046, 467, and 0467 are placed above the base 6-dot cell, instead of below, as in standard 8-dot braille.

Character information
Preview	⢐ (braille pattern dots-58)		⢑ (braille pattern dots-158)		⢘ (braille pattern dots-458)		⢙ (braille pattern dots-1458)	
Unicode name	BRAILLE PATTERN DOTS-58		BRAILLE PATTERN DOTS-158		BRAILLE PATTERN DOTS-458		BRAILLE PATTERN DOTS-1458	
Encodings	decimal	hex	dec	hex	dec	hex	dec	hex
Unicode	10384	U+2890	10385	U+2891	10392	U+2898	10393	U+2899
UTF-8	226 162 144	E2 A2 90	226 162 145	E2 A2 91	226 162 152	E2 A2 98	226 162 153	E2 A2 99
Numeric character reference	&#10384;	&#x2890;	&#10385;	&#x2891;	&#10392;	&#x2898;	&#10393;	&#x2899;

=== Kantenji using braille patterns 58, 158, 458, or 1458 ===
This listing includes kantenji using Braille pattern dots-46 for all 6349 kanji found in JIS C 6226-1978.

- - 仁

==== Variants and thematic compounds ====
- - selector 3 + 仁/亻 = 尢
- - selector 4 + 仁/亻 = 司
  - - selector 4 + selector 4 + 仁/亻 = 旡
- - selector 5 + 仁/亻 = 爰
- - selector 6 + 仁/亻 = 尤
  - - selector 6 + selector 6 + 仁/亻 = 无
- - 仁/亻 + selector 6 = 像

==== Compounds of 仁 and 亻 ====
- - お/頁 + 仁/亻 = 仇
- - 囗 + 仁/亻 = 内
  - - ゐ/幺 + 仁/亻 = 納
  - - れ/口 + 囗 + 仁/亻 = 吶
  - - ⺼ + 囗 + 仁/亻 = 肭
  - - む/車 + 囗 + 仁/亻 = 蚋
  - - ね/示 + 囗 + 仁/亻 = 衲
  - - え/訁 + 囗 + 仁/亻 = 訥
  - - と/戸 + 囗 + 仁/亻 = 靹
- - 仁/亻 + よ/广 = 仄
  - - 日 + 仁/亻 + よ/广 = 昃
- - 仁/亻 + め/目 = 仏
  - - 仁/亻 + 仁/亻 + め/目 = 佛
- - 仁/亻 + こ/子 = 仔
- - 仁/亻 + 囗 = 代
  - - つ/土 + 仁/亻 + 囗 = 垈
  - - や/疒 + 仁/亻 + 囗 = 岱
  - - へ/⺩ + 仁/亻 + 囗 = 玳
  - - し/巿 + 仁/亻 + 囗 = 黛
- - 仁/亻 + に/氵 = 任
  - - ふ/女 + 仁/亻 + に/氵 = 姙
  - - る/忄 + 仁/亻 + に/氵 = 恁
  - - 心 + 仁/亻 + に/氵 = 荏
  - - ね/示 + 仁/亻 + に/氵 = 袵
- - 仁/亻 + 日 = 伯
- - れ/口 + 仁/亻 = 吏
  - - 仁/亻 + 仁/亻 = 使
    - - 仁/亻 + な/亻 = 便
      - - と/戸 + 仁/亻 + な/亻 = 鞭
- - 仁/亻 + は/辶 = 伴
- - 仁/亻 + し/巿 = 伸
- - 仁/亻 + れ/口 = 伽
- - 仁/亻 + ゐ/幺 = 佐
- - 仁/亻 + ひ/辶 = 佗
- - 仁/亻 + さ/阝 = 作
  - - ち/竹 + 仁/亻 + さ/阝 = 筰
- - 仁/亻 + つ/土 = 佳
- - 仁/亻 + や/疒 = 侯
  - - け/犬 + 仁/亻 + や/疒 = 猴
  - - ち/竹 + 仁/亻 + や/疒 = 篌
- - 仁/亻 + ゑ/訁 = 侵
- - 仁/亻 + み/耳 = 侶
- - 仁/亻 + ね/示 = 俵
- - 仁/亻 + 心 = 俺
- - 仁/亻 + ま/石 = 倍
- - 仁/亻 + ほ/方 = 倣
- - 仁/亻 + り/分 = 倹
  - - 仁/亻 + 仁/亻 + り/分 = 儉
- - 仁/亻 + へ/⺩ = 偏
- - 仁/亻 + て/扌 = 停
- - 仁/亻 + る/忄 = 偲
- - 仁/亻 + ぬ/力 = 側
- - 仁/亻 + と/戸 = 偵
- - 仁/亻 + 火 = 偽
  - - 仁/亻 + 仁/亻 + 火 = 僞
- - 仁/亻 + け/犬 = 傑
- - 仁/亻 + い/糹/#2 = 催
- - 仁/亻 + 数 = 傷
- - 仁/亻 + き/木 = 僅
- - 仁/亻 + の/禾 = 僑
- - 仁/亻 + そ/馬 = 僧
- - 仁/亻 + を/貝 = 償
- - 仁/亻 + え/訁 = 儲
- - 仁/亻 + 比 = 化
  - - え/訁 + 仁/亻 + 比 = 訛
  - - と/戸 + 仁/亻 + 比 = 靴
- - 仁/亻 + ふ/女 = 巫
  - - よ/广 + 仁/亻 = 坐
    - - て/扌 + よ/广 + 仁/亻 = 挫
  - - れ/口 + 仁/亻 + ふ/女 = 噬
  - - ち/竹 + 仁/亻 + ふ/女 = 筮
  - - え/訁 + 仁/亻 + ふ/女 = 誣
- - 仁/亻 + 氷/氵 = 攸
  - - 仁/亻 + ゆ/彳 = 悠
  - - ち/竹 + 仁/亻 + ゆ/彳 = 筱
  - - い/糹/#2 + 仁/亻 + ゆ/彳 = 絛
  - - ⺼ + 仁/亻 + ゆ/彳 = 脩
- - な/亻 + 宿 + 仁/亻 = 从
- - 仁/亻 + や/疒 + selector 1 = 仙
- - 仁/亻 + selector 1 + ぬ/力 = 仭
- - 仁/亻 + お/頁 + ろ/十 = 伜
- - 仁/亻 + 宿 + て/扌 = 佇
- - 仁/亻 + 宿 + ふ/女 = 佞
- - 仁/亻 + ほ/方 + ふ/女 = 侫
- - 仁/亻 + 宿 + つ/土 = 俑
- - 仁/亻 + 宿 + 氷/氵 = 傚
- - 仁/亻 + も/門 + selector 3 = 傴
- - 仁/亻 + 宿 + さ/阝 = 僊
- - 仁/亻 + 日 + け/犬 = 僭
- - 仁/亻 + ふ/女 + 火 = 儘
- - 仁/亻 + 龸 + 龸 = 凭
- - 仁/亻 + め/目 + 宿 = 覡

==== Compounds of 司 and 旡 ====
- - な/亻 + 仁/亻 = 伺
- - へ/⺩ + 仁/亻 = 嗣
- - や/疒 + 仁/亻 = 既
  - - る/忄 + 仁/亻 = 慨
  - - き/木 + 仁/亻 = 概
  - - よ/广 + や/疒 + 仁/亻 = 廐
  - - 日 + や/疒 + 仁/亻 = 曁
- - ね/示 + 仁/亻 = 祠
- - め/目 + 仁/亻 = 覗
- - え/訁 + 仁/亻 = 詞
- - せ/食 + 仁/亻 = 飼
- - ち/竹 + selector 4 + 仁/亻 = 笥
- - よ/广 + 宿 + 仁/亻 = 厩
- - 氷/氵 + 宿 + 仁/亻 = 漑

==== Compounds of 爰 ====
- - ふ/女 + 仁/亻 = 媛
- - て/扌 + 仁/亻 = 援
- - 日 + 仁/亻 = 暖
- - い/糹/#2 + 仁/亻 = 緩
- - に/氵 + 宿 + 仁/亻 = 湲
- - 火 + 宿 + 仁/亻 = 煖

==== Compounds of 尤 and 无 ====
- - 龸 + 仁/亻 = 就
  - - み/耳 + 仁/亻 = 蹴
  - - 仁/亻 + せ/食 = 鷲
- - の/禾 + 仁/亻 = 稽
- - ⺼ + selector 6 + 仁/亻 = 肬
- - け/犬 + 宿 + 仁/亻 = 犹
- - や/疒 + 宿 + 仁/亻 = 疣

==== Other compounds ====
- - 氷/氵 + 仁/亻 = 冶
- - け/犬 + 仁/亻 = 奈
  - - て/扌 + け/犬 + 仁/亻 = 捺
- - ⺼ + 仁/亻 = 脊
  - - や/疒 + ⺼ + 仁/亻 = 瘠
  - - み/耳 + ⺼ + 仁/亻 = 蹐
- - ち/竹 + 仁/亻 = 霊
  - - ち/竹 + ち/竹 + 仁/亻 = 靈
- - 仁/亻 + ん/止 = 企
- - と/戸 + 仁/亻 = 尼
  - - に/氵 + 仁/亻 = 泥
  - - る/忄 + と/戸 + 仁/亻 = 怩
  - - 日 + と/戸 + 仁/亻 = 昵
  - - め/目 + と/戸 + 仁/亻 = 眤
- - 仁/亻 + 宿 = 介
  - - 心 + 仁/亻 = 芥
  - - り/分 + 仁/亻 + 宿 = 个
  - - な/亻 + 仁/亻 + 宿 = 价
  - - た/⽥ + 仁/亻 + 宿 = 畍
  - - や/疒 + 仁/亻 + 宿 = 疥
- - 仁/亻 + ろ/十 = 令
  - - 仁/亻 + お/頁 = 領
  - - な/亻 + 仁/亻 + ろ/十 = 伶
  - - 囗 + 仁/亻 + ろ/十 = 囹
  - - る/忄 + 仁/亻 + ろ/十 = 怜
  - - そ/馬 + 仁/亻 + ろ/十 = 羚
  - - み/耳 + 仁/亻 + ろ/十 = 聆
  - - 心 + 仁/亻 + ろ/十 = 苓
  - - む/車 + 仁/亻 + ろ/十 = 蛉
- - と/戸 + 宿 + 仁/亻 = 丱
- - て/扌 + 宿 + 仁/亻 = 托
- - 仁/亻 + 宿 + せ/食 = 鶺
