= Braille kanji =

Braille for transcribing written Japanese

Kantenji 漢点字 ⢱⢚⠷⣸⠓⢜
- Script type: logographic
- Status: unofficial
- Print basis: kanji
- Languages: Japanese

Related scripts
- Parent systems: Night writing: Braille; Japanese Braille; Kantenji

Braille Kanji (Japanese: 漢点字, Hepburn: Kantenji; lit. Chinese dot characters) is a system of braille for transcribing written Japanese. It was devised in 1969 by Tai'ichi Kawakami (川上 泰一), a teacher at the Osaka School for the Blind, and was still being revised in 1991. It supplements Japanese Braille by providing a means of directly encoding kanji characters without having to first convert them to kana. It uses an 8-dot braille cell, with the lower six dots corresponding to the cells of standard Japanese Braille, and the upper two dots indicating the constituent parts of the kanji. The upper dots are numbered 0 (upper left) and 7 (upper right), the opposite convention of 8-dot braille in Western countries, where the extra dots are added to the bottom of the cell. A kanji will be transcribed by anywhere from one to three braille cells.

== Principles ==
Kantenji braille cell with diacritical upper dots 0 and 7

Only kanji use the upper dots 0 and 7. A cell occupying only dots 1–6 is to be read as kana, or less commonly as the middle element of a three-cell kanji.

Kana readings are used to derive common kanji elements that share that reading. For example, the kana ⢆ き ki is used for elements based on the kanji 木, which has ki as one of its basic pronunciations. The two upper dots are then used to indicate whether this is a whole character, 木, or an element of a compound character. For a whole character, both upper dots are added, for ⢏ 木 ki. For a partial character, one upper dot is used: The left upper dot alone indicates the first (left, top, or outside) constituent part of a kanji, as in ⢇⢮ 村, and the right upper dot alone signals the final (right, bottom, or inside) constituent part of a kanji, as in ⢇⢎ 林. For those kanji where an element is repeated more than once, a suffix corresponding derived from the braille digit plus a right upper dot indicates the number of times an element occurs, as in ⢇⠚ = 森.

That is, the kana ⢆ き ki is the basis for the kanji ⢏ 木 ki, as well as the two components of ⢇⢎ 林 hayashi, and combined with the digit ⠒ ３ it forms ⢇⠚ 森 mori.

Kantenji are frequently abbreviated. For example, the kana ⠒ う u is used for the 'roof' radical, 宀, which is conventionally pronounced u. Thus, combined with the kanji ⢝ 子 ko (from the kana ⢔ こ ko), it forms the compound character ⠓⢜ 字 ji (as in 漢字 kanji). However, in print the 'roof' radical is not normally used as an independent kanji, so in kantenji it is used as an abbreviation for the most common kanji with the roof radical, ⠛ 家 ie "house".

A more extreme abbreviation is 恋 koi "love". In print this is (historically) 糸 + 言 + 糸 on the top plus 心 on the bottom, but in kantenji it is abbreviated to 言 + 心, for ⠗⢬ 恋 koi.

Because there are only 63 six-dot patterns that kantenji can be based on, while there are significantly more elements from which kanji are built in print (for instance, the 214 radicals), each of the kantenji patterns corresponds to several components in print. Most are visually or thematically linked. For example, the kana そ so is the arbitrary basis for the kanji ⢽ 馬 uma "horse". From there, three kanji for farm animals are derived by adding a "selector" (a pattern with a single lower dot): ⢵⠊ (馬 + selector 1) 牛 ushi "cattle", ⢵⠌ (馬 + selector 2) 羊 hitsuji "sheep", and ⢵⡈ (馬 + selector 3) 豚 buta "pig". The kanji 曽 sō, on the other hand, is based on the same braille pattern, despite having nothing to do with the horse radical or its meaning, because it is the historical basis of the kana そ so. Thus ⠑⢼ (selector 4 + 馬) is 曽 sō. The selectors are generally only used for individual kanji. When 馬, 牛, 羊, 豚, or 曽 used as components of compound kanji in print, all are most commonly written as ⢵ or ⢼ in braille.

The order of the cells is sometimes reversed to distinguish kanji that would otherwise be written the same in braille. For example, 料 is written ⡵⡜ (斗 + 私) to distinguish it from ⡕⡼ 科 (私 + 斗). Tricks such as reordering and abbreviation help use the 4,000 two-cell combinations. However, for rarer kanji, three cells are required. The middle cell may be a selector, as in ⡇⠐⡌ 汲 (水 + selector 5 + 系), or a kanji element, as in ⣗⠢⡪ 瑠 (玉 + 月 + 田).

=== Kantenji elements ===
The 63 basic 6-dot braille patterns are used to define 57 kanji elements and six selectors that build more complex characters from constituent parts. The blank 6-dot braille pattern always indicates a space, and is otherwise unused in kantenji. Numerals are as in international braille (without the number indicator).

Standard Japanese Braille kana and Kantenji assignments
Kantenji cell	Kana	Kantenji element	Kantenji cell	Kana	Kantenji element	Kantenji cell	Kana	Kantenji element	Kantenji cell	Kana	Kantenji element
⠀ (braille pattern blank)	space	—	⠂ (braille pattern dots-2)	あ	selector 1 / １	⠄ (braille pattern dots-3)	sokuon	selector 2	⠆ (braille pattern dots-23)	い	糹 / ２
⡀ (braille pattern dots-7)	わ	selector 3	⡂ (braille pattern dots-27)	な	亻	⡄ (braille pattern dots-37)	ゐ	幺	⡆ (braille pattern dots-237)	に	氵
⠐ (braille pattern dots-5)	-y-	selector 4	⠒ (braille pattern dots-25)	う	宀 / ３	⠔ (braille pattern dots-35)	お	頁 / ９	⠖ (braille pattern dots-235)	え	訁 / ６
⡐ (braille pattern dots-57)	や	疒	⡒ (braille pattern dots-257)	ぬ	力	⡔ (braille pattern dots-357)	の	禾	⡖ (braille pattern dots-2357)	ね	示
⠠ (braille pattern dots-6)	゛	selector 5	⠢ (braille pattern dots-26)	ら	月 / ５	⠤ (braille pattern dots-36)	chōon	宿	⠦ (braille pattern dots-236)	り	分 / ８
⡠ (braille pattern dots-67)	を	貝	⡢ (braille pattern dots-267)	た	⽥	⡤ (braille pattern dots-367)	ゑ	訁	⡦ (braille pattern dots-2367)	ち	竹
⠰ (braille pattern dots-56)	-y- + ゛	比	⠲ (braille pattern dots-256)	る	忄 / ４	⠴ (braille pattern dots-356)	ろ	十 / ０	⠶ (braille pattern dots-2356)	れ	口 / ７
⡰ (braille pattern dots-567)	よ	广	⡲ (braille pattern dots-2567)	つ	土	⡴ (braille pattern dots-3567)	と	戸	⡶ (braille pattern dots-23567)	て	扌
⢀ (braille pattern dots-8)	゜	selector 6	⢂ (braille pattern dots-28)	か	金	⢄ (braille pattern dots-38)	？	⺼	⢆ (braille pattern dots-238)	き	木
⣀ (braille pattern dots-78)	「」	学 / 龸	⣂ (braille pattern dots-278)	は	辶	⣄ (braille pattern dots-378)	—	日	⣆ (braille pattern dots-2378)	ひ	辶
⢐ (braille pattern dots-58)	-y- + ゜	亻	⢒ (braille pattern dots-258)	く	艹	⢔ (braille pattern dots-358)	こ	子	⢖ (braille pattern dots-2358)	け	犬
⣐ (braille pattern dots-578)	ゆ	彳	⣒ (braille pattern dots-2578)	ふ	女	⣔ (braille pattern dots-3578)	ほ	方	⣖ (braille pattern dots-23578)	へ	⺩
⢠ (braille pattern dots-68)	、	数	⢢ (braille pattern dots-268)	さ	阝	⢤ (braille pattern dots-368)	。	心	⢦ (braille pattern dots-2368)	し	巿
⣠ (braille pattern dots-678)	ん	止	⣢ (braille pattern dots-2678)	ま	石	⣤ (braille pattern dots-3678)	（）	囗	⣦ (braille pattern dots-23678)	み	耳
⢰ (braille pattern dots-568)	-y- + ゛ + ゜	氵	⢲ (braille pattern dots-2568)	す	発	⢴ (braille pattern dots-3568)	そ	馬	⢶ (braille pattern dots-23568)	せ	食
⣰ (braille pattern dots-5678)	numbers	火	⣲ (braille pattern dots-25678)	む	車	⣴ (braille pattern dots-35678)	も	門	⣶ (braille pattern dots-235678)	め	目

=== Single-cell kantenji characters ===
Kantenji with both upper dots raised indicate a single-cell kantenji character. These are all common characters, and they generally define the archetype for character components based on a dot pattern.

糸	人	系	水	家	頁	言	病	力	私	示	月
宿	分	貝	⽥	語	竹	比	性	十	口	店	土
戸	⼿	金	肉	木	学	走	日	進	仁	草	子
犬	行	女	方	玉	数	都	心	巿	止	石	囲
耳	氷	発	馬	食	火	車	門	目			

=== Double-cell variant kantenji characters ===
Another kantenji form uses a base character with a selector (a 6-dot pattern with a single raised dot) either preceding or following to indicate a variant on the archetype of the dot pattern. When a base character is followed by selectors 4, 5, or 6, it usually indicates a variant with a single stroke added or removed from the base character. Variant kantenji are composed the same as a regular double-cell kantenji, with dot 0 (upper left) raised in the first cell, and dot 7 (upper right) raised in the second.

- そ/馬 + selector 1 = 牛
- そ/馬 + selector 2 = 羊
- そ/馬 + selector 3 = 豚
- selector 4 + そ/馬 = 曽
- や/病 + selector 1 = 山
- や/病 + selector 2 = 矢
- し/巿 + selector 1 = 色
- し/巿 + selector 3 = 巾
- き/木 + selector 4 = 未
- き/木 + selector 5 = 末
- き/木 + selector 6 = 本

=== Double-cell thematic kantenji characters ===
Some kantenji sharing a common element are linked thematically, rather than structurally. The first cell indicates the general concept, and the second cell will be a determiner, pinning down the specific meaning and the character associated with it. The determiner is usually by pronunciation, although determiners can be associated by meaning as well. For example, characters for numbers are all preceded by 数, and followed by a cell corresponding to its braille numeral or to a similar looking character, while the kantenji for colors are 色 followed by the initial kana from one of its pronunciations. Like the base kantenji of variants, thematic determiners can be used in making composed kantenji, e.g. せ/食 can be used for the element 青 in composed kantenji, as its thematic kantenji is し/色 + せ/食 = 青.

- し/色 + か/金 = 赤
- し/色 + く/草 = 黒
- し/色 + こ/子 = 黄
- し/色 + せ/食 = 青
- し/色 + み/耳 = 緑
- し/色 + む/車 = 紫
- 数 + ０ = 零
- 数 + １ = 一
- 数 + ２ = 二
- 数 + ３ = 三

and so on.

=== Double-cell composed kantenji characters ===
The most common kantenji form uses a two cell pattern, the first with the upper left dot raised, the second with the upper right raised. The dot patterns indicate the two basic elements that comprise the composed kanji. Note that variant elements are often represented by the base kantenji and thematic elements by their determiners.

- う/宀 + こ/子 = 字
- き/木 + き/木 = 林
- き/木 + め/目 = 相
- ろ/十 + め/目 = 直
- 学/龸 + ぬ/力 = 労
- 日 + せ/青 = 晴
- 氷/氵 + せ/青 = 清
- 亻 + そ/曽 = 僧

=== Duplicative and multi-cell composed kantenji ===
More complex kanji can be composed in two different ways, depending on whether they are composed of a single element, repeated, or multiple distinct elements. A kanji composed of a duplicated element can be indicated by a base character followed by the braille numeral counting repetitions of the element. Note that a single repeat is indicated by simply repeating the element in a standard double-cell kantenji. A complex kantenji can also be composed like a regular double-cell kantenji, adding a middle cell with neither upper dot raised. The last cell is always indicated by the upper right dot, no matter the length of the composed kantenji.

- き/木 + ３ = 森
- 火 + も/門 + ら/月 = 燗

=== Reversed kantenji ===
Some kantenji patterns can be used to write two or more common kanji, while reversing the elements would not signify any common characters. When this happens, the reversed form can be used to signify that second kanji.

- こ/子 + ふ/女 = 好 vs. - ふ/女 + こ/子 = 娯
- そ/羊 + に/水 = 洋 vs. - に/氵 + そ/馬 = 消
- ろ/才 + き/木 = 材 vs. - き/木 + ろ/十 = 枯
- め/目 + そ/羊 = 着 vs. - そ/馬 + め/目 = 省

== Text ==
A sample text:

⢛	⢇⣮	⠀	⠕⢺	⣿	⡇⠤⣨	⣫
草	枕		夏	目	漱	石

Kusamakura – Natsume Sōseki

⡑⣌	⡆	⡃⠮	⢖	⠠⣂	⣥⢈	⠠⢂	⣣⠊	⡲	⢤
智	に	働	け	ば	角	が	立	つ	。

Chi ni hatarakeba kado ga tatsu.

Approach everything rationally, and you become harsh.

⠳⢾	⡆	⢇⣄⡼	⢢	⢶	⠠⣂	⡇⢚	⢢	⠶	⠲	⢤
青	に	棹	さ	せ	ば	流	さ	れ	る	。

Jō ni sao saseba nagasareru.

Paddle along in the stream of emotions, and you will be swept away in the current.

⠃⡊	⡳⡮	⡠	⣃⡺	⢶	⠠⣂	⠥⣮	⡵⣞	⠠⡢	⢤
意	地	を	通	せ	ば	窮	屈	だ	。

Iji o tōseba kyūkutsu-da.

Give free rein to your desires, and you become uncomfortably confined.
