= Braille pattern dots-345 =

Braille pattern

6-dot braille cells
⠀	⠁	⠃	⠉	⠙	⠑	⠋	⠛	⠓	⠊	⠚	⠈	⠘
⠄	⠅	⠇	⠍	⠝	⠕	⠏	⠟	⠗	⠎	⠞	⠌	⠜
⠤	⠥	⠧	⠭	⠽	⠵	⠯	⠿	⠷	⠮	⠾	⠬	⠼
⠠	⠡	⠣	⠩	⠹	⠱	⠫	⠻	⠳	⠪	⠺	⠨	⠸
shift down	⠂	⠆	⠒	⠲	⠢	⠖	⠶	⠦	⠔	⠴	⠐	⠰

The Braille pattern dots-345 ( ⠜ ) is a 6-dot braille cell with the top and middle right and bottom left dots raised, or an 8-dot braille cell with the top and upper-middle right, and lower-middle left dots raised. It is represented by the Unicode code point U+281c, and in Braille ASCII with the greater-than sign: >.

Character information
Preview	⠜ (braille pattern dots-345)	
Unicode name	BRAILLE PATTERN DOTS-345	
Encodings	decimal	hex
Unicode	10268	U+281C
UTF-8	226 160 156	E2 A0 9C
Numeric character reference	&#10268;	&#x281C;
Braille ASCII	62	3E

== Unified Braille ==
In unified international braille, the braille pattern dots-345 is used to represent an unrounded open or near-open front vowel, such as /æ/ or /a/ when multiple letters correspond to these values, and is otherwise assigned as needed.

=== Table of unified braille values ===
French Braille	@, æ/ä, gl, em, "les"
English Braille	ar
English Contraction	ar
German Braille	Ä
Bharati Braille	आ / ਆ / આ / আ / ଆ / ఆ / ಆ / ആ / ஆ / ආ / آ
IPA Braille	/ɛ/
Russian Braille	Є
Slovak Braille	É
Irish Braille	ar
Thai Braille	ั a

== Other braille ==
Japanese Braille	yo / よ / ヨ
Korean Braille	ya / ㅑ
Mainland Chinese Braille	yao, -iao
Taiwanese Braille	a / ㄚ
Two-Cell Chinese Braille	di- -ēi, 地 de
Nemeth Braille	√
Gardner Salinas Braille	fraction slash

== Plus dots 7 and 8 ==
Related to Braille pattern dots-345 are Braille patterns 3457, 3458, and 34578, which are used in 8-dot braille systems, such as Gardner–Salinas and Luxembourgish Braille.

Character information
Preview	⡜ (braille pattern dots-3457)		⢜ (braille pattern dots-3458)		⣜ (braille pattern dots-34578)	
Unicode name	BRAILLE PATTERN DOTS-3457		BRAILLE PATTERN DOTS-3458		BRAILLE PATTERN DOTS-34578	
Encodings	decimal	hex	dec	hex	dec	hex
Unicode	10332	U+285C	10396	U+289C	10460	U+28DC
UTF-8	226 161 156	E2 A1 9C	226 162 156	E2 A2 9C	226 163 156	E2 A3 9C
Numeric character reference	&#10332;	&#x285C;	&#10396;	&#x289C;	&#10460;	&#x28DC;

	dots 3457	dots 3458	dots 34578
Gardner Salinas Braille		* (asterisk)	
Luxembourgish Braille		ä (minuscule)	Ä (capital)

== Related 8-dot kantenji patterns ==
In the Japanese kantenji braille, the standard 8-dot Braille patterns 567, 1567, 4567, and 14567 are the patterns related to Braille pattern dots-345, since the two additional dots of kantenji patterns 0345, 3457, and 03457 are placed above the base 6-dot cell, instead of below, as in standard 8-dot braille.

Character information
Preview	⡰ (braille pattern dots-567)		⡱ (braille pattern dots-1567)		⡸ (braille pattern dots-4567)		⡹ (braille pattern dots-14567)	
Unicode name	BRAILLE PATTERN DOTS-567		BRAILLE PATTERN DOTS-1567		BRAILLE PATTERN DOTS-4567		BRAILLE PATTERN DOTS-14567	
Encodings	decimal	hex	dec	hex	dec	hex	dec	hex
Unicode	10352	U+2870	10353	U+2871	10360	U+2878	10361	U+2879
UTF-8	226 161 176	E2 A1 B0	226 161 177	E2 A1 B1	226 161 184	E2 A1 B8	226 161 185	E2 A1 B9
Numeric character reference	&#10352;	&#x2870;	&#10353;	&#x2871;	&#10360;	&#x2878;	&#10361;	&#x2879;

=== Kantenji using braille patterns 567, 1567, 4567, or 14567 ===
This listing includes kantenji using Braille pattern dots-345 for all 6349 kanji found in JIS C 6226-1978.

- - 店

==== Variants and thematic compounds ====
- - selector 1 + よ/广 = 矛
- - selector 4 + よ/广 = 予
  - - selector 4 + selector 4 + よ/广 = 豫
- - selector 6 + よ/广 = 疋
- - よ/广 + selector 1 = 原
  - - よ/广 + selector 1 + selector 1 = 厂
- - よ/广 + selector 3 = 广
- - 数 + よ/广 = 丗

==== Compounds of 店 and 广 ====
- - よ/广 + し/巿 = 府
  - - な/亻 + よ/广 = 俯
  - - よ/广 + ⺼ = 腐
  - - き/木 + よ/广 + し/巿 = 椨
- - よ/广 + よ/广 = 序
- - よ/广 + も/門 = 唐
  - - つ/土 + よ/广 + も/門 = 塘
  - - に/氵 + よ/广 + も/門 = 溏
- - ゐ/幺 + よ/广 = 纏
  - - ゐ/幺 + ゐ/幺 + よ/广 = 纒
- - ⺼ + よ/广 = 膺
- - よ/广 + せ/食 = 席
  - - く/艹 + よ/广 + せ/食 = 蓆
- - よ/广 + ろ/十 = 庁
- - よ/广 + こ/子 = 広
  - - い/糹/#2 + よ/广 + こ/子 = 絋
  - - よ/广 + よ/广 + こ/子 = 廣
    - - つ/土 + よ/广 + こ/子 = 壙
    - - 日 + よ/广 + こ/子 = 曠
    - - ま/石 + よ/广 + こ/子 = 礦
- - よ/广 + 比 = 庇
- - よ/广 + き/木 = 床
  - - よ/广 + き/木 + め/目 = 廂
- - よ/广 + よ/广 = 序
- - よ/广 + ん/止 = 底
- - よ/广 + ゑ/訁 = 度
  - - か/金 + よ/广 + ゑ/訁 = 鍍
- - よ/广 + な/亻 = 座
  - - く/艹 + よ/广 + な/亻 = 蓙
- - よ/广 + む/車 = 庫
- - よ/广 + へ/⺩ = 庭
- - よ/广 + る/忄 = 庵
- - よ/广 + と/戸 = 庶
  - - ひ/辶 + よ/广 = 遮
  - - 心 + よ/广 + と/戸 = 蔗
  - - み/耳 + よ/广 + と/戸 = 蹠
- - よ/广 + ゆ/彳 = 康
  - - る/忄 + よ/广 + ゆ/彳 = 慷
  - - の/禾 + よ/广 + ゆ/彳 = 糠
  - - せ/食 + よ/广 + ゆ/彳 = 鱇
- - よ/广 + 囗 = 庸
  - - な/亻 + よ/广 + 囗 = 傭
  - - る/忄 + よ/广 + 囗 = 慵
- - よ/广 + す/発 = 廃
  - - よ/广 + よ/广 + す/発 = 廢
- - よ/广 + け/犬 = 廉
  - - に/氵 + よ/广 + け/犬 = 濂
  - - ち/竹 + よ/广 + け/犬 = 簾
- - よ/广 + や/疒 = 廊
- - よ/广 + 心 = 応
  - - よ/广 + よ/广 + 心 = 應
    - - み/耳 + よ/广 + 心 = 軈
- - よ/广 + て/扌 = 摩
- - よ/广 + ま/石 = 磨
- - よ/广 + に/氵 = 魔
- - selector 1 + よ/广 + ろ/十 = 廰
- - よ/广 + よ/广 + ろ/十 = 廳
- - よ/广 + も/門 + selector 2 = 庖
- - よ/广 + 宿 + そ/馬 = 庠
- - よ/广 + 宿 + ぬ/力 = 廁
- - よ/广 + 宿 + す/発 = 廈
- - よ/广 + 宿 + の/禾 = 廏
- - よ/广 + や/疒 + 仁/亻 = 廐
- - よ/广 + さ/阝 + こ/子 = 廓
- - よ/广 + む/車 + selector 2 = 廖
- - よ/广 + 宿 + と/戸 = 廚
- - よ/广 + し/巿 + く/艹 = 廛
- - よ/广 + 龸 + き/木 = 廝
- - よ/广 + ろ/十 + ⺼ = 廟
- - よ/广 + selector 6 + は/辶 = 廠
- - よ/广 + む/車 + 火 = 廡
- - よ/广 + 囗 + そ/馬 = 廨
- - よ/广 + 囗 + れ/口 = 廩
- - よ/广 + 宿 + た/⽥ = 廬
- - よ/广 + 囗 + ひ/辶 = 廱
- - よ/广 + よ/广 + ろ/十 = 廳
- - 日 + 宿 + よ/广 = 昿
- - よ/广 + 宿 + せ/食 = 鷹

==== Compounds of 矛 ====
- - き/木 + よ/广 = 柔
  - - て/扌 + き/木 + よ/广 = 揉
  - - の/禾 + き/木 + よ/广 = 糅
  - - み/耳 + き/木 + よ/广 = 蹂
  - - と/戸 + き/木 + よ/广 = 鞣
- - 心 + よ/广 = 茅
- - ち/竹 + よ/广 = 霧
- - よ/广 + ぬ/力 = 務
- - 心 + selector 1 + よ/广 = 楙
  - - る/忄 + selector 1 + よ/广 = 懋
- - ね/示 + selector 1 + よ/广 = 袤
- - え/訁 + selector 1 + よ/广 = 譎
- - 心 + 宿 + よ/广 = 橘
- - よ/广 + う/宀/#3 + せ/食 = 鶩
- - よ/广 + せ/食 + selector 1 = 鷸

==== Compounds of 予 and 豫 ====
- - り/分 + よ/广 = 野
  - - つ/土 + り/分 + よ/广 = 墅
- - お/頁 + よ/广 = 預
  - - 心 + お/頁 + よ/广 = 蕷
- - て/扌 + selector 4 + よ/广 = 抒
- - き/木 + selector 4 + よ/广 = 杼
- - り/分 + selector 4 + よ/广 = 舒

==== Compounds of 疋 ====
- - 日 + よ/广 = 是
  - - て/扌 + よ/广 = 提
  - - つ/土 + よ/广 = 堤
  - - う/宀/#3 + 日 + よ/广 = 寔
  - - せ/食 + 日 + よ/广 = 醍
- - ふ/女 + よ/广 = 婿
- - う/宀/#3 + よ/广 = 定
  - - か/金 + よ/广 = 錠
  - - て/扌 + う/宀/#3 + よ/广 = 掟
  - - に/氵 + う/宀/#3 + よ/广 = 淀
  - - ま/石 + う/宀/#3 + よ/广 = 碇
  - - い/糹/#2 + う/宀/#3 + よ/广 = 綻
  - - み/耳 + う/宀/#3 + よ/广 = 聢
  - - え/訁 + う/宀/#3 + よ/广 = 諚
- - ゆ/彳 + よ/广 = 従
  - - ゆ/彳 + ゆ/彳 + よ/广 = 從
    - - い/糹/#2 + よ/广 = 縦
      - - い/糹/#2 + い/糹/#2 + よ/广 = 縱
    - - る/忄 + ゆ/彳 + よ/广 = 慫
    - - 心 + ゆ/彳 + よ/广 = 樅
    - - み/耳 + ゆ/彳 + よ/广 = 蹤
- - ほ/方 + よ/广 = 旋
- - や/疒 + よ/广 = 疑
  - - や/疒 + や/疒 + よ/广 = 嶷
  - - ま/石 + や/疒 + よ/广 = 礙
- - よ/广 + 数 = 疎
- - よ/广 + く/艹 = 疏
  - - 心 + よ/广 + く/艹 = 蔬
- - よ/广 + た/⽥ = 蛋
- - ふ/女 + ふ/女 + よ/广 = 壻

==== Compounds of 原 and 厂 ====
- - る/忄 + よ/广 + selector 1 = 愿
- - 氷/氵 + よ/广 = 源
- - よ/广 + お/頁 = 願
- - 仁/亻 + よ/广 = 仄
  - - 日 + 仁/亻 + よ/广 = 昃
- - よ/广 + さ/阝 = 厄
  - - て/扌 + よ/广 + さ/阝 = 扼
  - - む/車 + よ/广 + さ/阝 = 軛
  - - さ/阝 + よ/广 + さ/阝 = 阨
- - よ/广 + 火 = 灰
  - - る/忄 + よ/广 + 火 = 恢
  - - え/訁 + よ/广 + 火 = 詼
- - よ/广 + り/分 = 厘
  - - か/金 + よ/广 + り/分 = 甅
  - - ま/石 + よ/广 + り/分 = 竰
  - - き/木 + よ/广 + り/分 = 釐
- - よ/广 + 日 = 厚
- - よ/广 + ら/月 = 厭
- - よ/广 + つ/土 = 圧
  - - よ/广 + よ/广 + つ/土 = 壓
- - よ/广 + め/目 = 盾
  - - き/木 + よ/广 + め/目 = 楯
- - よ/广 + を/貝 = 贋
- - よ/广 + れ/口 = 后
  - - え/訁 + よ/广 + れ/口 = 詬
  - - ひ/辶 + よ/广 + れ/口 = 逅
- - よ/广 + う/宀/#3 = 彦
  - - な/亻 + よ/广 + う/宀/#3 = 偐
- - よ/广 + い/糹/#2 = 産
  - - さ/阝 + よ/广 = 薩
- - よ/广 + 宿 + さ/阝 = 卮
- - よ/广 + 宿 + う/宀/#3 = 厖
- - よ/广 + を/貝 + ぬ/力 = 厠
- - よ/广 + ん/止 + selector 1 = 厥
- - よ/广 + お/頁 + す/発 = 厦
- - よ/广 + selector 5 + と/戸 = 厨
- - よ/广 + 宿 + 仁/亻 = 厩
- - よ/广 + 宿 + き/木 = 厮
- - よ/广 + 宿 + 氷/氵 = 厰
- - つ/土 + 宿 + よ/广 = 壥
- - よ/广 + 宿 + ひ/辶 = 巵
- - よ/广 + よ/广 + き/木 = 牀
- - や/疒 + 宿 + よ/广 = 癡
- - よ/广 + り/分 + selector 1 = 矜
- - ⺼ + 宿 + よ/广 = 胥
- - む/車 + 宿 + よ/广 = 蠣
- - み/耳 + 宿 + よ/广 = 躔
- - み/耳 + 龸 + よ/广 = 軅
- - よ/广 + め/目 + selector 4 = 靨
- - よ/广 + お/頁 + に/氵 = 魘
- - よ/广 + 龸 + せ/食 = 鴈

==== Compounds of 丗 ====
- - 龸 + よ/广 = 棄
  - - 龸 + 龸 + よ/广 = 弃
- - ろ/十 + よ/广 = 世
  - - れ/口 + よ/广 = 喋
  - - く/艹 + よ/广 = 葉
  - - む/車 + よ/广 = 蝶
  - - え/訁 + よ/广 = 諜
  - - を/貝 + よ/广 = 貰
  - - に/氵 + ろ/十 + よ/广 = 泄
  - - 心 + ろ/十 + よ/广 = 笹
  - - い/糹/#2 + ろ/十 + よ/广 = 紲
  - - き/木 + 宿 + よ/广 = 楪
  - - に/氵 + 宿 + よ/广 = 渫
  - - へ/⺩ + 宿 + よ/广 = 牒
  - - い/糹/#2 + 宿 + よ/广 = 緤
  - - せ/食 + 宿 + よ/广 = 鰈
- - し/巿 + よ/广 = 帯
  - - に/氵 + よ/广 = 滞
    - - に/氵 + に/氵 + よ/广 = 滯
  - - し/巿 + し/巿 + よ/广 = 帶
  - - く/艹 + し/巿 + よ/广 = 蔕
- - 数 + 数 + よ/广 = 卅

==== Other compounds ====
- - ま/石 + よ/广 = 碍
- - ね/示 + よ/广 = 祥
- - よ/广 + 氷/氵 = 厳
  - - よ/广 + よ/广 + 氷/氵 = 嚴
    - - な/亻 + よ/广 + 氷/氵 = 儼
- - よ/广 + 仁/亻 = 坐
  - - て/扌 + よ/广 + 仁/亻 = 挫
- - き/木 + よ/广 + ん/止 = 柢
- - よ/广 + よ/广 + き/木 = 牀
