= Braille pattern dots-6 =

Braille pattern

6-dot braille cells
| ⠀ | ⠁ | ⠃ | ⠉ | ⠙ | ⠑ | ⠋ | ⠛ | ⠓ | ⠊ | ⠚ | ⠈ | ⠘ |
| ⠄ | ⠅ | ⠇ | ⠍ | ⠝ | ⠕ | ⠏ | ⠟ | ⠗ | ⠎ | ⠞ | ⠌ | ⠜ |
| ⠤ | ⠥ | ⠧ | ⠭ | ⠽ | ⠵ | ⠯ | ⠿ | ⠷ | ⠮ | ⠾ | ⠬ | ⠼ |
| ⠠ | ⠡ | ⠣ | ⠩ | ⠹ | ⠱ | ⠫ | ⠻ | ⠳ | ⠪ | ⠺ | ⠨ | ⠸ |
| shift down | ⠂ | ⠆ | ⠒ | ⠲ | ⠢ | ⠖ | ⠶ | ⠦ | ⠔ | ⠴ | ⠐ | ⠰ |

The Braille pattern dots-6 ( ⠠ ) is a 6-dot braille cell with the bottom right dot raised, or an 8-dot braille cell with the lower-middle right dot raised. It is represented by the Unicode code point U+2820, and in Braille ASCII with a comma:, .

Character information
| Preview | ⠠ (braille pattern dots-6) | |
|---|---|---|
| Unicode name | BRAILLE PATTERN DOTS-6 | |
| Encodings | decimal | hex |
| Unicode | 10272 | U+2820 |
| UTF-8 | 226 160 160 | E2 A0 A0 |
| Numeric character reference | &#10272; | &#x2820; |
| Braille ASCII | 44 | 2C |

== Unified Braille ==
In unified international braille, the braille pattern dots-6 is used as a formatting, punctuation, accent sign, or otherwise as needed.

=== Table of unified braille values ===
| French Braille | Antoine number sign / mathematical sign, ieu |
| English Braille | Capital letter sign |
| German Braille | ' (apostrophe) |
| Bharati Braille | Visarga |
| IPA Braille | subscript sign |
| Slovak Braille | Capital letter sign |
| Arabic Braille | ـّ (shaddah) |
| Thai Braille | low tone consonant modifier |

== Other braille ==
| Japanese Braille | handakuten |
| Korean Braille | s- / ㅅ |
| Taiwanese Braille | 、 (comma) |
| Two-Cell Chinese Braille | emphasis mark |
| Nemeth Braille | , (comma), /. (decimal separator) |

== Plus dots 7 and 8 ==
Related to Braille pattern dots-6 are Braille patterns 67, 68, and 678, which are used in 8-dot braille systems, such as Gardner-Salinas and Luxembourgish Braille.

Character information
| Preview | ⡠ (braille pattern dots-67) | | ⢠ (braille pattern dots-68) | | ⣠ (braille pattern dots-678) | |
|---|---|---|---|---|---|---|
| Unicode name | BRAILLE PATTERN DOTS-67 | | BRAILLE PATTERN DOTS-68 | | BRAILLE PATTERN DOTS-678 | |
| Encodings | decimal | hex | dec | hex | dec | hex |
| Unicode | 10336 | U+2860 | 10400 | U+28A0 | 10464 | U+28E0 |
| UTF-8 | 226 161 160 | E2 A1 A0 | 226 162 160 | E2 A2 A0 | 226 163 160 | E2 A3 A0 |
| Numeric character reference | &#10336; | &#x2860; | &#10400; | &#x28A0; | &#10464; | &#x28E0; |

| | dots 67 | dots 68 | dots 678 |
|---|---|---|---|
| Gardner Salinas Braille | end array | | ~ (logical not) |

== Related 8-dot kantenji patterns ==
In the Japanese kantenji braille, the standard 8-dot Braille patterns 8, 18, 48, and 148 are the patterns related to Braille pattern dots-6, since the two additional dots of kantenji patterns 06, 67, and 067 are placed above the base 6-dot cell, instead of below, as in standard 8-dot braille.

Character information
| Preview | ⢀ (braille pattern dots-8) | | ⢁ (braille pattern dots-18) | | ⢈ (braille pattern dots-48) | | ⢉ (braille pattern dots-148) | |
|---|---|---|---|---|---|---|---|---|
| Unicode name | BRAILLE PATTERN DOTS-8 | | BRAILLE PATTERN DOTS-18 | | BRAILLE PATTERN DOTS-48 | | BRAILLE PATTERN DOTS-148 | |
| Encodings | decimal | hex | dec | hex | dec | hex | dec | hex |
| Unicode | 10368 | U+2880 | 10369 | U+2881 | 10376 | U+2888 | 10377 | U+2889 |
| UTF-8 | 226 162 128 | E2 A2 80 | 226 162 129 | E2 A2 81 | 226 162 136 | E2 A2 88 | 226 162 137 | E2 A2 89 |
| Numeric character reference | &#10368; | &#x2880; | &#10369; | &#x2881; | &#10376; | &#x2888; | &#10377; | &#x2889; |

=== Kantenji using braille patterns 8, 18, 48, or 148 ===
This listing includes kantenji using Braille pattern dots-6 for all 6349 kanji found in JIS C 6226-1978.

- - N/A - used only as a selector

==== Selector ====
- - な/亻 + selector 6 = 体
  - - な/亻 + な/亻 + selector 6 = 體
- - 仁/亻 + selector 6 = 像
- - も/門 + selector 6 = 凶
  - - も/門 + selector 6 + selector 6 = 凵
  - - 宿 + も/門 + selector 6 = 兇
  - - も/門 + も/門 + selector 6 = 匈
    - - に/氵 + も/門 + selector 6 = 洶
  - - 心 + も/門 + selector 6 = 椶
- - く/艹 + selector 6 = 卉
- - と/戸 + selector 6 = 尸
- - 日 + selector 6 = 曰
  - - に/氵 + 日 + selector 6 = 沓
- - き/木 + selector 6 = 本
  - - ち/竹 + き/木 + selector 6 = 笨
  - - み/耳 + き/木 + selector 6 = 躰
  - - 日 + き/木 + selector 6 = 皋
- - け/犬 + selector 6 = 猫
- - 囗 + selector 6 = 角
  - - れ/口 + 囗 + selector 6 = 嘴
  - - つ/土 + 囗 + selector 6 = 埆
  - - き/木 + 囗 + selector 6 = 桷
  - - 心 + 囗 + selector 6 = 槲
- - そ/馬 + selector 6 = 象
  - - そ/馬 + selector 6 + selector 6 = 豸
    - - そ/馬 + selector 6 + く/艹 = 貘
  - - 心 + そ/馬 + selector 6 = 橡
- - せ/食 + selector 6 = 酋
  - - 心 + せ/食 + selector 6 = 楢
  - - ひ/辶 + せ/食 + selector 6 = 遒
  - - せ/食 + せ/食 + selector 6 = 鰌
- - か/金 + selector 6 = 鉢
- - 心 + selector 6 = 黍
- - selector 6 + そ/馬 = 丑
  - - け/犬 + selector 6 + そ/馬 = 狃
  - - か/金 + selector 6 + そ/馬 = 鈕
  - - selector 6 + selector 6 + そ/馬 = 豕
- - selector 6 + に/氵 = 丞
  - - て/扌 + selector 6 + に/氵 = 拯
- - selector 6 + さ/阝 = 乍
  - - る/忄 + selector 6 + さ/阝 = 怎
- - selector 6 + て/扌 = 亭
  - - に/氵 + selector 6 + て/扌 = 渟
- - selector 6 + 囗 = 亶
- - selector 6 + り/分 = 僉
  - - ん/止 + selector 6 + り/分 = 歛
  - - ち/竹 + selector 6 + り/分 = 簽
- - selector 6 + 宿 = 兌
- - selector 6 + こ/子 = 公
  - - 心 + selector 6 + こ/子 = 枩
  - - か/金 + selector 6 + こ/子 = 瓮
  - - ふ/女 + selector 6 + こ/子 = 舩
  - - む/車 + selector 6 + こ/子 = 蚣
  - - お/頁 + selector 6 + こ/子 = 頌
- - selector 6 + 龸 = 几
  - - れ/口 + selector 6 + 龸 = 咒
- - selector 6 + み/耳 = 呂
  - - き/木 + selector 6 + み/耳 = 梠
  - - も/門 + selector 6 + み/耳 = 閭
    - - 心 + selector 6 + み/耳 = 櫚
  - - ち/竹 + selector 6 + み/耳 = 筥
  - - い/糹/#2 + selector 6 + み/耳 = 絽
- - selector 6 + け/犬 = 失
  - - な/亻 + selector 6 + け/犬 = 佚
  - - selector 6 + selector 6 + け/犬 = 夸
  - - し/巿 + selector 6 + け/犬 = 帙
  - - み/耳 + selector 6 + け/犬 = 跌
  - - む/車 + selector 6 + け/犬 = 軼
- - selector 6 + 心 = 奄
  - - に/氵 + selector 6 + 心 = 淹
  - - く/艹 + selector 6 + 心 = 菴
  - - も/門 + selector 6 + 心 = 閹
- - selector 6 + る/忄 = 婁
- - selector 6 + ⺼ = 孟
- - selector 6 + う/宀/#3 = 宛
  - - selector 6 + selector 6 + う/宀/#3 = 彑
- - selector 6 + は/辶 = 尚
  - - 氷/氵 + selector 6 + は/辶 = 敞
    - - よ/广 + selector 6 + は/辶 = 廠
  - - 心 + selector 6 + は/辶 = 棠
  - - に/氵 + selector 6 + は/辶 = 淌
  - - ね/示 + selector 6 + は/辶 = 裳
- - selector 6 + 仁/亻 = 尤
  - - ⺼ + selector 6 + 仁/亻 = 肬
  - - selector 6 + selector 6 + 仁/亻 = 无
- - selector 6 + つ/土 = 尭
  - - に/氵 + selector 6 + つ/土 = 澆
  - - く/艹 + selector 6 + つ/土 = 蕘
- - selector 6 + い/糹/#2 = 尹
  - - ち/竹 + selector 6 + い/糹/#2 = 笋
- - selector 6 + と/戸 = 廾
- - selector 6 + め/目 = 弗
- - と/戸 + selector 6 + め/目 = 髴
- - selector 6 + ゆ/彳 = 弯
  - - selector 6 + selector 6 + ゆ/彳 = 彎
- - selector 6 + ひ/辶 = 戍
  - - selector 6 + selector 6 + ひ/辶 = 柬
- - selector 6 + し/巿 = 曳
  - - い/糹/#2 + selector 6 + し/巿 = 絏
  - - selector 6 + selector 6 + し/巿 = 曵
- - selector 6 + 氷/氵 = 曷
- - selector 6 + ん/止 = 焉
  - - ふ/女 + selector 6 + ん/止 = 嫣
- - selector 6 + か/金 = 瓦
  - - の/禾 + selector 6 + か/金 = 甃
  - - も/門 + selector 6 + か/金 = 甌
  - - う/宀/#3 + selector 6 + か/金 = 甍
  - - そ/馬 + selector 6 + か/金 = 甑
  - - ま/石 + selector 6 + か/金 = 甓
  - - ひ/辶 + selector 6 + か/金 = 甕
- - selector 6 + ほ/方 = 甫
  - - ⺼ + selector 6 + ほ/方 = 脯
  - - ひ/辶 + selector 6 + ほ/方 = 逋
  - - せ/食 + selector 6 + ほ/方 = 鯆
- - selector 6 + よ/广 = 疋
- - selector 6 + む/車 = 矣
  - - な/亻 + selector 6 + む/車 = 俟
  - - ん/止 + selector 6 + む/車 = 欸
  - - ま/石 + selector 6 + む/車 = 竢
- - selector 6 + な/亻 = 竟
- - selector 6 + の/禾 = 而
  - - の/禾 + selector 6 + の/禾 = 粫
- - selector 6 + ら/月 = 胡
  - - 心 + selector 6 + ら/月 = 楜
  - - む/車 + selector 6 + ら/月 = 蝴
  - - せ/食 + selector 6 + ら/月 = 餬
- - selector 6 + ぬ/力 = 臼
  - - け/犬 + selector 6 + ぬ/力 = 舂
- - selector 6 + も/門 = 芻
  - - く/艹 + selector 6 + も/門 = 蒭
- - selector 6 + く/艹 = 莫
  - - の/禾 + selector 6 + く/艹 = 糢
  - - む/車 + selector 6 + く/艹 = 蟆
  - - selector 6 + selector 6 + く/艹 = 屮
- - selector 6 + え/訁 = 袁
- - selector 6 + ま/石 = 辟
  - - ふ/女 + selector 6 + ま/石 = 嬖
  - - く/艹 + selector 6 + ま/石 = 薜
  - - 心 + selector 6 + ま/石 = 蘗
  - - み/耳 + selector 6 + ま/石 = 躄
- - selector 6 + ち/竹 = 采
- - selector 6 + selector 6 + ち/竹 = 釆
- - selector 6 + れ/口 = 鬲
- - selector 6 + selector 6 + す/発 = 乕
- - selector 6 + selector 6 + や/疒 = 鬯
- - selector 6 + selector 4 + ね/示 = 劒
- - む/車 + selector 6 + ろ/十 = 蝨
