= Japanese Braille =

Braille script of the Japanese language

Japanese Braille ⠇⠮⠴⠐⠪⠎⠀⠟⠴⠐⠳
- Script type: Abugida
- Print basis: Kana
- Languages: Japanese

Related scripts
- Parent systems: Night writing: Braille; Japanese Braille
- Child systems: Two-Cell Chinese Braille (in conception) kantenji

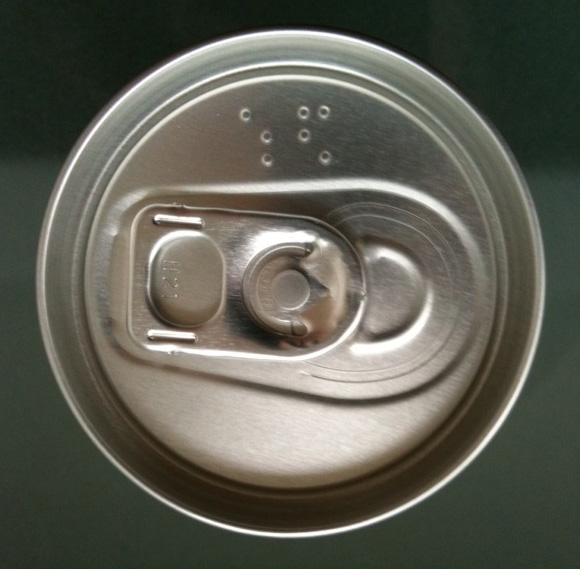
Japanese Braille on a can of Asahi Super Dry beer, written "sake"

Japanese Braille is the braille script of the Japanese language. It is based on the original braille script, though the connection is tenuous. In Japanese it is known as tenji (点字), literally "dot characters". It transcribes Japanese more or less as it would be written in the hiragana or katakana syllabaries, without any provision for writing kanji.

Japanese Braille is a vowel-based abugida. That is, the glyphs are syllabic, but unlike kana they contain separate symbols for consonant and vowel, and the vowel takes primacy. The vowels are written in the upper left corner (dots 1, 2, 4) and may be used alone. The consonants are written in the lower right corner (dots 3, 5, 6) and cannot occur alone. However, the semivowel y is indicated by dot 4, one of the vowel dots, and the vowel combination is dropped to the bottom of the cell. When this dot is written in isolation, it indicates that the following syllable has a medial y, as in mya. Syllables beginning with w are indicated by dropping the vowel dots to the bottom of the cell without additional consonant dots.

== Braille for kana ==
In Japanese Braille, bare vowels are assigned to braille patterns that occupy the upper-left half of the cell (dots 1–2–4): ⠁⠃⠉⠋⠊. While the first three vowels are the same as the numerals 1, 2, and 3, this pattern does not continue, and the cells representing other kana have no apparent connection to international values or numerical order. Common punctuation marks tend to follow standard international values, with several doing double-duty with the w- series of kana braille. Beyond the bare vowels, all other kana use the vowel series, called dan, with each gyō (consonant series) represented either by adding specific dots, lowering the dot positions of the dan vowel patterns within the cell, or both.

	あ段 a dan	い段 i dan	う段 u dan	え段 e dan	お段 o dan	
あ行 a gyō bare vowels	あ a	い i	う u	え e	お o	
あ行 a gyō bare vowels	⠁ (braille pattern dots-1)	⠃ (braille pattern dots-12)	⠉ (braille pattern dots-14)	⠋ (braille pattern dots-124)	⠊ (braille pattern dots-24)	
あ行 a gyō bare vowels	⠁	⠃	⠉	⠋	⠊	
か行 ka gyō: k- dan + dot 6	か ka	き ki	く ku	け ke	こ ko	
か行 ka gyō: k- dan + dot 6	⠡ (braille pattern dots-16)	⠣ (braille pattern dots-126)	⠩ (braille pattern dots-146)	⠫ (braille pattern dots-1246)	⠪ (braille pattern dots-246)	
か行 ka gyō: k- dan + dot 6	⠡	⠣	⠩	⠫	⠪	
さ行 sa gyō: s- dan + dots 5&6	さ sa	し shi	す su	せ se	そ so	
さ行 sa gyō: s- dan + dots 5&6	⠱ (braille pattern dots-156)	⠳ (braille pattern dots-1256)	⠹ (braille pattern dots-1456)	⠻ (braille pattern dots-12456)	⠺ (braille pattern dots-2456)	
さ行 sa gyō: s- dan + dots 5&6	⠱	⠳	⠹	⠻	⠺	
た行 ta gyō: t- dan + dots 3&5	た ta	ち chi	つ tsu	て te	と to	
た行 ta gyō: t- dan + dots 3&5	⠕ (braille pattern dots-135)	⠗ (braille pattern dots-1235)	⠝ (braille pattern dots-1345)	⠟ (braille pattern dots-12345)	⠞ (braille pattern dots-2345)	
た行 ta gyō: t- dan + dots 3&5	⠕	⠗	⠝	⠟	⠞	
な行 na gyō: n- dan + dot 3	な na	に ni	ぬ nu	ね ne	の no	
な行 na gyō: n- dan + dot 3	⠅ (braille pattern dots-13)	⠇ (braille pattern dots-123)	⠍ (braille pattern dots-134)	⠏ (braille pattern dots-1234)	⠎ (braille pattern dots-234)	
な行 na gyō: n- dan + dot 3	⠅	⠇	⠍	⠏	⠎	
は行 ha gyō: h- dan + dots 3&6	は ha	ひ hi	ふ fu	へ he	ほ ho	
は行 ha gyō: h- dan + dots 3&6	⠥ (braille pattern dots-136)	⠧ (braille pattern dots-1236)	⠭ (braille pattern dots-1346)	⠯ (braille pattern dots-12346)	⠮ (braille pattern dots-2346)	
は行 ha gyō: h- dan + dots 3&6	⠥	⠧	⠭	⠯	⠮	
ま行 ma gyō: m- dan + dots 3,5&6	ま ma	み mi	む mu	め me	も mo	ん n
ま行 ma gyō: m- dan + dots 3,5&6	⠵ (braille pattern dots-1356)	⠷ (braille pattern dots-12356)	⠽ (braille pattern dots-13456)	⠿ (braille pattern dots-123456)	⠾ (braille pattern dots-23456)	⠴ (braille pattern dots-356)
ま行 ma gyō: m- dan + dots 3,5&6	⠵	⠷	⠽	⠿	⠾	⠴
や行 ya gyō: y- dan lowered + dot 4	や ya		ゆ yu		よ yo	-y-
や行 ya gyō: y- dan lowered + dot 4	⠌ (braille pattern dots-34)		⠬ (braille pattern dots-346)		⠜ (braille pattern dots-345)	⠈ (braille pattern dots-4)
や行 ya gyō: y- dan lowered + dot 4	⠌		⠬		⠜	⠈
ら行 ra gyō: r- dan + dot 5	ら ra	り ri	る ru	れ re	ろ ro	
ら行 ra gyō: r- dan + dot 5	⠑ (braille pattern dots-15)	⠓ (braille pattern dots-125)	⠙ (braille pattern dots-145)	⠛ (braille pattern dots-1245)	⠚ (braille pattern dots-245)	
ら行 ra gyō: r- dan + dot 5	⠑	⠓	⠙	⠛	⠚	
わ行 wa gyō: w- dan lowered	わ wa	ゐ wi		ゑ we	を wo	-w-
わ行 wa gyō: w- dan lowered	⠄ (braille pattern dots-3)	⠆ (braille pattern dots-23)		⠖ (braille pattern dots-235)	⠔ (braille pattern dots-35)	⠢ (braille pattern dots-26)
わ行 wa gyō: w- dan lowered	⠄	⠆		⠖	⠔	⠢

The patterns for adding yōon to a mora can be added to the modifiers for dakuten and handakuten as a compound kana modifier, and the ya gyō braille series is based on the yōon dot pattern. The symbol for ん syllabic "n" is based on its historical derivation from む mu.

== Other symbols ==
In kana, a small tsu (っ), called sokuon, is used to indicate that the following consonant is geminate, and in interjections as a glottal stop. In katakana only, a long vowel is indicated with a horizontal stroke (ー) called a chōon. This also looks like a half dash in braille:

sokuon	chōon
⠂ (braille pattern dots-2)	⠒ (braille pattern dots-25)
⠂	⠒

The placement of these blocks mirrors the equivalent kana: the sokuon indicates that the following consonant is geminate, whereas the chōon indicates that the preceding vowel is long.

In kana, the voiced consonants g, z, d, b are derived from the voiceless consonants k, s, t, h by adding a diacritic called dakuten to the kana, as in ぎ gi; in foreign words, vu is written by adding this to the vowel u. Similarly, p is derived from h by adding a small circle, handakuten. Two kana are fused into a single syllable by writing the second small, as in きゃ kya from ki + ya; this is called yōon.

In Japanese Braille, the signs for these are prefixes. That is, the order is dakuten + ki for ぎ gi. When more than one occurs in a single syllable, they are combined in a single prefix block, as the yōon-dakuten used for ぎゃ gya.

dakuten (voicing)	handakuten (p-)	yōon (-y-)	yōon + dakuten	yōon + handakuten
⠐ (braille pattern dots-5)	⠠ (braille pattern dots-6)	⠈ (braille pattern dots-4)	⠘ (braille pattern dots-45)	⠨ (braille pattern dots-46)
⠐	⠠	⠈	⠘	⠨

The yōon prefix uses the dot that represents y in the blocks ya, yu, yo. When placed before ka, ku, ko, it produces kya, kyu, kyo. Likewise, the yōon-dakuten prefix before ka, ku, ko creates gya, gyu, gyo. And so on for the other consonants.

The yōon prefix can also be used with the kana from the e row to represent the -ye in foreign borrowings: that is, kye, she, che, nye, hye, mye, rye, voiced gye, je, bye, and plosive pye are written with the yōon prefixes plus ke, se, te, ne, he, me, re. The syllable ye is written yōon plus e.

There is also a prefix for medial -w- called gōyōon. When combined with ka, it produces the obsolete syllable kwa. It may also be fused with the voicing prefix for gwa. For foreign borrowings, this extends to kwi, kwe, kwo and gwa, gwi, gwe, gwo. Gōyōon may also be combined with the vowels i, e, o for foreign wi, we, wo (now that the w in the original Japanese kana for wi, we, wo is silent); with ha, hi, he, ho for fa, fi, fe, fo and (when voiced) for va, vi, ve, vo; and with ta, chi, te, to for tsa, tsi, tse, tso. These two prefixes are identical to the question mark and full stop.

gōyōon (-w-)	gōyōon + dakuten
⠢ (braille pattern dots-26)	⠲ (braille pattern dots-256)
⠢	⠲

These all parallel usage in kana. However, there are additional conventions which are unique to braille. Yōon and yōon-dakuten are also added to chi and shi to write ti, di and si, zi found in foreign borrowings; similarly gōyōon and gōyōon-dakuten are added to tsu to write tu, du. This differs from the system used in kana, where the base syllables are te and to respectively, and a subscript vowel i or u is added.

In an assignment that is counter-intuitive in kana, yōon + handakuten is prefixed to tsu, yu, yo to produce tyu, fyu, fyo in foreign words, and voiced for dyu, vyu, vyo. The latter—yōon + dakuten + handakuten, is impossible in kana:

yōon +
dakuten +
handakuten
⠸

== Orthography ==
Japanese Braille is written as print Japanese would be written in kana. However, there are three discrepancies:

- In print, the ubiquitous grammatical particles wa and e have the historical spellings は ha and へ he. In braille, they are written as they are pronounced, ⠄ wa and ⠋ e.
- The long ō sound is written with ⠒ (chōon), as it would be romanized, regardless of whether it is oo or ou in print Japanese. Long ū is also written with a chōon rather than a u. (This is a common convention in katakana, but does not occur in hiragana.) Thus Tōkyō, sorted as Toukyou in dictionaries, is nonetheless written ⠞⠒⠈⠪⠒, and sansū is written ⠱⠴⠹⠒.
- Spaces are used to separate words (though not clauses or sentences, where punctuation performs that function). Thus 今日は朝からよく晴れている。 is spaced as in its romanization, though without separating particles from their nouns: Kyōwa asakara yoku harete iru. ⠈⠪⠒⠄⠀⠁⠱⠡⠑⠀⠜⠩⠀⠥⠛⠟⠀⠃⠙⠲ Spaces are also placed between family and personal names, as in 石川倉次 Ishikawa Kuraji. When writing in katakana, an interpunct ⟨・⟩ is used for this function in print, as in ルイ・ブライユ Rui Buraiyu (Louis Braille).

== Punctuation ==
Besides the punctuation of Japanese, braille also has symbols to indicate that the following characters are digits or the Latin alphabet.

。	、	？	！	「 ... 」	（ ... ）	hyphen	—	・・・	space
⠲ (braille pattern dots-256)	⠰ (braille pattern dots-56)	⠢ (braille pattern dots-26)	⠖ (braille pattern dots-235)	...	...	⠤ (braille pattern dots-36)	⠒ (braille pattern dots-25)	⠂ (braille pattern dots-2)	⠀ (braille pattern blank)
⠲	⠰	⠢	⠖	⠤⠀⠤	⠶⠀⠶	⠤	⠒⠒	⠂⠂⠂	⠀

As noted above, the space is used between words and also where an interpunct would be used when names are written in katakana. There are several additional punctuation marks.

== Formatting ==
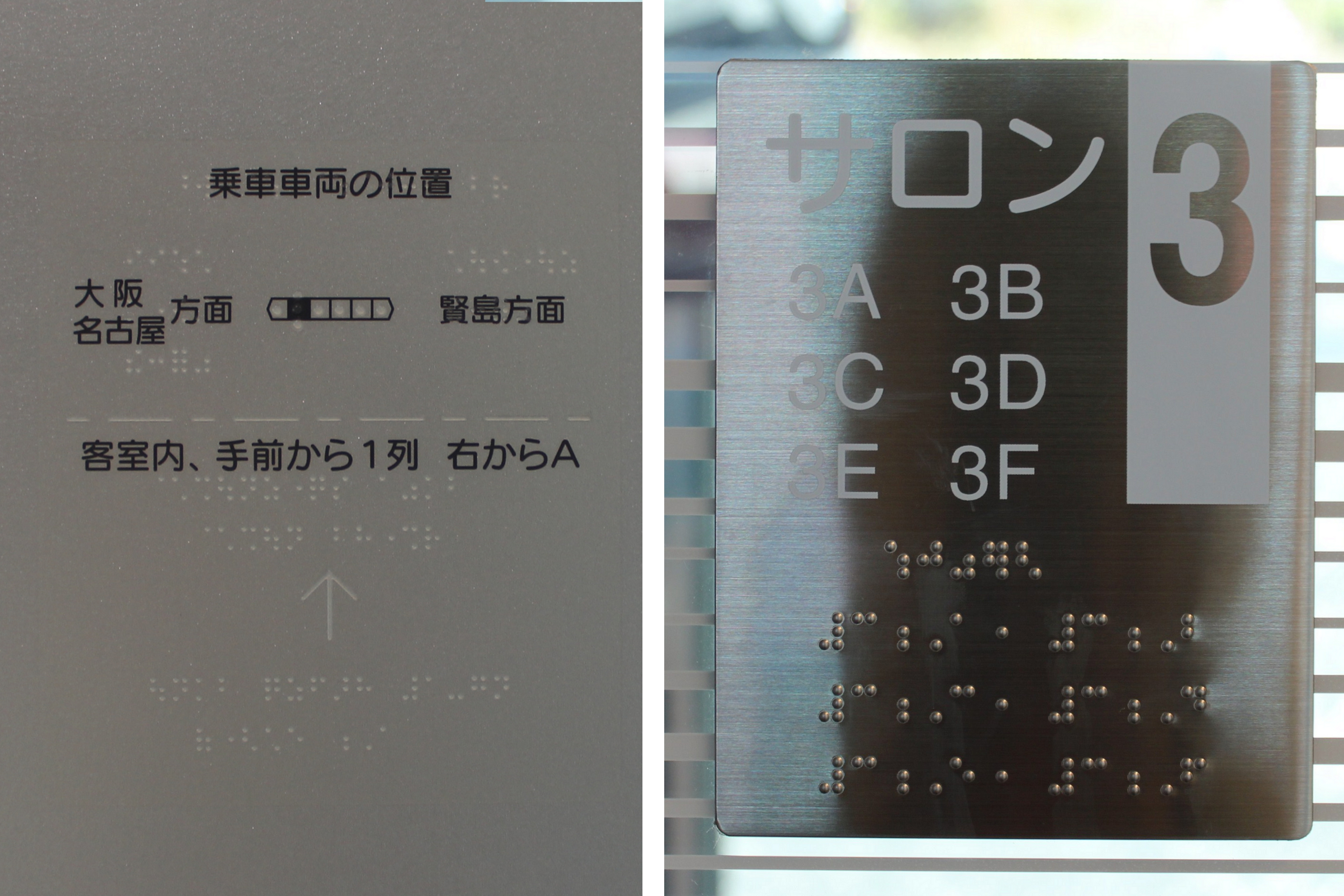
At left, Japanese print and braille text. The embossed text includes non-braille lines, bullets, and an arrow. At right, an illustration of Western digits and letters.

Western letters and digits are indicated as follows:

Digit(s)	Latin letter(s)	capital letter
⠼ (braille pattern dots-3456)	⠰ (braille pattern dots-56)	⠠ (braille pattern dots-6)
⠼	⠰	⠠

An additional sign indicates that the following characters are specifically English words and not just in the Latin alphabet.

Words immediately follow numbers, unless they begin with a vowel or with r-. Because the syllables a i u e o and ra ri ru re ro are homographic with the digits 0–9, a hyphen is inserted to separate them. Thus 6人 "six people" (6 nin) is written without a hyphen, ⠼⠋⠇⠴ ⟨6nin⟩, but 6円 "six yen" (6 en) is written with a hyphen, ⠼⠋⠤⠋⠴ ⟨6-en⟩, because ⠼⠋⠋⠴ would be read as ⟨66n⟩.

== Kanji ==
There are both a six dot system, tenkanji, the significantly more common writing system which phonetically transcribes kanji, and an eight-dot extension of Japanese Braille, kantenji, which is less commonly used and aims to preserve the meaning of Japanese kanji by depicting the radicals. Tenkanji is also more similar to how Chinese Brailles are transcribed.
