= Braille pattern dots-126 =

Braille pattern

6-dot braille cells
⠀	⠁	⠃	⠉	⠙	⠑	⠋	⠛	⠓	⠊	⠚	⠈	⠘
⠄	⠅	⠇	⠍	⠝	⠕	⠏	⠟	⠗	⠎	⠞	⠌	⠜
⠤	⠥	⠧	⠭	⠽	⠵	⠯	⠿	⠷	⠮	⠾	⠬	⠼
⠠	⠡	⠣	⠩	⠹	⠱	⠫	⠻	⠳	⠪	⠺	⠨	⠸
shift down	⠂	⠆	⠒	⠲	⠢	⠖	⠶	⠦	⠔	⠴	⠐	⠰

The Braille pattern dots-126 ( ⠣ ) is a 6-dot braille cell with the top and middle left, and bottom right dots raised, or an 8-dot braille cell with the top and upper-middle left, and lower-middle right dots raised. It is represented by the Unicode code point U+2823, and in Braille ASCII with the less than sign: <.

Character information
Preview	⠣ (braille pattern dots-126)	
Unicode name	BRAILLE PATTERN DOTS-126	
Encodings	decimal	hex
Unicode	10275	U+2823
UTF-8	226 160 163	E2 A0 A3
Numeric character reference	&#10275;	&#x2823;
Braille ASCII	60	3C

== Unified Braille ==
In unified international braille, the braille pattern dots-126 is used to represent a voiced dorsal fricative or aspirate, such as /ɣ/, /ʁ/, or /gʱ/, or otherwise as needed.

=== Table of unified Braille values ===
French Braille	Ê, mathematical 2, fl,ent, "même"
English Braille	gh
German Braille	eu
Bharati Braille	घ / ਘ / ઘ / ঘ / ଘ / ఘ / ಘ / ഘ / ඝ / گھ
Icelandic Braille	Í
IPA Braille	/ɔ/
Arabic Braille	غ
Persian Braille	غ
Irish Braille	gh
Thai Braille	แ◌ ae
Luxembourgish Braille	2 (two)

== Other Braille ==
Japanese Braille	ki / き / キ
Korean Braille	a / ㅏ
Mainland Chinese Braille	yin, -in
Taiwanese Braille	o / ㄛ
Two-Cell Chinese Braille	hu- -í/-ú/-ǘ, 时 shí
Nemeth Braille	radical index (nth root) sign, directly over indicator
Gardner Salinas Braille	2
Algerian Braille	ـّ (shaddah)

== Plus dots 7 and 8 ==
Related to Braille pattern dots-126 are Braille patterns 1267, 1268, and 12678, which are used in 8-dot braille systems, such as Gardner-Salinas and Luxembourgish Braille.

Character information
Preview	⡣ (braille pattern dots-1267)		⢣ (braille pattern dots-1268)		⣣ (braille pattern dots-12678)	
Unicode name	BRAILLE PATTERN DOTS-1267		BRAILLE PATTERN DOTS-1268		BRAILLE PATTERN DOTS-12678	
Encodings	decimal	hex	dec	hex	dec	hex
Unicode	10339	U+2863	10403	U+28A3	10467	U+28E3
UTF-8	226 161 163	E2 A1 A3	226 162 163	E2 A2 A3	226 163 163	E2 A3 A3
Numeric character reference	&#10339;	&#x2863;	&#10403;	&#x28A3;	&#10467;	&#x28E3;

	dots 1267	dots 1268	dots 12678
Gardner Salinas Braille			

== Related 8-dot kantenji patterns ==
In the Japanese kantenji braille, the standard 8-dot Braille patterns 238, 1238, 2348, and 12348 are the patterns related to Braille pattern dots-126, since the two additional dots of kantenji patterns 0126, 1267, and 01267 are placed above the base 6-dot cell, instead of below, as in standard 8-dot braille.

Character information
Preview	⢆ (braille pattern dots-238)		⢇ (braille pattern dots-1238)		⢎ (braille pattern dots-2348)		⢏ (braille pattern dots-12348)	
Unicode name	BRAILLE PATTERN DOTS-238		BRAILLE PATTERN DOTS-1238		BRAILLE PATTERN DOTS-2348		BRAILLE PATTERN DOTS-12348	
Encodings	decimal	hex	dec	hex	dec	hex	dec	hex
Unicode	10374	U+2886	10375	U+2887	10382	U+288E	10383	U+288F
UTF-8	226 162 134	E2 A2 86	226 162 135	E2 A2 87	226 162 142	E2 A2 8E	226 162 143	E2 A2 8F
Numeric character reference	&#10374;	&#x2886;	&#10375;	&#x2887;	&#10382;	&#x288E;	&#10383;	&#x288F;

=== Kantenji using braille patterns 238, 1238, 2348, or 12348 ===
This listing includes kantenji using Braille pattern dots-126 for all 6349 kanji found in JIS C 6226-1978.

- - 木

==== Variants and thematic compounds ====
- - selector 1 + き/木 = 甚
- - selector 2 + き/木 = 巳
- - selector 3 + き/木 = 已
- - selector 4 + き/木 = 其
- - き/木 + selector 4 = 未
- - き/木 + selector 5 = 末
- - き/木 + selector 6 = 本
- - 比 + き/木 = 北
- - 数 + き/木 = 己

==== Compounds of 木 ====
- - な/亻 + き/木 = 休
  - - る/忄 + な/亻 + き/木 = 恷
  - - 火 + な/亻 + き/木 = 烋
  - - そ/馬 + な/亻 + き/木 = 貅
  - - せ/食 + な/亻 + き/木 = 鮴
- - 囗 + き/木 = 困
  - - る/忄 + 囗 + き/木 = 悃
  - - き/木 + 囗 + き/木 = 梱
- - 宿 + き/木 = 宋
- - か/金 + き/木 = 巣
  - - ね/示 + か/金 + き/木 = 剿
  - - ぬ/力 + か/金 + き/木 = 勦
  - - き/木 + か/金 + き/木 = 樔
- - よ/广 + き/木 = 床
- - て/扌 + き/木 = 控
- - ろ/十 + き/木 = 材
- - す/発 + き/木 = 条
  - - す/発 + す/発 + き/木 = 條
    - - に/氵 + す/発 + き/木 = 滌
    - - 心 + す/発 + き/木 = 篠
- - き/木 + き/木 = 林
  - - 火 + き/木 = 焚
  - - つ/土 + き/木 + き/木 = 埜
  - - ふ/女 + き/木 + き/木 = 婪
  - - て/扌 + き/木 + き/木 = 攀
  - - ほ/方 + き/木 + き/木 = 梦
  - - 心 + き/木 + き/木 = 楚
    - - ま/石 + き/木 = 礎
  - - け/犬 + き/木 + き/木 = 樊
  - - に/氵 + き/木 + き/木 = 淋
  - - へ/⺩ + き/木 + き/木 = 琳
  - - や/疒 + き/木 + き/木 = 痳
  - - ま/石 + き/木 + き/木 = 礬
  - - す/発 + き/木 + き/木 = 罧
  - - せ/食 + き/木 + き/木 = 醂
  - - ち/竹 + き/木 + き/木 = 霖
- - た/⽥ + き/木 = 果
  - - く/艹 + き/木 = 菓
  - - ね/示 + き/木 = 裸
  - - ね/示 + た/⽥ + き/木 = 裹
  - - み/耳 + た/⽥ + き/木 = 踝
  - - お/頁 + た/⽥ + き/木 = 顆
- - れ/口 + き/木 = 架
- - る/忄 + き/木 = 某
  - - 心 + る/忄 + き/木 = 楳
- - 氷/氵 + き/木 = 染
- - 龸 + き/木 = 栄
  - - 龸 + 龸 + き/木 = 榮
    - - む/車 + 龸 + き/木 = 蠑
- - み/耳 + き/木 = 栽
- - ゆ/彳 + き/木 = 桁
- - ふ/女 + き/木 = 案
- - め/目 + き/木 = 植
- - に/氵 + き/木 = 漆
- - 心 + き/木 = 茶
- - も/門 + き/木 = 閑
  - - ふ/女 + も/門 + き/木 = 嫻
- - き/木 + を/貝 = 札
  - - い/糹/#2 + き/木 + を/貝 = 紮
- - き/木 + 龸 = 机
- - き/木 + も/門 = 朽
- - き/木 + し/巿 = 村
- - き/木 + 火 = 杖
- - き/木 + 数 = 束
  - - selector 1 + き/木 + 数 = 朿
    - - き/木 + き/木 + 数 = 棗
    - - 心 + き/木 + 数 = 棘
  - - き/木 + ぬ/力 = 刺
    - - selector 1 + き/木 + ぬ/力 = 剌
      - - れ/口 + き/木 + ぬ/力 = 喇
      - - に/氵 + き/木 + ぬ/力 = 溂
  - - る/忄 + き/木 + 数 = 悚
  - - ま/石 + き/木 + 数 = 竦
  - - み/耳 + き/木 + 数 = 踈
- - き/木 + 宿 = 杭
- - き/木 + ふ/女 = 杯
- - き/木 + ん/止 = 板
- - き/木 + お/頁 = 析
  - - に/氵 + き/木 + お/頁 = 淅
  - - 日 + き/木 + お/頁 = 皙
  - - む/車 + き/木 + お/頁 = 蜥
- - き/木 + み/耳 = 枕
- - き/木 + 氷/氵 = 枚
- - き/木 + は/辶 = 枝
- - き/木 + す/発 = 枢
  - - き/木 + き/木 + す/発 = 樞
  - - き/木 + す/発 + selector 4 = 柩
- - き/木 + ろ/十 = 枯
- - き/木 + え/訁 = 柄
- - き/木 + よ/广 = 柔
  - - て/扌 + き/木 + よ/广 = 揉
  - - の/禾 + き/木 + よ/广 = 糅
  - - み/耳 + き/木 + よ/广 = 蹂
  - - と/戸 + き/木 + よ/广 = 鞣
- - き/木 + へ/⺩ = 柱
  - - き/木 + へ/⺩ + selector 1 = 枉
  - - き/木 + へ/⺩ + し/巿 = 梼
- - き/木 + 比 = 柴
- - き/木 + 日 = 査
  - - に/氵 + き/木 + 日 = 渣
- - き/木 + ち/竹 = 校
- - き/木 + か/金 = 株
- - き/木 + ゐ/幺 = 核
- - き/木 + や/疒 = 根
- - き/木 + れ/口 = 格
- - き/木 + と/戸 = 械
- - き/木 + ほ/方 = 棒
- - き/木 + ⺼ = 棚
- - き/木 + う/宀/#3 = 森
- - き/木 + さ/阝 = 棲
- - き/木 + ら/月 = 棺
- - き/木 + り/分 = 検
  - - き/木 + き/木 + り/分 = 檢
- - き/木 + ま/石 = 極
- - き/木 + た/⽥ = 楼
  - - き/木 + き/木 + た/⽥ = 樓
- - き/木 + 仁/亻 = 概
- - き/木 + む/車 = 構
- - き/木 + ひ/辶 = 槌
- - き/木 + そ/馬 = 様
  - - き/木 + き/木 + そ/馬 = 樣
- - き/木 + に/氵 = 標
- - き/木 + く/艹 = 模
- - き/木 + け/犬 = 権
  - - き/木 + き/木 + け/犬 = 權
- - き/木 + こ/子 = 横
- - き/木 + ゆ/彳 = 樹
- - き/木 + の/禾 = 橋
- - き/木 + 囗 = 機
- - き/木 + め/目 = 相
  - - ち/竹 + き/木 = 霜
    - - ふ/女 + ち/竹 + き/木 = 孀
  - - き/木 + 心 = 想
  - - よ/广 + き/木 + め/目 = 廂
  - - に/氵 + き/木 + め/目 = 湘
- - き/木 + ね/示 = 禁
  - - れ/口 + き/木 + ね/示 = 噤
  - - ね/示 + き/木 + ね/示 = 襟
- - き/木 + い/糹/#2 = 集
  - - ね/示 + き/木 + い/糹/#2 = 襍
- - 心 + き/木 + う/宀/#3 = 杜
- - き/木 + む/車 + 宿 = 凩
- - れ/口 + 宿 + き/木 = 呆
- - う/宀/#3 + 宿 + き/木 = 寨
- - き/木 + 心 + う/宀/#3 = 彬
- - き/木 + 宿 + と/戸 = 朴
- - き/木 + selector 1 + ゐ/幺 = 朶
- - き/木 + selector 4 + ぬ/力 = 朷
- - き/木 + う/宀/#3 + ぬ/力 = 朸
- - き/木 + 比 + な/亻 = 杁
- - き/木 + 宿 + か/金 = 杆
- - き/木 + 比 + も/門 = 杓
- - き/木 + 龸 + 囗 = 杙
- - き/木 + 宿 + こ/子 = 杠
- - き/木 + こ/子 + selector 1 = 杢
- - き/木 + や/疒 + selector 1 = 杣
- - き/木 + ほ/方 + そ/馬 = 杪
- - き/木 + 火 + selector 1 = 杰
- - 日 + 宿 + き/木 = 杲
- - き/木 + 龸 + 日 = 杳
- - き/木 + そ/馬 + selector 4 = 杵
- - き/木 + selector 4 + よ/广 = 杼
- - き/木 + selector 3 + ね/示 = 枅
- - き/木 + 宿 + ろ/十 = 枠
- - き/木 + 比 + く/艹 = 枡
- - き/木 + 龸 + と/戸 = 枦
- - き/木 + 龸 + ぬ/力 = 枴
- - き/木 + ぬ/力 + れ/口 = 枷
- - き/木 + も/門 + selector 2 = 枹
- - き/木 + 宿 + ひ/辶 = 柁
- - き/木 + 龸 + ま/石 = 柆
- - き/木 + な/亻 + し/巿 = 柎
- - き/木 + 龸 + を/貝 = 柝
- - き/木 + よ/广 + ん/止 = 柢
- - き/木 + selector 5 + そ/馬 = 柤
- - き/木 + 心 + つ/土 = 柧
- - き/木 + 比 + へ/⺩ = 柮
- - き/木 + 比 + か/金 = 柯
- - き/木 + 宿 + へ/⺩ = 柵
- - き/木 + り/分 + へ/⺩ = 栓
- - き/木 + 比 + に/氵 = 栖
- - き/木 + selector 4 + か/金 = 栞
- - き/木 + ろ/十 + こ/子 = 栫
- - き/木 + と/戸 + selector 5 = 栲
- - き/木 + 宿 + け/犬 = 桀
- - き/木 + 宿 + も/門 = 框
- - き/木 + 龸 + け/犬 = 桍
- - き/木 + selector 4 + ゆ/彳 = 桎
- - き/木 + selector 5 + 日 = 桓
- - き/木 + つ/土 + れ/口 = 桔
- - き/木 + selector 5 + む/車 = 桙
- - き/木 + selector 5 + い/糹/#2 = 桝
- - き/木 + 宿 + 囗 = 桟
- - き/木 + 龸 + ふ/女 = 档
- - き/木 + selector 2 + う/宀/#3 = 桴
- - き/木 + 宿 + つ/土 = 桶
- - き/木 + 囗 + selector 6 = 桷
- - き/木 + う/宀/#3 + か/金 = 桿
- - き/木 + 宿 + に/氵 = 梁
- - き/木 + は/辶 + へ/⺩ = 梃
- - き/木 + 龸 + や/疒 = 梍
- - き/木 + こ/子 + く/艹 = 梏
- - き/木 + 宿 + せ/食 = 梟
- - き/木 + selector 6 + み/耳 = 梠
- - き/木 + そ/馬 + ⺼ = 梢
- - き/木 + 宿 + む/車 = 梭
- - き/木 + ゆ/彳 + 宿 = 梯
- - き/木 + 宿 + く/艹 = 梳
- - き/木 + selector 4 + 龸 = 梵
- - き/木 + と/戸 + せ/食 = 梶
- - き/木 + く/艹 + り/分 = 梹
- - き/木 + 比 + 龸 = 梺
- - き/木 + 宿 + る/忄 = 棆
- - き/木 + 龸 + き/木 = 棊
- - き/木 + 宿 + き/木 = 棋
- - き/木 + 日 + 比 = 棍
- - き/木 + 日 + ん/止 = 棔
- - き/木 + 比 + ひ/辶 = 棟
- - き/木 + 囗 + ゆ/彳 = 棡
- - き/木 + selector 4 + 囗 = 棧
- - き/木 + り/分 + 心 = 棯
- - き/木 + 日 + と/戸 = 棹
- - き/木 + 宿 + う/宀/#3 = 椀
- - き/木 + 龸 + こ/子 = 椁
- - き/木 + ふ/女 + ま/石 = 椄
- - き/木 + り/分 + 日 = 椙
- - き/木 + く/艹 + 比 = 椛
- - き/木 + ゆ/彳 + ぬ/力 = 椡
- - き/木 + 囗 + へ/⺩ = 椢
- - き/木 + た/⽥ + り/分 = 椣
- - き/木 + や/疒 + れ/口 = 椥
- - き/木 + け/犬 + ぬ/力 = 椦
- - き/木 + よ/广 + し/巿 = 椨
- - き/木 + ま/石 + ま/石 = 椪
- - き/木 + selector 4 + の/禾 = 椴
- - き/木 + 龸 + そ/馬 = 椽
- - き/木 + ぬ/力 + け/犬 = 楔
- - き/木 + 宿 + ら/月 = 楕
- - き/木 + 数 + る/忄 = 楞
- - き/木 + 宿 + よ/广 = 楪
- - き/木 + れ/口 + み/耳 = 楫
- - き/木 + よ/广 + め/目 = 楯
- - き/木 + 比 + 日 = 楷
- - き/木 + 宿 + ⺼ = 楹
- - き/木 + 日 + 氷/氵 = 楾
- - き/木 + う/宀/#3 + た/⽥ = 榕
- - き/木 + 宿 + ほ/方 = 榜
- - き/木 + 宿 + ね/示 = 榱
- - き/木 + む/車 + selector 2 = 榻
- - き/木 + 比 + え/訁 = 槁
- - き/木 + ふ/女 + の/禾 = 槃
- - き/木 + ら/月 + は/辶 = 槊
- - き/木 + り/分 + お/頁 = 槍
- - き/木 + そ/馬 + こ/子 = 槎
- - き/木 + を/貝 + こ/子 = 槓
- - き/木 + せ/食 + や/疒 = 槝
- - き/木 + ま/石 + 心 = 槞
- - き/木 + む/車 + を/貝 = 槧
- - き/木 + さ/阝 + こ/子 = 槨
- - き/木 + selector 4 + て/扌 = 槫
- - き/木 + 日 + selector 1 = 槹
- - き/木 + selector 1 + そ/馬 = 槽
- - 心 + 宿 + き/木 = 槿
- - き/木 + は/辶 + つ/土 = 樋
- - き/木 + 比 + つ/土 = 樌
- - き/木 + 龸 + む/車 = 樛
- - き/木 + せ/食 + selector 1 = 樢
- - き/木 + 宿 + 火 = 樮
- - き/木 + い/糹/#2 + 火 = 樵
- - き/木 + 日 + ゑ/訁 = 樶
- - き/木 + 宿 + な/亻 = 樸
- - き/木 + 宿 + た/⽥ = 樽
- - き/木 + 龸 + 龸 = 橇
- - き/木 + 宿 + 龸 = 橈
- - き/木 + さ/阝 + ら/月 = 橢
- - き/木 + ま/石 + り/分 = 橦
- - き/木 + つ/土 + 囗 = 橲
- - き/木 + 日 + 龸 = 橸
- - き/木 + 宿 + 氷/氵 = 檄
- - き/木 + う/宀/#3 + 日 = 檐
- - き/木 + も/門 + 氷/氵 = 檠
- - き/木 + 囗 + れ/口 = 檣
- - き/木 + 龸 + へ/⺩ = 檮
- - き/木 + す/発 + ⺼ = 檻
- - き/木 + 宿 + や/疒 = 櫂
- - き/木 + た/⽥ + た/⽥ = 櫑
- - き/木 + 宿 + 日 = 櫓
- - き/木 + ち/竹 + さ/阝 = 櫛
- - き/木 + こ/子 + ん/止 = 櫪
- - き/木 + ち/竹 + selector 1 = 櫺
- - え/訁 + 宿 + き/木 = 欒
- - に/氵 + 宿 + き/木 = 沐
- - よ/广 + よ/广 + き/木 = 牀
- - ま/石 + 宿 + き/木 = 磔
- - ち/竹 + 宿 + き/木 = 簗
- - 心 + う/宀/#3 + き/木 = 菻
- - く/艹 + 宿 + き/木 = 藁
- - き/木 + ま/石 + selector 1 = 蘖
- - き/木 + そ/馬 + 比 = 麓

==== Compounds of 甚 ====
- - つ/土 + き/木 = 堪
- - 心 + selector 1 + き/木 = 椹
- - に/氵 + selector 1 + き/木 = 湛
- - ま/石 + selector 1 + き/木 = 碪
- - の/禾 + selector 1 + き/木 = 糂
- - か/金 + selector 1 + き/木 = 鍖

==== Compounds of 巳, 已, and 己 ====
- - 火 + selector 2 + き/木 = 煕
- - ね/示 + 宿 + き/木 = 祀
- - い/糹/#2 + き/木 = 紀
- - え/訁 + き/木 = 記
- - は/辶 + き/木 = 起
- - せ/食 + き/木 = 配
- - き/木 + る/忄 = 忌
- - へ/⺩ + き/木 = 妃
- - 心 + 数 + き/木 = 杞

==== Compounds of 其 ====
- - ほ/方 + き/木 = 旗
  - - ち/竹 + ほ/方 + き/木 = 籏
- - ん/止 + き/木 = 欺
- - ら/月 + き/木 = 期
- - き/木 + つ/土 = 基
- - に/氵 + selector 4 + き/木 = 淇
- - ね/示 + selector 4 + き/木 = 祺
- - の/禾 + selector 4 + き/木 = 稘
- - ち/竹 + selector 4 + き/木 = 箕
- - そ/馬 + selector 4 + き/木 = 騏
- - き/木 + 宿 + を/貝 = 斯
  - - よ/广 + 宿 + き/木 = 厮
  - - よ/广 + 龸 + き/木 = 廝
- - ら/月 + 宿 + き/木 = 朞
- - き/木 + 宿 + ま/石 = 碁
- - き/木 + 宿 + そ/馬 = 麒

==== Compounds of 未, 末, and 本 ====
- - き/木 + な/亻 = 来
  - - き/木 + き/木 + な/亻 = 來
    - - ゆ/彳 + き/木 + な/亻 = 徠
  - - る/忄 + き/木 + な/亻 = 憖
  - - を/貝 + き/木 + な/亻 = 賚
- - の/禾 + き/木 = 乗
  - - の/禾 + の/禾 + き/木 = 乘
    - - selector 1 + の/禾 + き/木 = 乖
- - そ/馬 + き/木 = 業
- - お/頁 + き/木 = 魅
- - う/宀/#3 + き/木 + selector 4 = 寐
- - 日 + き/木 + selector 4 = 昧
- - め/目 + き/木 + selector 4 = 眛
- - き/木 + せ/食 = 耗
- - え/訁 + き/木 + な/亻 = 誄
- - き/木 + よ/广 + り/分 = 釐
- - て/扌 + き/木 + selector 5 = 抹
- - に/氵 + き/木 + selector 5 = 沫
- - の/禾 + き/木 + selector 5 = 秣
- - 心 + き/木 + selector 5 = 茉
- - 心 + き/木 + な/亻 = 莱
- - と/戸 + き/木 + selector 5 = 靺
- - ち/竹 + き/木 + selector 6 = 笨
- - み/耳 + き/木 + selector 6 = 躰
- - 日 + き/木 + selector 6 = 皋

==== Compounds of 北 ====
- - ⺼ + き/木 = 背
- - き/木 + た/⽥ + こ/子 = 冀
  - - そ/馬 + 宿 + き/木 = 驥

==== Other compounds ====
- - 仁/亻 + き/木 = 僅
- - ぬ/力 + き/木 = 勤
- - ゑ/訁 + き/木 = 謹
- - う/宀/#3 + き/木 = 空
  - - な/亻 + う/宀/#3 + き/木 = 倥
  - - れ/口 + う/宀/#3 + き/木 = 啌
  - - き/木 + う/宀/#3 + き/木 = 椌
  - - ち/竹 + う/宀/#3 + き/木 = 箜
  - - ⺼ + う/宀/#3 + き/木 = 腔
- - を/貝 + き/木 = 貴
  - - ひ/辶 + き/木 = 遺
  - - も/門 + を/貝 + き/木 = 匱
    - - き/木 + を/貝 + き/木 = 櫃
  - - め/目 + を/貝 + き/木 = 瞶
  - - ち/竹 + を/貝 + き/木 = 簣
  - - せ/食 + を/貝 + き/木 = 饋
- - き/木 + ゑ/訁 = 叢
- - り/分 + 宿 + き/木 = 禽
  - - て/扌 + 宿 + き/木 = 擒
- - 火 + 宿 + き/木 = 熈
- - へ/⺩ + 宿 + き/木 = 瑾
- - き/木 + め/目 + 宿 = 覲
- - せ/食 + 宿 + き/木 = 饉
- - 心 + 龸 + き/木 = 菫
- - き/木 + 心 + 心 = 蕊
