= Braille pattern dots-2456 =

Braille pattern

6-dot braille cells
⠀	⠁	⠃	⠉	⠙	⠑	⠋	⠛	⠓	⠊	⠚	⠈	⠘
⠄	⠅	⠇	⠍	⠝	⠕	⠏	⠟	⠗	⠎	⠞	⠌	⠜
⠤	⠥	⠧	⠭	⠽	⠵	⠯	⠿	⠷	⠮	⠾	⠬	⠼
⠠	⠡	⠣	⠩	⠹	⠱	⠫	⠻	⠳	⠪	⠺	⠨	⠸
⠀	⠂	⠆	⠒	⠲	⠢	⠖	⠶	⠦	⠔	⠴	⠐	⠰

The Braille pattern dots-2456 ( ⠺ ) is a 6-dot braille cell with the top right, both middle, and bottom right dots raised, or an 8-dot braille cell with the top right, both upper-middle, and lower-middle right dots raised. It is represented by the Unicode code point U+283a, and in Braille ASCII with W.

Character information
Preview	⠺ (braille pattern dots-2456)	
Unicode name	BRAILLE PATTERN DOTS-2456	
Encodings	decimal	hex
Unicode	10298	U+283A
UTF-8	226 160 186	E2 A0 BA
Numeric character reference	&#10298;	&#x283A;
Braille ASCII	88	58

== Unified Braille ==
In unified international braille, the braille pattern dots-2456 is used to represent the labio-velar approximant, /w/, or otherwise as needed.

=== Table of unified braille values ===
French Braille	W, om, -tt-, "tous"
English Braille	W
English contraction	will
German Braille	W
Bharati Braille	ठ / ਠ / ઠ / ঠ / ଠ / ఠ / ಠ / ഠ / ඨ / ٹھ
Icelandic Braille	W
IPA Braille	/w/
Russian Braille	В (v)
Slovak Braille	W
Arabic Braille	و
Persian Braille	و
Irish Braille	W
Thai Braille	ว w
Luxembourgish Braille	w (minuscule)

== Other braille ==
Japanese Braille	so / そ / ソ
Korean Braille	ui / ㅢ
Mainland Chinese Braille	wei, -ui
Taiwanese Braille	ai / ㄞ
Two-Cell Chinese Braille	mi- -á
Algerian Braille	ـٍ (tanwīn)

== Plus dots 7 and 8 ==
Related to Braille pattern dots-2456 are Braille patterns 24567, 24568, and 245678, which are used in 8-dot braille systems, such as Gardner-Salinas and Luxembourgish Braille.

Character information
Preview	⡺ (braille pattern dots-24567)		⢺ (braille pattern dots-24568)		⣺ (braille pattern dots-245678)	
Unicode name	BRAILLE PATTERN DOTS-24567		BRAILLE PATTERN DOTS-24568		BRAILLE PATTERN DOTS-245678	
Encodings	decimal	hex	dec	hex	dec	hex
Unicode	10362	U+287A	10426	U+28BA	10490	U+28FA
UTF-8	226 161 186	E2 A1 BA	226 162 186	E2 A2 BA	226 163 186	E2 A3 BA
Numeric character reference	&#10362;	&#x287A;	&#10426;	&#x28BA;	&#10490;	&#x28FA;

	dots 24567	dots 24568	dots 245678
Gardner Salinas Braille	W (capital)	ω (omega)	Ω (Omega)
Luxembourgish Braille	W (capital)		

== Related 8-dot kantenji patterns ==
In the Japanese kantenji braille, the standard 8-dot Braille patterns 3568, 13568, 34568, and 134568 are the patterns related to Braille pattern dots-2456, since the two additional dots of kantenji patterns 02456, 24567, and 024567 are placed above the base 6-dot cell, instead of below, as in standard 8-dot braille.

Character information
Preview	⢴ (braille pattern dots-3568)		⢵ (braille pattern dots-13568)		⢼ (braille pattern dots-34568)		⢽ (braille pattern dots-134568)	
Unicode name	BRAILLE PATTERN DOTS-3568		BRAILLE PATTERN DOTS-13568		BRAILLE PATTERN DOTS-34568		BRAILLE PATTERN DOTS-134568	
Encodings	decimal	hex	dec	hex	dec	hex	dec	hex
Unicode	10420	U+28B4	10421	U+28B5	10428	U+28BC	10429	U+28BD
UTF-8	226 162 180	E2 A2 B4	226 162 181	E2 A2 B5	226 162 188	E2 A2 BC	226 162 189	E2 A2 BD
Numeric character reference	&#10420;	&#x28B4;	&#10421;	&#x28B5;	&#10428;	&#x28BC;	&#10429;	&#x28BD;

=== Kantenji using braille patterns 3568, 13568, 34568, or 134568 ===
This listing includes kantenji using Braille pattern dots-2456 for all 6349 kanji found in JIS C 6226-1978.

- - 馬

==== Variants and thematic compounds ====
- - selector 1 + そ/馬 = 曹
- - selector 2 + そ/馬 = 遂
- - selector 3 + そ/馬 = 曾
- - selector 4 + そ/馬 = 曽
  - - selector 4 + selector 4 + そ/馬 = 彖
- - selector 5 + そ/馬 = 且
- - selector 6 + そ/馬 = 丑
  - - selector 6 + selector 6 + そ/馬 = 豕
- - そ/馬 + selector 1 = 牛
- - そ/馬 + selector 2 = 羊
- - そ/馬 + selector 3 = 豚
- - そ/馬 + selector 4 = 午
- - そ/馬 + selector 5 = 駒
- - そ/馬 + selector 6 = 象
  - - そ/馬 + selector 6 + selector 6 = 豸
- - 比 + そ/馬 = 小
- - そ/馬 + う/宀/#3 = 兎
- - そ/馬 + 比 = 鹿

==== Compounds of 馬 ====
- - そ/馬 + ち/竹 = 馳
- - そ/馬 + く/艹 = 馴
- - そ/馬 + ゑ/訁 = 駁
- - そ/馬 + た/⽥ = 駅
  - - そ/馬 + そ/馬 + た/⽥ = 驛
- - そ/馬 + も/門 = 駆
  - - そ/馬 + そ/馬 + も/門 = 驅
- - そ/馬 + へ/⺩ = 駐
- - そ/馬 + え/訁 = 駸
- - そ/馬 + か/金 = 騎
- - そ/馬 + む/車 = 騒
  - - そ/馬 + そ/馬 + む/車 = 騷
- - そ/馬 + り/分 = 験
  - - そ/馬 + そ/馬 + り/分 = 驗
- - ち/竹 + そ/馬 = 篤
- - く/艹 + そ/馬 = 薦
- - け/犬 + そ/馬 = 駄
- - ら/月 + そ/馬 = 騰
- - も/門 + そ/馬 = 驚
- - そ/馬 + す/発 = 罵
- - ふ/女 + 宿 + そ/馬 = 媽
- - そ/馬 + 宿 + 心 = 憑
- - へ/⺩ + 宿 + そ/馬 = 瑪
- - ま/石 + 龸 + そ/馬 = 碼
- - に/氵 + う/宀/#3 + そ/馬 = 覊
- - も/門 + 宿 + そ/馬 = 闖
- - さ/阝 + 宿 + そ/馬 = 隲
- - そ/馬 + 宿 + ゑ/訁 = 馭
- - 氷/氵 + う/宀/#3 + そ/馬 = 馮
- - そ/馬 + 龸 + selector 3 = 馼
- - そ/馬 + く/艹 + selector 4 = 駈
- - そ/馬 + ふ/女 + ゑ/訁 = 駑
- - そ/馬 + ぬ/力 + れ/口 = 駕
- - そ/馬 + selector 4 + な/亻 = 駘
- - そ/馬 + れ/口 + な/亻 = 駛
- - そ/馬 + 宿 + ひ/辶 = 駝
- - そ/馬 + 数 + る/忄 = 駟
- - そ/馬 + 龸 + と/戸 = 駢
- - そ/馬 + selector 5 + ゐ/幺 = 駭
- - そ/馬 + 龸 + ち/竹 = 駮
- - そ/馬 + す/発 + れ/口 = 駱
- - そ/馬 + か/金 + selector 4 = 駲
- - そ/馬 + 宿 + か/金 = 駻
- - そ/馬 + 宿 + む/車 = 駿
- - そ/馬 + た/⽥ + selector 4 = 騁
- - そ/馬 + 宿 + い/糹/#2 = 騅
- - そ/馬 + selector 4 + き/木 = 騏
- - そ/馬 + 宿 + へ/⺩ = 騙
- - そ/馬 + れ/口 + れ/口 = 騨
- - う/宀/#3 + 宿 + そ/馬 = 騫
- - そ/馬 + た/⽥ + ゐ/幺 = 騾
- - そ/馬 + 宿 + く/艹 = 驀
- - そ/馬 + selector 1 + う/宀/#3 = 驂
- - そ/馬 + に/氵 + ね/示 = 驃
- - そ/馬 + 宿 + つ/土 = 驍
- - そ/馬 + 宿 + の/禾 = 驕
- - そ/馬 + み/耳 + ゑ/訁 = 驟
- - そ/馬 + 宿 + た/⽥ = 驢
- - そ/馬 + 宿 + み/耳 = 驤
- - そ/馬 + 宿 + き/木 = 驥
- - そ/馬 + 宿 + け/犬 = 驩
- - そ/馬 + 囗 + 比 = 驪
- - そ/馬 + う/宀/#3 + そ/馬 = 驫

==== Compounds of 曹 ====
- - ひ/辶 + そ/馬 = 遭
- - き/木 + selector 1 + そ/馬 = 槽
- - の/禾 + selector 1 + そ/馬 = 糟
- - ふ/女 + selector 1 + そ/馬 = 艚
- - に/氵 + 宿 + そ/馬 = 漕

==== Compounds of 遂 ====
- - そ/馬 + さ/阝 = 隊
  - - そ/馬 + つ/土 = 墜
- - 火 + selector 2 + そ/馬 = 燧
- - さ/阝 + selector 2 + そ/馬 = 隧

==== Compounds of 曾 ====
- - 仁/亻 + そ/馬 = 僧
- - と/戸 + そ/馬 = 層
- - る/忄 + そ/馬 = 憎
- - を/貝 + そ/馬 = 贈
  - - れ/口 + を/貝 + そ/馬 = 囎
- - れ/口 + 宿 + そ/馬 = 噌
- - そ/馬 + selector 6 + か/金 = 甑

==== Compounds of 曽 and 彖 ====
- - つ/土 + そ/馬 = 増

==== Compounds of 且 ====
- - ぬ/力 + そ/馬 = 助
  - - 日 + ぬ/力 + そ/馬 = 勗
  - - こ/子 + ぬ/力 + そ/馬 = 耡
  - - く/艹 + ぬ/力 + そ/馬 = 莇
  - - か/金 + ぬ/力 + そ/馬 = 鋤
- - う/宀/#3 + そ/馬 = 宜
  - - 心 + う/宀/#3 + そ/馬 = 萓
  - - え/訁 + う/宀/#3 + そ/馬 = 誼
- - た/⽥ + そ/馬 = 畳
  - - た/⽥ + た/⽥ + そ/馬 = 疊
- - ね/示 + そ/馬 = 祖
- - の/禾 + そ/馬 = 租
- - い/糹/#2 + そ/馬 = 組
- - さ/阝 + そ/馬 = 阻
- - そ/馬 + の/禾 = 粗
- - な/亻 + selector 5 + そ/馬 = 俎
- - れ/口 + selector 5 + そ/馬 = 咀
- - ふ/女 + selector 5 + そ/馬 = 姐
- - や/疒 + selector 5 + そ/馬 = 岨
- - ゆ/彳 + selector 5 + そ/馬 = 徂
- - き/木 + selector 5 + そ/馬 = 柤
- - に/氵 + selector 5 + そ/馬 = 沮
- - め/目 + selector 5 + そ/馬 = 爼
- - ま/石 + selector 5 + そ/馬 = 砠
- - く/艹 + selector 5 + そ/馬 = 苴
- - む/車 + selector 5 + そ/馬 = 蛆
- - え/訁 + selector 5 + そ/馬 = 詛
- - た/⽥ + 宿 + そ/馬 = 疂
- - や/疒 + 宿 + そ/馬 = 疽
- - そ/馬 + 宿 + ら/月 = 盖
- - そ/馬 + 龸 + ら/月 = 葢
- - そ/馬 + ん/止 + の/禾 = 齟

==== Compounds of 丑 and 豕 ====
- - ゐ/幺 + そ/馬 = 縁
  - - 心 + ゐ/幺 + そ/馬 = 櫞
- - 龸 + そ/馬 = 豪
  - - れ/口 + 龸 + そ/馬 = 喙
  - - つ/土 + 龸 + そ/馬 = 壕
  - - き/木 + 龸 + そ/馬 = 椽
  - - に/氵 + 龸 + そ/馬 = 濠
- - は/辶 + そ/馬 = 逐
- - そ/馬 + ね/示 = 劇
- - け/犬 + selector 6 + そ/馬 = 狃
- - か/金 + selector 6 + そ/馬 = 鈕
- - す/発 + す/発 + そ/馬 = 據
- - 日 + 宿 + そ/馬 = 曚
- - ら/月 + 宿 + そ/馬 = 朦
- - 心 + 宿 + そ/馬 = 檬
- - ま/石 + 宿 + そ/馬 = 毅
- - 火 + 宿 + そ/馬 = 燹
- - め/目 + 宿 + そ/馬 = 矇
- - く/艹 + 宿 + そ/馬 = 蒙
- - そ/馬 + selector 1 + ⺼ = 衄
- - け/犬 + 宿 + そ/馬 = 豢
- - ひ/辶 + す/発 + そ/馬 = 遽
- - せ/食 + す/発 + そ/馬 = 醵
- - る/忄 + selector 3 + そ/馬 = 忸

==== Compounds of 牛 ====
- - な/亻 + そ/馬 = 件
- - ろ/十 + そ/馬 = 牽
- - 囗 + そ/馬 = 解
  - - よ/广 + 囗 + そ/馬 = 廨
  - - る/忄 + 囗 + そ/馬 = 懈
  - - む/車 + 囗 + そ/馬 = 蟹
  - - ひ/辶 + 囗 + そ/馬 = 邂
- - え/訁 + そ/馬 = 許
  - - に/氵 + え/訁 + そ/馬 = 滸
- - そ/馬 + 数 = 物
  - - そ/馬 + る/忄 = 惣
- - そ/馬 + 氷/氵 = 牧
- - そ/馬 + い/糹/#2 = 牲
- - そ/馬 + し/巿 = 特
- - れ/口 + そ/馬 + selector 1 = 吽
- - う/宀/#3 + そ/馬 + selector 1 = 牢
- - そ/馬 + selector 1 + ん/止 = 牴
- - そ/馬 + そ/馬 + そ/馬 = 犇
- - そ/馬 + 宿 + め/目 = 牝
- - そ/馬 + 宿 + お/頁 = 牡
- - そ/馬 + ら/月 + れ/口 = 牾
- - そ/馬 + 宿 + と/戸 = 犀
- - そ/馬 + の/禾 + ぬ/力 = 犁
- - そ/馬 + の/禾 + selector 1 = 犂
- - そ/馬 + 比 + え/訁 = 犒
- - そ/馬 + 火 + 火 = 犖
- - そ/馬 + つ/土 + を/貝 = 犢
- - そ/馬 + 龸 + そ/馬 = 犧
- - そ/馬 + 龸 + そ/馬 = 犧

==== Compounds of 羊 ====
- - や/疒 + そ/馬 = 痒
  - - や/疒 + そ/馬 + や/疒 = 癢
- - む/車 + そ/馬 = 蟻
- - ゑ/訁 + そ/馬 = 詳
- - み/耳 + そ/馬 = 躾
- - せ/食 + そ/馬 = 鮮
  - - せ/食 + そ/馬 + や/疒 = 鱶
  - - や/疒 + せ/食 + そ/馬 = 癬
  - - 心 + せ/食 + そ/馬 = 蘚
- - そ/馬 + 囗 = 義
  - - そ/馬 + な/亻 = 儀
  - - や/疒 + そ/馬 + 囗 = 嶬
  - - 日 + そ/馬 + 囗 = 曦
  - - ま/石 + そ/馬 + 囗 = 礒
  - - ふ/女 + そ/馬 + 囗 = 艤
- - そ/馬 + こ/子 = 差
  - - れ/口 + そ/馬 + こ/子 = 嗟
  - - や/疒 + そ/馬 + こ/子 = 嵯
  - - て/扌 + そ/馬 + こ/子 = 搓
  - - き/木 + そ/馬 + こ/子 = 槎
  - - へ/⺩ + そ/馬 + こ/子 = 瑳
  - - ま/石 + そ/馬 + こ/子 = 磋
  - - い/糹/#2 + そ/馬 + こ/子 = 縒
  - - み/耳 + そ/馬 + こ/子 = 蹉
- - そ/馬 + に/氵 = 洋
- - そ/馬 + け/犬 = 美
- - そ/馬 + ん/止 = 羨
- - お/頁 + そ/馬 = 群
- - そ/馬 + そ/馬 = 犠
- - め/目 + そ/馬 = 着
- - き/木 + そ/馬 = 様
  - - き/木 + き/木 + そ/馬 = 樣
- - そ/馬 + れ/口 = 善
  - - そ/馬 + そ/馬 + れ/口 = 譱
- - そ/馬 + き/木 = 業
- - そ/馬 + や/疒 = 養
  - - に/氵 + そ/馬 + や/疒 = 瀁
- - な/亻 + そ/馬 + selector 2 = 佯
- - む/車 + そ/馬 + selector 2 = 恙
- - 囗 + そ/馬 + selector 2 = 觧
- - そ/馬 + 宿 + ふ/女 = 姜
- - や/疒 + う/宀/#3 + そ/馬 = 嵳
- - よ/广 + 宿 + そ/馬 = 庠
- - 氷/氵 + 龸 + そ/馬 = 漾
- - そ/馬 + 宿 + 宿 = 羌
- - そ/馬 + 宿 + こ/子 = 羔
- - そ/馬 + 仁/亻 + ろ/十 = 羚
- - そ/馬 + 宿 + ん/止 = 羝
- - そ/馬 + 宿 + そ/馬 = 羞
- - そ/馬 + 宿 + そ/馬 = 羞
- - そ/馬 + お/頁 + selector 1 = 羣
- - そ/馬 + 宿 + 火 = 羮
- - そ/馬 + 宿 + 氷/氵 = 羯
- - そ/馬 + の/禾 + ゐ/幺 = 羲
- - そ/馬 + 龸 + 囗 = 羶
- - ⺼ + 宿 + そ/馬 = 羸
- - そ/馬 + 龸 + 火 = 羹
- - そ/馬 + む/車 + selector 2 = 翔

==== Compounds of 豚 ====
- - れ/口 + そ/馬 + selector 3 = 啄
- - へ/⺩ + そ/馬 + selector 3 = 琢
- - ひ/辶 + そ/馬 + selector 3 = 遯

==== Compounds of 午 ====
- - る/忄 + そ/馬 + selector 4 = 忤
- - き/木 + そ/馬 + selector 4 = 杵

==== Compounds of 象 and 豸 ====
- - そ/馬 + ひ/辶 = 豹
- - そ/馬 + ろ/十 = 豺
- - そ/馬 + 日 = 貌
  - - く/艹 + そ/馬 + 日 = 藐
- - 心 + そ/馬 + selector 6 = 橡
- - そ/馬 + selector 6 + く/艹 = 貘
- - そ/馬 + 宿 + 比 = 豼
- - そ/馬 + ぬ/力 + 囗 = 貂
- - そ/馬 + な/亻 + き/木 = 貅
- - そ/馬 + 数 + め/目 = 貊
- - そ/馬 + 比 + り/分 = 貍
- - そ/馬 + こ/子 + 宿 = 貎
- - そ/馬 + 龸 + 比 = 貔
- - て/扌 + 宿 + そ/馬 = 掾
- - ち/竹 + 宿 + そ/馬 = 篆
- - む/車 + 宿 + そ/馬 = 蠡

==== Compounds of 小 ====
- - ほ/方 + そ/馬 = 少
  - - ふ/女 + そ/馬 = 妙
  - - て/扌 + そ/馬 = 抄
  - - ん/止 + そ/馬 = 歩
    - - さ/阝 + ん/止 + そ/馬 = 陟
  - - 火 + そ/馬 = 炒
  - - ま/石 + そ/馬 = 砂
  - - 日 + そ/馬 = 秒
  - - そ/馬 + ぬ/力 = 劣
  - - そ/馬 + め/目 = 省
  - - も/門 + ほ/方 + そ/馬 = 尠
  - - き/木 + ほ/方 + そ/馬 = 杪
  - - め/目 + ほ/方 + そ/馬 = 眇
    - - に/氵 + ほ/方 + そ/馬 = 渺
    - - ゐ/幺 + ほ/方 + そ/馬 = 緲
  - - い/糹/#2 + ほ/方 + そ/馬 = 紗
  - - か/金 + ほ/方 + そ/馬 = 鈔
- - そ/馬 + ⺼ = 肖
  - - 宿 + そ/馬 = 宵
  - - れ/口 + そ/馬 = 哨
  - - に/氵 + そ/馬 = 消
  - - そ/馬 + と/戸 = 屑
  - - や/疒 + そ/馬 + ⺼ = 峭
  - - る/忄 + そ/馬 + ⺼ = 悄
  - - き/木 + そ/馬 + ⺼ = 梢
  - - の/禾 + そ/馬 + ⺼ = 稍
  - - え/訁 + そ/馬 + ⺼ = 誚
  - - は/辶 + そ/馬 + ⺼ = 趙
  - - ひ/辶 + そ/馬 + ⺼ = 逍
  - - か/金 + そ/馬 + ⺼ = 銷
  - - ち/竹 + そ/馬 + ⺼ = 霄
  - - と/戸 + そ/馬 + ⺼ = 鞘
  - - せ/食 + そ/馬 + ⺼ = 鮹
- - さ/阝 + 比 + そ/馬 = 隙
- - そ/馬 + 数 + り/分 = 尓
- - そ/馬 + 比 + け/犬 = 尖

==== Compounds of 兎 ====
- - そ/馬 + そ/馬 + う/宀/#3 = 兔
- - 心 + そ/馬 + う/宀/#3 = 莵

==== Compounds of 鹿 ====
- - つ/土 + そ/馬 + 比 = 塵
- - に/氵 + そ/馬 + 比 = 漉
- - む/車 + そ/馬 + 比 = 轆
- - か/金 + そ/馬 + 比 = 鏖
- - く/艹 + そ/馬 + 比 = 麁
- - へ/⺩ + そ/馬 + 比 = 麈
- - の/禾 + そ/馬 + 比 = 麋
- - こ/子 + そ/馬 + 比 = 麌
- - き/木 + そ/馬 + 比 = 麓
- - 囗 + そ/馬 + 比 = 麕
- - こ/子 + 宿 + そ/馬 = 麑
- - き/木 + 宿 + そ/馬 = 麒
- - そ/馬 + み/耳 + し/巿 = 麝
- - の/禾 + 宿 + そ/馬 = 麟

==== Other compounds ====
- - そ/馬 + 宿 = 争
  - - 氷/氵 + そ/馬 = 浄
    - - 氷/氵 + 氷/氵 + そ/馬 = 淨
  - - そ/馬 + そ/馬 + 宿 = 爭
    - - や/疒 + そ/馬 + 宿 = 崢
    - - ち/竹 + そ/馬 + 宿 = 箏
  - - か/金 + そ/馬 + 宿 = 錚
  - - ち/竹 + 龸 + そ/馬 = 筝
- - す/発 + そ/馬 = 拠
- - 心 + そ/馬 = 蘇
- - ⺼ + そ/馬 = 衆
  - - せ/食 + ⺼ + そ/馬 = 鰥
- - そ/馬 + 心 = 慶
- - そ/馬 + て/扌 = 挿
  - - そ/馬 + そ/馬 + て/扌 = 插
- - そ/馬 + ら/月 = 蓋
- - そ/馬 + ん/止 + selector 1 = 歃
- - の/禾 + ほ/方 + そ/馬 = 穆
- - ゑ/訁 + 宿 + そ/馬 = 聚
- - 心 + 龸 + そ/馬 = 蘓
