= Braille pattern dots-25 =

Braille pattern

6-dot braille cells
⠀	⠁	⠃	⠉	⠙	⠑	⠋	⠛	⠓	⠊	⠚	⠈	⠘
⠄	⠅	⠇	⠍	⠝	⠕	⠏	⠟	⠗	⠎	⠞	⠌	⠜
⠤	⠥	⠧	⠭	⠽	⠵	⠯	⠿	⠷	⠮	⠾	⠬	⠼
⠠	⠡	⠣	⠩	⠹	⠱	⠫	⠻	⠳	⠪	⠺	⠨	⠸
shift down	⠂	⠆	⠒	⠲	⠢	⠖	⠶	⠦	⠔	⠴	⠐	⠰

The Braille pattern dots-25 ( ⠒ ) is a 6-dot braille cell with both middle dots raised, or an 8-dot braille cell with both upper-middle dots raised. It is represented by the Unicode code point U+2812, and in Braille ASCII with the number 3.

Character information
Preview	⠒ (braille pattern dots-25)	
Unicode name	BRAILLE PATTERN DOTS-25	
Encodings	decimal	hex
Unicode	10258	U+2812
UTF-8	226 160 146	E2 A0 92
Numeric character reference	&#10258;	&#x2812;
Braille ASCII	51	33

== Unified Braille ==
In unified international braille, the braille pattern dots-25 is used to represent a colon or other punctuation or mathematical operators.

=== Table of unified braille values ===
French Braille	: (colon), (math) ÷, cr, con
English Braille	: (colon), -cc-
English Contraction	con-
German Braille	al
Bharati Braille	ञ / ਞ / ઞ / ঞ / ଞ / ఞ / ಞ / ഞ / ஞ / ඤ
IPA Braille	ː (long vowel)
Russian Braille	: (colon)
Slovak Braille	: (colon)
Arabic Braille	ـْ (sukun)
Irish Braille	con
Thai Braille	ู ū

== Other braille ==
Japanese Braille	ー (chōon)
Korean Braille	-n / ㄴ
Mainland Chinese Braille	wen, -un
Taiwanese Braille	wo, -uo / ㄨㄛ
Two-Cell Chinese Braille	y- -o/-e
Nemeth Braille	3

== Plus dots 7 and 8 ==
Related to Braille pattern dots-25 are Braille patterns 257, 258, and 2578, which are used in 8-dot braille systems, such as Gardner-Salinas and Luxembourgish Braille.

Character information
Preview	⡒ (braille pattern dots-257)		⢒ (braille pattern dots-258)		⣒ (braille pattern dots-2578)	
Unicode name	BRAILLE PATTERN DOTS-257		BRAILLE PATTERN DOTS-258		BRAILLE PATTERN DOTS-2578	
Encodings	decimal	hex	dec	hex	dec	hex
Unicode	10322	U+2852	10386	U+2892	10450	U+28D2
UTF-8	226 161 146	E2 A1 92	226 162 146	E2 A2 92	226 163 146	E2 A3 92
Numeric character reference	&#10322;	&#x2852;	&#10386;	&#x2892;	&#10450;	&#x28D2;

	dots 257	dots 258	dots 2578
Gardner Salinas Braille	+ (plus sign)	· (multiplication point)	" (quote marks)

== Related 8-dot kantenji patterns ==
In the Japanese kantenji braille, the standard 8-dot Braille patterns 36, 136, 346, and 1346 are the patterns related to Braille pattern dots-25, since the two additional dots of kantenji patterns 025, 257, and 0257 are placed above the base 6-dot cell, instead of below, as in standard 8-dot braille.

Character information
Preview	⠤ (braille pattern dots-36)		⠥ (braille pattern dots-136)		⠬ (braille pattern dots-346)		⠭ (braille pattern dots-1346)	
Unicode name	BRAILLE PATTERN DOTS-36		BRAILLE PATTERN DOTS-136		BRAILLE PATTERN DOTS-346		BRAILLE PATTERN DOTS-1346	
Encodings	decimal	hex	dec	hex	dec	hex	dec	hex
Unicode	10276	U+2824	10277	U+2825	10284	U+282C	10285	U+282D
UTF-8	226 160 164	E2 A0 A4	226 160 165	E2 A0 A5	226 160 172	E2 A0 AC	226 160 173	E2 A0 AD
Numeric character reference	&#10276;	&#x2824;	&#10277;	&#x2825;	&#10284;	&#x282C;	&#10285;	&#x282D;

=== Kantenji using braille patterns 36, 136, 346, or 1346 ===
This listing includes kantenji using Braille pattern dots-25 for all 6349 kanji found in JIS C 6226-1978.

- - 宿

==== Variants and thematic compounds ====
- ⠃⠬ - selector 1 + 宿 = 元
  - ⠃⠂⠬ - selector 1 + selector 1 + 宿 = 兀
- ⠅⠤⠬ - selector 2 + 宿 + 宿 = 丿
- ⠑⠬ - selector 4 + 宿 = 儿
- ⠡⠬ - selector 5 + 宿 = 亢
- ⢁⠬ - selector 6 + 宿 = 兌
- ⠥⠊ - 宿 + selector 1 = 写
- ⠥⡈ - 宿 + selector 3 = 冖
- ⠥⠘ - 宿 + selector 4 = 与
  - ⠥⠤⠘ - 宿 + 宿 + selector 4 = 與
- ⠱⠬ - 比 + 宿 = 中
- ⢑⠬ - 仁/亻 + 宿 = 介
- ⢡⠬ - 数 + 宿 = 兆
- ⢵⠬ - そ/馬 + 宿 = 争

==== Compounds of 宿 ====
- ⠇⠬ - い/糹/# + 宿 = 縮

==== Compounds of ⼧ ====
- ⠥⣞ - 宿 + へ/⺩ = 害
  - ⠥⡚ - 宿 + ぬ/力 = 割
  - ⠥⡪ - 宿 + た/⽥ = 豁
  - ⣷⠤⣞ - め/目 + 宿 + へ/⺩ = 瞎
- ⠥⢊ - 宿 + か/金 = 宇
- ⠥⢎ - 宿 + き/木 = 宋
- ⠥⠼ - 宿 + ろ/十 = 宏
  - ⢱⠤⠼ - 氷/氵 + 宿 + ろ/十 = 浤
  - ⢅⠤⠼ - ⺼ + 宿 + ろ/十 = 肱
- ⠥⠾ - 宿 + れ/口 = 客
  - ⠷⠤⠾ - れ/口 + 宿 + れ/口 = 喀
- ⠥⣌ - 宿 + 日 = 宴
- ⠥⢼ - 宿 + そ/馬 = 宵
- ⠥⣚ - 宿 + ふ/女 = 富
  - ⠃⠤⣚ - selector 1 + 宿 + ふ/女 = 冨
  - ⢥⠤⣚ - 心 + +宿 + ふ/女 = 蔔
  - ⣳⠤⣚ - む/車 + 宿 + ふ/女 = 蝠
  - ⣇⠤⣚ - ひ/辶 + 宿 + ふ/女 = 逼
- ⠥⡬ - 宿 + ゑ/訁 = 寝
  - ⠥⠤⡬ - 宿 + 宿 + ゑ/訁 = 寢
- ⠥⡾ - 宿 + て/扌 = 寧
  - ⠷⠤⡾ - れ/口 + 宿 + て/扌 = 嚀
  - ⢥⠤⡾ - 心 + 宿 + て/扌 = 檸
  - ⡇⠤⡾ - に/氵 + 宿 + て/扌 = 濘
  - ⢗⠤⡾ - け/犬 + 宿 + て/扌 = 獰
  - ⣧⠤⡾ - み/耳 + 宿 + て/扌 = 聹
- ⠥⣪ - 宿 + ま/石 = 寵
- ⠥⢪ - 宿 + さ/阝 = 搾
- ⠥⡜ - 宿 + の/禾 = 稼
- ⠥⣘ - 宿 + ゆ/彳 = 窒
  - ⢅⠤⣘ - ⺼ + 宿 + ゆ/彳 = 膣
- ⠥⢜ - 宿 + こ/子 = 窓
- ⠥⣮ - 宿 + み/耳 = 窮
- ⢑⠤⡾ - 仁/亻 + 宿 + て/扌 = 佇
- ⣓⠤⠚ - ふ/女 + 宿 + う/宀/# = 婉
- ⠓⠤⣎ - う/宀/# + 宿 + ひ/辶 = 它
- ⠓⠤⣪ - う/宀/# + 宿 + ま/石 = 宕
- ⠓⠤⢚ - う/宀/# + 宿 + く/艹 = 寞
- ⠓⠤⠚ - う/宀/# + 宿 + う/宀/# = 寥
- ⠓⠤⢎ - う/宀/# + 宿 + き/木 = 寨
- ⠓⠤⠺ - う/宀/# + 宿 + る/忄 = 寰
- ⢇⠤⣎ - き/木 + 宿 + ひ/辶 = 柁
- ⢇⠤⠚ - き/木 + 宿 + う/宀/# = 椀
- ⡇⠤⣎ - に/氵 + 宿 + ひ/辶 = 沱
- ⡕⠤⠚ - の/禾 + 宿 + う/宀/# = 糘
- ⢷⠤⠪ - せ/食 + 宿 + ら/月 = 舘
- ⣓⠤⣎ - ふ/女 + 宿 + ひ/辶 = 舵
- ⣳⠤⠚ - む/車 + 宿 + う/宀/# = 蜿
- ⠓⠤⡬ - う/宀/# + 宿 + ゑ/訁 = 謇
- ⢃⠤⠚ - か/金 + 宿 + う/宀/# = 鋺
- ⠥⠤⢜ - 宿 + 宿 + こ/子 = 窗
- ⣣⠤⠚ - ま/石 + 宿 + う/宀/# = 碗
- ⠥⠤⢜ - 宿 + 宿 + こ/子 = 窗
- ⠓⠤⣸ - う/宀/# + 宿 + 火 = 窰
- ⠓⠤⢨ - う/宀/# + 宿 + 数 = 窶
- ⣱⠤⠮ - 火 + 宿 + り/分 = 竈

==== Compounds of 元 and 兀 ====
- ⣗⠬ - へ/⺩ + 宿 = 玩
- ⠥⠜ - 宿 + お/頁 = 頑
  - ⡗⠤⠜ - ね/示 + 宿 + お/頁 = 頴
- ⠓⠬ - う/宀/# + 宿 = 完
  - ⢣⠬ - さ/阝 + 宿 = 院
  - ⠥⢮ - 宿 + し/巿 = 冠
    - ⢓⠤⢮ - く/艹 + 宿 + し/巿 = 蒄
  - ⡇⠒⠬ - に/氵 + う/宀/# + 宿 = 浣
  - ⣅⠒⠬ - 日 + う/宀/# + 宿 = 皖
  - ⢥⠒⠬ - 心 + う/宀/# + 宿 = 莞
- ⠥⠂⠬ - 宿 + selector 1 + 宿 = 冦
- ⠓⠂⠬ - う/宀/# + selector 1 + 宿 = 寇
- ⣳⠂⠬ - む/車 + selector 1 + 宿 = 翫
- ⢥⠂⠬ - 心 + selector 1 + 宿 = 芫
- ⢣⠂⠬ - さ/阝 + selector 1 + 宿 = 阮
- ⡃⠤⡺ - な/亻 + 宿 + つ/土 = 僥
- ⡑⠤⡺ - や/疒 + 宿 + つ/土 = 嶢
- ⡷⠤⣈ - て/扌 + 宿 + 龸 = 撓
- ⢇⠤⣈ - き/木 + 宿 + 龸 = 橈
- ⠇⠤⡺ - い/糹/# + 宿 + つ/土 = 繞
- ⣳⠤⡺ - む/車 + 宿 + つ/土 = 蟯
- ⣇⠤⡺ - ひ/辶 + 宿 + つ/土 = 遶
- ⢃⠤⡺ - か/金 + 宿 + つ/土 = 鐃
- ⢷⠤⡺ - せ/食 + 宿 + つ/土 = 饒
- ⢵⠤⡺ - そ/馬 + 宿 + つ/土 = 驍

==== Compounds of 儿 and 丿 ====
- ⡓⠬ - ぬ/力 + 宿 = 免
  - ⠥⠬ - 宿 + 宿 = 冤
  - ⣅⠬ - 日 + 宿 = 晩
  - ⣃⠬ - は/辶 + 宿 = 逸
  - ⡃⡒⠬ - な/亻 + ぬ/力 + 宿 = 俛
  - ⣅⡒⠬ - 日 + ぬ/力 + 宿 = 冕
  - ⣓⡒⠬ - ふ/女 + ぬ/力 + 宿 = 娩
  - ⠓⡒⠬ - う/宀/# + ぬ/力 + 宿 = 寃
  - ⠳⡒⠬ - る/忄 + ぬ/力 + 宿 = 悗
  - ⢥⡒⠬ - 心 + ぬ/力 + 宿 = 菟
  - ⡑⡒⠬ - や/疒 + ぬ/力 + 宿 = 巉
  - ⠇⡒⠬ - い/糹/# + ぬ/力 + 宿 = 纔
  - ⠗⡒⠬ - え/訁 + ぬ/力 + 宿 = 讒
- ⢕⠬ - こ/子 + 宿 = 児
  - ⢕⢔⠬ - こ/子 + こ/子 + 宿 = 兒
    - ⡃⢔⠬ - な/亻 + こ/子 + 宿 = 倪
    - ⢵⢔⠬ - そ/馬 + こ/子 + 宿 = 貎
    - ⡧⢔⠬ - ち/竹 + こ/子 + 宿 = 霓
    - ⣵⢔⠬ - も/門 + こ/子 + 宿 = 鬩
    - ⢷⢔⠬ - せ/食 + こ/子 + 宿 = 鯢
- ⣷⠬ - め/目 + 宿 = 見
  - ⢗⠬ - け/犬 + 宿 = 規
    - ⢥⢖⠬ - 心 + け/犬 + 宿 = 槻
  - ⠥⣾ - 宿 + め/目 = 寛
  - ⣷⠤⣺ - め/目 + 宿 + む/車 = 覯
  - ⡃⣶⠬ - な/亻 + め/目 + 宿 = 俔
  - ⣣⣶⠬ - ま/石 + め/目 + 宿 = 硯
  - ⡧⣶⠬ - ち/竹 + め/目 + 宿 = 筧
  - ⣳⣶⠬ - む/車 + め/目 + 宿 = 蜆
  - ⣁⣶⠬ - 龸 + め/目 + 宿 = 覓
  - ⠷⣶⠬ - れ/口 + め/目 + 宿 = 覘
  - ⢑⣶⠬ - 仁/亻 + め/目 + 宿 = 覡
  - ⣑⣶⠬ - ゆ/彳 + め/目 + 宿 = 覦
  - ⡵⣶⠬ - と/戸 + め/目 + 宿 = 覩
  - ⡑⣶⠬ - や/疒 + め/目 + 宿 = 覬
  - ⢇⣶⠬ - き/木 + め/目 + 宿 = 覲
  - ⣷⣶⠬ - め/目 + め/目 + 宿 = 靦
- ⡷⠤⠬ - て/扌 + 宿 + 宿 = 挽
- ⣳⠤⠬ - む/車 + 宿 + 宿 = 輓
- ⡷⠤⠬ - て/扌 + 宿 + 宿 = 挽
- ⣳⠤⠬ - む/車 + 宿 + 宿 = 輓
- ⣳⠤⣈ - む/車 + 宿 + 龸 = 允
- ⠧⠤⠬ - り/分 + 宿 + 宿 = 兜
- ⠷⠤⣺ - れ/口 + 宿 + む/車 = 吮
- ⢗⠤⠬ - け/犬 + 宿 + 宿 = 猊
- ⠥⣴⢈ - 宿 + も/門 + selector 6 = 兇
- ⠧⠤⠬ - り/分 + 宿 + 宿 = 兜
- ⢗⠤⠬ - け/犬 + 宿 + 宿 = 猊
- ⠥⣄⠊ - 宿 + 日 + selector 1 = 皃
- ⢵⠤⠬ - そ/馬 + 宿 + 宿 = 羌

==== Compounds of 亢 ====
- ⡳⠬ - つ/土 + 宿 = 坑
- ⡷⠬ - て/扌 + 宿 = 抗
- ⢇⠬ - き/木 + 宿 = 杭
- ⣓⠬ - ふ/女 + 宿 = 航
- ⠥⣈ - 宿 + 龸 = 冗
  - ⠳⠤⣈ - る/忄 + 宿 + 龸 = 忱
  - ⣷⠤⣈ - め/目 + 宿 + 龸 = 眈
- ⠷⠠⠬ - れ/口 + selector 5 + 宿 = 吭
- ⡃⠤⠬ - な/亻 + 宿 + 宿 = 伉
- ⠕⠤⠬ - お/頁 + 宿 + 宿 = 頏

==== Compounds of ⼇ ====
- ⠥⡞ - 宿 + ね/示 = 衰
  - ⢇⠤⡞ - き/木 + 宿 + ね/示 = 榱
  - ⡧⠤⡞ - ち/竹 + 宿 + ね/示 = 簑
  - ⢓⠤⡞ - く/艹 + 宿 + ね/示 = 蓑
  - ⠥⡖⠊ - 宿 + ね/示 + selector 1 = 袞
- ⠥⡊ - 宿 + な/亻 = 褒
- ⢕⠤⠜ - こ/子 + 宿 + お/頁 = 孰
- ⡷⠤⣮ - て/扌 + 宿 + み/耳 = 攘
- ⢕⠤⢸ - こ/子 + 宿 + 氷/氵 = 敦
- ⣅⠤⢸ - 日 + 宿 + 氷/氵 = 暾
- ⢇⠤⢚ - き/木 + 宿 + く/艹 = 梳
- ⡣⠤⢺ - た/⽥ + 宿 + す/発 = 畆
- ⣁⠤⢾ - 龸 + 宿 + せ/食 = 鶉
- ⡳⠤⣎ - つ/土 + 宿 + ひ/辶 = 壅
- ⣱⠤⢸ - 火 + 宿 + 氷/氵 = 燉
- ⡗⠤⣮ - ね/示 + 宿 + み/耳 = 禳
- ⢃⠤⢸ - か/金 + 宿 + 氷/氵 = 鐓
- ⢵⠤⣮ - そ/馬 + 宿 + み/耳 = 驤
- ⢵⠤⢞ - そ/馬 + 宿 + け/犬 = 驩
- ⢱⠤⠾ - 氷/氵 + 宿 + れ/口 = 凛

==== Compounds of 兌 ====
- ⠷⠬ - れ/口 + 宿 = 兄
  - ⠵⠬ - ろ/十 + 宿 = 克
    - ⠵⠶⠬ - ろ/十 + れ/口 + 宿 = 兢
    - ⠵⠤⡚ - ろ/十 + 宿 + ぬ/力 = 剋
  - ⣁⠬ - 龸 + 宿 = 党
    - ⣁⣀⠬ - 龸 + 龸 + 宿 = 黨
      - ⡃⣀⠬ - な/亻 + 龸 + 宿 = 儻
  - ⣥⠬ - 囗 + 宿 = 呪
  - ⢱⠬ - 氷/氵 + 宿 = 況
    - ⢱⢰⠬ - 氷/氵 + 氷/氵 + 宿 = 况
  - ⡗⠬ - ね/示 + 宿 = 祝
  - ⣣⠬ - ま/石 + 宿 = 競
    - ⣣⣢⠬ - ま/石 + ま/石 + 宿 = 竸
- ⠳⠬ - る/忄 + 宿 = 悦
- ⡕⠬ - の/禾 + 宿 = 税
- ⢅⠬ - ⺼ + 宿 = 脱
- ⠗⠬ - え/訁 + 宿 = 説
- ⢃⠬ - か/金 + 宿 = 鋭
- ⣵⠬ - も/門 + 宿 = 閲
- ⣳⣀⠬ - む/車 + 龸 + 宿 = 蛻

==== Compounds of 写 ====
- ⠥⠤⠊ - 宿 + 宿 + selector 1 = 冩
- ⠓⠤⠊ - う/宀/# + 宿 + selector 1 = 寫
  - ⡇⠤⠊ - に/氵 + 宿 + selector 1 = 瀉

==== Compounds of 冖 ====
- ⠥⣺ - 宿 + む/車 = 軍
  - ⣅⠤⣺ - 日 + 宿 + む/車 = 暈
  - ⡇⠤⣺ - に/氵 + 宿 + む/車 = 渾
  - ⣗⠤⣺ - へ/⺩ + 宿 + む/車 = 琿
  - ⣇⠤⣺ - ひ/辶 + 宿 + む/車 = 皹
  - ⢓⠤⣺ - く/艹 + 宿 + む/車 = 葷
  - ⠗⠤⣺ - え/訁 + 宿 + む/車 = 諢
- ⣳⠬ - む/車 + 宿 = 風
  - ⣳⠤⢞ - む/車 + 宿 + け/犬 = 飆
  - ⡑⣲⠬ - や/疒 + む/車 + 宿 = 瘋
  - ⠗⣲⠬ - え/訁 + む/車 + 宿 = 諷
  - ⣁⣲⠬ - 龸 + む/車 + 宿 = 颪
  - ⣣⣲⠬ - ま/石 + む/車 + 宿 = 颯
- ⠥⣜ - 宿 + ほ/方 = 夙
- ⣵⠤⡈ - も/門 + 宿 + selector 3 = 匸
  - ⣵⠤⢮ - も/門 + 宿 + し/巿 = 匝
  - ⣵⠤⠮ - も/門 + 宿 + り/分 = 匳
- ⠷⠤⣾ - れ/口 + 宿 + め/目 = 嚏
- ⣱⠤⡺ - 火 + 宿 + つ/土 = 塋
- ⡳⠤⠊ - つ/土 + 宿 + selector 1 = 壷
- ⢕⠤⠼ - こ/子 + 宿 + ろ/十 = 孛
- ⠳⠤⠼ - る/忄 + 宿 + ろ/十 = 悖
- ⡷⠤⣾ - て/扌 + 宿 + め/目 = 攪
- ⣅⠤⢼ - 日 + 宿 + そ/馬 = 曚
- ⠣⠤⢼ - ら/月 + 宿 + そ/馬 = 朦
- ⢇⠤⣜ - き/木 + 宿 + ほ/方 = 榜
- ⢥⠤⢼ - 心 + 宿 + そ/馬 = 檬
- ⡇⠤⣜ - に/氵 + 宿 + ほ/方 = 滂
- ⢱⠤⢚ - 氷/氵 + 宿 + く/艹 = 濛
- ⣷⠤⢼ - め/目 + 宿 + そ/馬 = 矇
- ⣣⠤⣜ - ま/石 + 宿 + ほ/方 = 磅
- ⢅⠤⣜ - ⺼ + 宿 + ほ/方 = 膀
- ⣓⠤⢚ - ふ/女 + 宿 + く/艹 = 艨
- ⢓⠤⢼ - く/艹 + 宿 + そ/馬 = 蒙
- ⣳⠤⣪ - む/車 + 宿 + ま/石 = 蠧
- ⠓⠤⢼ - う/宀/# + 宿 + そ/馬 = 騫
- ⠥⠤⢾ - 宿 + 宿 + せ/食 = 鶤
- ⣱⠤⢾ - 火 + 宿 + せ/食 = 鶯
- ⠥⢒⢮ - 宿 + く/艹 + し/巿 = 冪
- ⠥⠐⣎ - 宿 + selector 4 + ひ/辶 = 皸
- ⠥⠤⢾ - 宿 + 宿 + せ/食 = 鶤

==== Compounds of 与 and 與 ====
- ⡑⠤⠘ - や/疒 + 宿 + selector 4 = 嶼
- ⣡⠤⠘ - ん/止 + 宿 + selector 4 = 歟
- ⣡⠤⣼ - ん/止 + 宿 + も/門 = 丐
- ⠧⠤⣼ - り/分 + 宿 + も/門 = 兮
- ⡓⠤⢞ - ぬ/力 + 宿 + け/犬 = 刳
- ⠳⠤⢞ - る/忄 + 宿 + け/犬 = 愕
- ⣷⠤⠚ - め/目 + 宿 + う/宀/# = 眄
- ⡧⠤⣨ - ち/竹 + 宿 + ん/止 = 篶
- ⣧⠤⡪ - み/耳 + 宿 + た/⽥ = 聘
- ⢅⠤⢞ - ⺼ + 宿 + け/犬 = 胯
- ⢳⠤⣼ - す/発 + 宿 + も/門 = 虧
- ⡗⠤⢞ - ね/示 + 宿 + け/犬 = 袴
- ⠗⠤⣼ - え/訁 + 宿 + も/門 = 諡
- ⠗⠤⢞ - え/訁 + 宿 + け/犬 = 諤
- ⣧⠤⢞ - み/耳 + 宿 + け/犬 = 跨
- ⣳⠤⣬ - む/車 + 宿 + 囗 = 輿
- ⣓⠤⣼ - ふ/女 + 宿 + も/門 = 娉
- ⢳⠤⣨ - す/発 + 宿 + ん/止 = 麪

==== Compounds of 中 ====
- ⡃⠬ - な/亻 + 宿 = 仲
  - ⡃⠤⠺ - な/亻 + 宿 + る/忄 = 僂
- ⡇⠬ - に/氵 + 宿 = 沖
  - ⡇⠤⡨ - に/氵 + 宿 + を/貝 = 潰
  - ⡇⡆⠬ - に/氵 + に/氵 + 宿 = 冲
- ⠥⢬ - 宿 + 心 = 忠
- ⢗⠰⠬ - け/犬 + 比 + 宿 = 狆
- ⣇⠰⠬ - ひ/辶 + 比 + 宿 = 迚
- ⠷⠤⣬ - れ/口 + 宿 + 囗 = 串
- ⡑⠤⠺ - や/疒 + 宿 + る/忄 = 瘻
- ⡗⠤⠺ - ね/示 + 宿 + る/忄 = 褸
- ⢃⠤⠺ - か/金 + 宿 + る/忄 = 鏤
- ⡧⠤⢨ - ち/竹 + 宿 + 数 = 籔
- ⣳⠤⠺ - む/車 + 宿 + る/忄 = 螻

==== Compounds of 介 ====
- ⡣⠬ - た/⽥ + 宿 = 界
  - ⡳⡢⠬ - つ/土 + た/⽥ + 宿 = 堺
- ⠧⢐⠬ - り/分 + 仁/亻 + 宿 = 个
- ⡃⢐⠬ - な/亻 + 仁/亻 + 宿 = 价
- ⡣⢐⠬ - た/⽥ + 仁/亻 + 宿 = 畍
- ⡑⢐⠬ - や/疒 + 仁/亻 + 宿 = 疥

==== Compounds of 兆 ====
- ⢥⠬ - 心 + 宿 = 桃
- ⡥⠬ - ゑ/訁 + 宿 = 誂
- ⣧⠬ - み/耳 + 宿 = 跳
- ⣇⠬ - ひ/辶 + 宿 = 逃
- ⡃⢠⠬ - な/亻 + 数 + 宿 = 佻
- ⡷⢠⠬ - て/扌 + 数 + 宿 = 挑
- ⣅⢠⠬ - 日 + 数 + 宿 = 晁
- ⠓⢠⠬ - う/宀/# + 数 + 宿 = 窕
- ⢃⢠⠬ - か/金 + 数 + 宿 = 銚
- ⣓⠤⠬ - ふ/女 + 宿 + 宿 = 姚
- ⣓⠤⠬ - ふ/女 + 宿 + 宿 = 姚

==== Compounds of 争 ====
- ⢷⠬ - せ/食 + 宿 = 静
  - ⡇⢶⠬ - に/氵 + せ/食 + 宿 = 瀞
  - ⢷⢶⠬ - せ/食 + せ/食 + 宿 = 靜
- ⢵⢴⠬ - そ/馬 + そ/馬 + 宿 = 爭
  - ⡑⢴⠬ - や/疒 + そ/馬 + 宿 = 崢
  - ⡧⢴⠬ - ち/竹 + そ/馬 + 宿 = 箏
- ⠗⢴⠬ - え/訁 + そ/馬 + 宿 = 諍
- ⢃⢴⠬ - か/金 + そ/馬 + 宿 = 錚

==== Non-compounding ====
For many kantenji, a middle cell of ⠤ serves only to distinguish between two-cell patterns that could be interpreted in multiple ways, e.g. ⢱⡎ = 淫, while ⢱⠤⡎ = 冰.

- ⡃⠤⠼ - な/亻 + 宿 + ろ/十 = 什
- ⡃⠤⡚ - な/亻 + 宿 + ぬ/力 = 仂
- ⡃⠤⡼ - な/亻 + 宿 + と/戸 = 仆
- ⡃⠤⢘ - な/亻 + 宿 + 仁/亻 = 从
- ⡃⠤⣺ - な/亻 + 宿 + む/車 = 俥
- ⡃⠤⣼ - な/亻 + 宿 + も/門 = 們
- ⢱⠤⡎ - 氷/氵 + 宿 + に/氵 = 冰
- ⢃⠤⡚ - か/金 + 宿 + ぬ/力 = 劉
- ⠷⠤⠼ - れ/口 + 宿 + ろ/十 = 叶
- ⢗⠤⠾ - け/犬 + 宿 + れ/口 = 吠
- ⠷⠤⠮ - れ/口 + 宿 + り/分 = 吩
- ⠷⠤⢎ - れ/口 + 宿 + き/木 = 呆
- ⠷⠤⢪ - れ/口 + 宿 + さ/阝 = 咋
- ⠷⠤⡌ - れ/口 + 宿 + ゐ/幺 = 咳
- ⠷⠤⣘ - れ/口 + 宿 + ゆ/彳 = 哘
- ⠷⠤⢞ - れ/口 + 宿 + け/犬 = 哭
- ⡳⠤⡺ - つ/土 + 宿 + つ/土 = 圭
- ⡳⠤⣘ - つ/土 + 宿 + ゆ/彳 = 垳
- ⢗⠤⠼ - け/犬 + 宿 + ろ/十 = 夲
- ⢗⠤⡺ - け/犬 + 宿 + つ/土 = 奎
- ⣓⠤⢞ - ふ/女 + 宿 + け/犬 = 妖
- ⣗⠤⣚ - へ/⺩ + 宿 + ふ/女 = 妝
- ⣓⠤⣪ - ふ/女 + 宿 + ま/石 = 妬
- ⢵⠤⣚ - そ/馬 + 宿 + ふ/女 = 姜
- ⣓⠤⡺ - ふ/女 + 宿 + つ/土 = 娃
- ⡵⠤⡨ - と/戸 + 宿 + を/貝 = 屓
- ⡑⠤⢊ - や/疒 + 宿 + か/金 = 崟
- ⡱⠤⢼ - よ/广 + 宿 + そ/馬 = 庠
- ⣑⠤⣮ - ゆ/彳 + 宿 + み/耳 = 弭
- ⣑⠤⣜ - ゆ/彳 + 宿 + ほ/方 = 彷
- ⣑⠤⣨ - ゆ/彳 + 宿 + ん/止 = 徙
- ⠧⠤⢬ - り/分 + 宿 + 心 = 忿
- ⠳⠤⡚ - る/忄 + 宿 + ぬ/力 = 恊
- ⡳⠤⢬ - つ/土 + 宿 + 心 = 恚
- ⡵⠤⣞ - と/戸 + 宿 + へ/⺩ = 扁
- ⡷⠤⠮ - て/扌 + 宿 + り/分 = 扮
- ⡷⠤⡺ - て/扌 + 宿 + つ/土 = 挂
- ⡷⠤⣼ - て/扌 + 宿 + も/門 = 捫
- ⡷⠤⢼ - て/扌 + 宿 + そ/馬 = 掾
- ⣵⠤⢸ - も/門 + 宿 + 氷/氵 = 攷
- ⣣⠤⡨ - ま/石 + 宿 + を/貝 = 斫
- ⢇⠤⡨ - き/木 + 宿 + を/貝 = 斯
- ⣅⠤⣈ - 日 + 宿 + 龸 = 晄
- ⢇⠤⡼ - き/木 + 宿 + と/戸 = 朴
- ⢇⠤⢊ - き/木 + 宿 + か/金 = 杆
- ⢥⠤⢜ - 心 + 宿 + こ/子 = 李
- ⢇⠤⢜ - き/木 + 宿 + こ/子 = 杠
- ⣅⠤⢎ - 日 + 宿 + き/木 = 杲
- ⢥⠤⣜ - 心 + 宿 + ほ/方 = 枋
- ⢥⠤⢪ - 心 + 宿 + さ/阝 = 柞
- ⢇⠤⣞ - き/木 + 宿 + へ/⺩ = 柵
- ⢥⠤⡺ - 心 + 宿 + つ/土 = 桂
- ⢥⠤⠎ - 心 + 宿 + い/糹/# = 椎
- ⣕⠤⢞ - ほ/方 + 宿 + け/犬 = 殀
- ⡇⠤⢪ - に/氵 + 宿 + さ/阝 = 氾
- ⡇⠤⠼ - に/氵 + 宿 + ろ/十 = 汁
- ⢱⠤⡺ - 氷/氵 + 宿 + つ/土 = 汢
- ⢱⠤⣌ - 氷/氵 + 宿 + 日 = 汨
- ⡇⠤⠮ - に/氵 + 宿 + り/分 = 汾
- ⡇⠤⢬ - に/氵 + 宿 + 心 = 沁
- ⡇⠤⢞ - に/氵 + 宿 + け/犬 = 沃
- ⡇⠤⢎ - に/氵 + 宿 + き/木 = 沐
- ⡇⠤⢮ - に/氵 + 宿 + し/巿 = 沛
- ⡇⠤⡪ - に/氵 + 宿 + た/⽥ = 沺
- ⡇⠤⣾ - に/氵 + 宿 + め/目 = 泪
- ⡇⠤⡎ - に/氵 + 宿 + に/氵 = 洒
- ⢱⠤⢊ - 氷/氵 + 宿 + か/金 = 淦
- ⡇⠤⠺ - に/氵 + 宿 + る/忄 = 淪
- ⡇⠤⠎ - に/氵 + 宿 + い/糹/# = 淮
- ⡇⠤⢊ - に/氵 + 宿 + か/金 = 渦
- ⢱⠤⡚ - 氷/氵 + 宿 + ぬ/力 = 滔
- ⣱⠤⢪ - 火 + 宿 + さ/阝 = 炸
- ⣱⠤⢼ - 火 + 宿 + そ/馬 = 燹
- ⢗⠤⣸ - け/犬 + 宿 + 火 = 狄
- ⢗⠤⡨ - け/犬 + 宿 + を/貝 = 狽
- ⣗⠤⣮ - へ/⺩ + 宿 + み/耳 = 珥
- ⣗⠤⡺ - へ/⺩ + 宿 + つ/土 = 珪
- ⣗⠤⠸ - へ/⺩ + 宿 + 比 = 琵
- ⣗⠤⣎ - へ/⺩ + 宿 + ひ/辶 = 琶
- ⣗⠤⢼ - へ/⺩ + 宿 + そ/馬 = 瑪
- ⣗⠤⢊ - へ/⺩ + 宿 + か/金 = 瑶
- ⡣⠤⢸ - た/⽥ + 宿 + 氷/氵 = 畋
- ⡣⠤⠚ - た/⽥ + 宿 + う/宀/# = 畛
- ⡑⠤⢘ - や/疒 + 宿 + 仁/亻 = 疣
- ⡑⠤⠚ - や/疒 + 宿 + う/宀/# = 疹
- ⡑⠤⢼ - や/疒 + 宿 + そ/馬 = 疽
- ⡑⠤⡘ - や/疒 + 宿 + や/疒 = 痕
- ⢃⠤⢌ - か/金 + 宿 + ⺼ = 盂
- ⢵⠤⠪ - そ/馬 + 宿 + ら/月 = 盖
- ⣷⠤⣼ - め/目 + 宿 + も/門 = 盻
- ⣷⠤⠸ - め/目 + 宿 + 比 = 眥
- ⣷⠤⢞ - め/目 + 宿 + け/犬 = 眷
- ⣷⠤⢚ - め/目 + 宿 + く/艹 = 瞿
- ⣣⠤⠸ - ま/石 + 宿 + 比 = 砒
- ⣣⠤⡺ - ま/石 + 宿 + つ/土 = 硅
- ⢇⠤⣪ - き/木 + 宿 + ま/石 = 碁
- ⣣⠤⠎ - ま/石 + 宿 + い/糹/# = 碓
- ⡗⠤⢎ - ね/示 + 宿 + き/木 = 祀
- ⡗⠤⣨ - ね/示 + 宿 + ん/止 = 祗
- ⡗⠤⢪ - ね/示 + 宿 + さ/阝 = 祚
- ⡕⠤⣈ - の/禾 + 宿 + 龸 = 禿
- ⡕⠤⠸ - の/禾 + 宿 + 比 = 秕
- ⠓⠤⢪ - う/宀/# + 宿 + さ/阝 = 窄
- ⣣⠤⠼ - ま/石 + 宿 + ろ/十 = 竍
- ⣣⠤⢾ - ま/石 + 宿 + せ/食 = 竓
- ⣣⠤⠮ - ま/石 + 宿 + り/分 = 竕
- ⣣⠤⡼ - ま/石 + 宿 + と/戸 = 站
- ⡧⠤⠎ - ち/竹 + 宿 + い/糹/# = 竺
- ⡧⠤⡼ - ち/竹 + 宿 + と/戸 = 笄
- ⡕⠤⠼ - の/禾 + 宿 + ろ/十 = 籵
- ⠇⠤⡨ - い/糹/# + 宿 + を/貝 = 糺
- ⠇⠤⠸ - い/糹/# + 宿 + 比 = 紕
- ⠇⠤⠞ - い/糹/# + 宿 + え/訁 = 紜
- ⠇⠤⣘ - い/糹/# + 宿 + ゆ/彳 = 絎
- ⠇⠤⠺ - い/糹/# + 宿 + る/忄 = 綸
- ⢵⠤⣨ - そ/馬 + 宿 + ん/止 = 羝
- ⢵⠤⢼ - そ/馬 + 宿 + そ/馬 = 羞
- ⢕⠤⣎ - こ/子 + 宿 + ひ/辶 = 耙
- ⢕⠤⠪ - こ/子 + 宿 + ら/月 = 耜
- ⣧⠤⣨ - み/耳 + 宿 + ん/止 = 耻
- ⣧⠤⢪ - み/耳 + 宿 + さ/阝 = 聊
- ⢅⠤⡺ - ⺼ + 宿 + つ/土 = 肚
- ⢅⠤⢪ - ⺼ + 宿 + さ/阝 = 胙
- ⢅⠤⡸ - ⺼ + 宿 + よ/广 = 胥
- ⢅⠤⡼ - ⺼ + 宿 + と/戸 = 胼
- ⢅⠤⠮ - ⺼ + 宿 + り/分 = 臉
- ⣗⠤⢺ - へ/⺩ + 宿 + す/発 = 臧
- ⡓⠤⡼ - ぬ/力 + 宿 + と/戸 = 舁
- ⣓⠤⣜ - ふ/女 + 宿 + ほ/方 = 舫
- ⣓⠤⡼ - ふ/女 + 宿 + と/戸 = 舮
- ⢥⠤⡼ - 心 + 宿 + と/戸 = 芦
- ⢓⠤⠮ - く/艹 + 宿 + り/分 = 芬
- ⢥⠤⣎ - 心 + 宿 + ひ/辶 = 芭
- ⢓⠤⢬ - く/艹 + 宿 + 心 = 芯
- ⢓⠤⢞ - く/艹 + 宿 + け/犬 = 萼
- ⢥⠤⡞ - 心 + 宿 + ね/示 = 蒜
- ⣳⠤⣾ - む/車 + 宿 + め/目 = 蠅
- ⣳⠤⢼ - む/車 + 宿 + そ/馬 = 蠡
- ⣳⠤⢌ - む/車 + 宿 + ⺼ = 蠱
- ⣑⠤⣘ - ゆ/彳 + 宿 + ゆ/彳 = 衍
- ⡗⠤⠚ - ね/示 + 宿 + う/宀/# = 衫
- ⡗⠤⣌ - ね/示 + 宿 + 日 = 衵
- ⡗⠤⡾ - ね/示 + 宿 + て/扌 = 袂
- ⡗⠤⡺ - ね/示 + 宿 + つ/土 = 袿
- ⡗⠤⣘ - ね/示 + 宿 + ゆ/彳 = 裄
- ⡗⠤⠾ - ね/示 + 宿 + れ/口 = 褝
- ⠗⠤⢊ - え/訁 + 宿 + か/金 = 訐
- ⠗⠤⣎ - え/訁 + 宿 + ひ/辶 = 詑
- ⠗⠤⡺ - え/訁 + 宿 + つ/土 = 誦
- ⠗⠤⡚ - え/訁 + 宿 + ぬ/力 = 諂
- ⢵⠤⠸ - そ/馬 + 宿 + 比 = 豼
- ⡡⠤⣬ - を/貝 + 宿 + 囗 = 賤
- ⡡⠤⡨ - を/貝 + 宿 + を/貝 = 贔
- ⣃⠤⠚ - は/辶 + 宿 + う/宀/# = 趁
- ⣧⠤⣪ - み/耳 + 宿 + ま/石 = 跖
- ⣧⠤⣞ - み/耳 + 宿 + へ/⺩ = 跚
- ⣧⠤⡚ - み/耳 + 宿 + ぬ/力 = 蹈
- ⣳⠤⡨ - む/車 + 宿 + を/貝 = 軋
- ⣳⠤⣘ - む/車 + 宿 + ゆ/彳 = 輊
- ⣳⠤⣜ - む/車 + 宿 + ほ/方 = 輔
- ⣃⠤⢊ - は/辶 + 宿 + か/金 = 迂
- ⣇⠤⡼ - ひ/辶 + 宿 + と/戸 = 迸
- ⣇⠤⠞ - ひ/辶 + 宿 + え/訁 = 迹
- ⡃⠤⢪ - な/亻 + 宿 + さ/阝 = 那
- ⢣⠤⢞ - さ/阝 + 宿 + け/犬 = 鄂
- ⢣⠤⣼ - さ/阝 + 宿 + も/門 = 鄒
- ⢃⠤⡮ - か/金 + 宿 + ち/竹 = 釡
- ⢃⠤⠾ - か/金 + 宿 + れ/口 = 釦
- ⢃⠤⣼ - か/金 + 宿 + も/門 = 鈞
- ⢃⠤⡼ - か/金 + 宿 + と/戸 = 鈩
- ⢃⠤⣎ - か/金 + 宿 + ひ/辶 = 鉈
- ⢃⠤⢪ - か/金 + 宿 + さ/阝 = 鉚
- ⢃⠤⣜ - か/金 + 宿 + ほ/方 = 鋪
- ⢃⠤⢞ - か/金 + 宿 + け/犬 = 鍔
- ⢃⠤⠬ - か/金 + 宿 + 宿 = 鏥
- ⣵⠤⡎ - も/門 + 宿 + に/氵 = 閖
- ⣵⠤⢜ - も/門 + 宿 + こ/子 = 閘
- ⣵⠤⡚ - も/門 + 宿 + ぬ/力 = 閻
- ⣵⠤⣎ - も/門 + 宿 + ひ/辶 = 闌
- ⣵⠤⢼ - も/門 + 宿 + そ/馬 = 闖
- ⢣⠤⣨ - さ/阝 + 宿 + ん/止 = 阯
- ⢣⠤⣎ - さ/阝 + 宿 + ひ/辶 = 陀
- ⠇⠤⠼ - い/糹/# + 宿 + ろ/十 = 隼
- ⡑⠤⢾ - や/疒 + 宿 + せ/食 = 雉
- ⣷⠤⠎ - め/目 + 宿 + い/糹/# = 雎
- ⡵⠤⡺ - と/戸 + 宿 + つ/土 = 鞋
- ⠕⠤⢺ - お/頁 + 宿 + す/発 = 頤
- ⠕⠤⣮ - お/頁 + 宿 + み/耳 = 顳
- ⢷⠤⡮ - せ/食 + 宿 + ち/竹 = 餃
- ⢷⠤⡚ - せ/食 + 宿 + ぬ/力 = 餡
- ⢷⠤⣸ - せ/食 + 宿 + 火 = 餤
- ⢵⠤⡬ - そ/馬 + 宿 + ゑ/訁 = 馭
- ⢵⠤⣎ - そ/馬 + 宿 + ひ/辶 = 駝
- ⢷⠤⣜ - せ/食 + 宿 + ほ/方 = 魴
- ⢷⠤⢪ - せ/食 + 宿 + さ/阝 = 鮓
- ⡷⠤⢾ - て/扌 + 宿 + せ/食 = 鴃
- ⢱⠤⢾ - 氷/氵 + 宿 + せ/食 = 鴆
- ⣷⠤⢾ - め/目 + 宿 + せ/食 = 鴉
- ⠵⠤⢾ - ろ/十 + 宿 + せ/食 = 鴒
- ⣡⠤⢾ - ん/止 + 宿 + せ/食 = 鴟
- ⠕⠤⢾ - お/頁 + 宿 + せ/食 = 鴦
- ⠓⠤⢾ - う/宀/# + 宿 + せ/食 = 鴪
- ⡣⠤⢾ - た/⽥ + 宿 + せ/食 = 鴫
- ⡧⠤⢾ - ち/竹 + 宿 + せ/食 = 鵁
- ⠇⠤⢾ - い/糹/# + 宿 + せ/食 = 鷦
- ⢧⠤⣜ - し/巿 + 宿 + ほ/方 = 黼
- ⡕⠤⣾ - の/禾 + 宿 + め/目 = 龝
- ⢓⠤⢨ - く/艹 + 宿 + 数 = 薮
- ⢃⠤⣮ - か/金 + 宿 + み/耳 = 鑷
- ⣣⠤⣪ - ま/石 + 宿 + ま/石 = 碚
- ⡃⠤⣊ - な/亻 + 宿 + は/辶 = 伎
- ⢑⠤⡺ - 仁/亻 + 宿 + つ/土 = 俑
- ⡃⠤⢸ - な/亻 + 宿 + 氷/氵 = 偈
- ⡃⠤⣘ - な/亻 + 宿 + ゆ/彳 = 偸
- ⡃⠤⡾ - な/亻 + 宿 + て/扌 = 傅
- ⣥⠤⠞ - 囗 + 宿 + え/訁 = 冏
- ⣅⠤⣾ - 日 + 宿 + め/目 = 冐
- ⢱⠤⣾ - 氷/氵 + 宿 + め/目 = 冴
- ⡓⠤⡾ - ぬ/力 + 宿 + て/扌 = 刔
- ⡓⠤⢜ - ぬ/力 + 宿 + こ/子 = 刧
- ⡓⠤⣞ - ぬ/力 + 宿 + へ/⺩ = 刪
- ⡓⠤⡘ - ぬ/力 + 宿 + や/疒 = 剴
- ⢗⠤⡚ - け/犬 + 宿 + ぬ/力 = 勁
- ⡵⠤⡚ - と/戸 + 宿 + ぬ/力 = 勒
- ⡳⠤⡼ - つ/土 + 宿 + と/戸 = 卦
- ⡱⠤⢪ - よ/广 + 宿 + さ/阝 = 卮
- ⢣⠤⡪ - さ/阝 + 宿 + た/⽥ = 卻
- ⠷⠤⠎ - れ/口 + 宿 + い/糹/# = 售
- ⠷⠤⡚ - れ/口 + 宿 + ぬ/力 = 啗
- ⠷⠤⢸ - れ/口 + 宿 + 氷/氵 = 喝
- ⠷⠤⢼ - れ/口 + 宿 + そ/馬 = 噌
- ⠷⠤⢾ - れ/口 + 宿 + せ/食 = 嚥
- ⣥⠤⣜ - 囗 + 宿 + ほ/方 = 圃
- ⣥⠤⠎ - 囗 + 宿 + い/糹/# = 圍
- ⣥⠤⠺ - 囗 + 宿 + る/忄 = 圜
- ⡳⠤⡘ - つ/土 + 宿 + や/疒 = 垠
- ⡳⠤⣜ - つ/土 + 宿 + ほ/方 = 埔
- ⡳⠤⢊ - つ/土 + 宿 + か/金 = 堝
- ⡳⠤⣌ - つ/土 + 宿 + 日 = 堵
- ⢗⠤⡼ - け/犬 + 宿 + と/戸 = 套
- ⣓⠤⢼ - ふ/女 + 宿 + そ/馬 = 媽
- ⣓⠤⣺ - ふ/女 + 宿 + む/車 = 媾
- ⡵⠤⢜ - と/戸 + 宿 + こ/子 = 孱
- ⢗⠤⠚ - け/犬 + 宿 + う/宀/# = 尨
- ⡵⠤⡼ - と/戸 + 宿 + と/戸 = 屏
- ⡑⠤⣬ - や/疒 + 宿 + 囗 = 峩
- ⡱⠤⣎ - よ/广 + 宿 + ひ/辶 = 巵
- ⢧⠤⡼ - し/巿 + 宿 + と/戸 = 帖
- ⢧⠤⠎ - し/巿 + 宿 + い/糹/# = 幃
- ⣑⠤⣺ - ゆ/彳 + 宿 + む/車 = 弘
- ⣑⠤⣈ - ゆ/彳 + 宿 + 龸 = 弥
- ⣑⠤⡪ - ゆ/彳 + 宿 + た/⽥ = 彊
- ⢗⠤⢺ - け/犬 + 宿 + す/発 = 彗
- ⣑⠤⣾ - ゆ/彳 + 宿 + め/目 = 彿
- ⣑⠤⡘ - ゆ/彳 + 宿 + や/疒 = 很
- ⠳⠤⣾ - る/忄 + 宿 + め/目 = 怫
- ⡧⠤⢬ - ち/竹 + 宿 + 心 = 悉
- ⠳⠤⢺ - る/忄 + 宿 + す/発 = 愎
- ⠳⠤⡾ - る/忄 + 宿 + て/扌 = 慱
- ⠕⠤⣬ - お/頁 + 宿 + 囗 = 戛
- ⣵⠤⣬ - も/門 + 宿 + 囗 = 戡
- ⡷⠤⢘ - て/扌 + 宿 + 仁/亻 = 托
- ⡷⠤⢊ - て/扌 + 宿 + か/金 = 扞
- ⡷⠤⡪ - て/扌 + 宿 + た/⽥ = 扣
- ⡷⠤⡾ - て/扌 + 宿 + て/扌 = 抉
- ⡷⠤⣎ - て/扌 + 宿 + ひ/辶 = 把
- ⡷⠤⡊ - て/扌 + 宿 + な/亻 = 挟
- ⡷⠤⠼ - て/扌 + 宿 + ろ/十 = 撩
- ⡷⠤⢜ - て/扌 + 宿 + こ/子 = 撰
- ⡷⠤⢎ - て/扌 + 宿 + き/木 = 擒
- ⡷⠤⡘ - て/扌 + 宿 + や/疒 = 擢
- ⣅⠤⡸ - 日 + 宿 + よ/广 = 昿
- ⢇⠤⣬ - き/木 + 宿 + 囗 = 桟
- ⢇⠤⡺ - き/木 + 宿 + つ/土 = 桶
- ⢇⠤⢾ - き/木 + 宿 + せ/食 = 梟
- ⢇⠤⣺ - き/木 + 宿 + む/車 = 梭
- ⢇⠤⠺ - き/木 + 宿 + る/忄 = 棆
- ⢥⠤⣾ - 心 + 宿 + め/目 = 棉
- ⢇⠤⢎ - き/木 + 宿 + き/木 = 棋
- ⢇⠤⠪ - き/木 + 宿 + ら/月 = 楕
- ⢥⠤⢎ - 心 + 宿 + き/木 = 槿
- ⢥⠤⡪ - 心 + 宿 + た/⽥ = 橿
- ⢇⠤⡘ - き/木 + 宿 + や/疒 = 櫂
- ⣕⠤⠚ - ほ/方 + 宿 + う/宀/# = 殄
- ⣕⠤⣪ - ほ/方 + 宿 + ま/石 = 殕
- ⡇⠤⡊ - に/氵 + 宿 + な/亻 = 浹
- ⡇⠤⡚ - に/氵 + 宿 + ぬ/力 = 淵
- ⡇⠤⡸ - に/氵 + 宿 + よ/广 = 渫
- ⡇⠤⢘ - に/氵 + 宿 + 仁/亻 = 湲
- ⡇⠤⢺ - に/氵 + 宿 + す/発 = 溌
- ⡇⠤⠞ - に/氵 + 宿 + え/訁 = 溲
- ⡇⠤⣈ - に/氵 + 宿 + 龸 = 滾
- ⣱⠤⣬ - 火 + 宿 + 囗 = 炯
- ⣱⠤⣜ - 火 + 宿 + ほ/方 = 烽
- ⣱⠤⡚ - 火 + 宿 + ぬ/力 = 焔
- ⣱⠤⢘ - 火 + 宿 + 仁/亻 = 煖
- ⢓⠤⣸ - く/艹 + 宿 + 火 = 熏
- ⣱⠤⡘ - 火 + 宿 + や/疒 = 燿
- ⣗⠤⣬ - へ/⺩ + 宿 + 囗 = 牋
- ⣗⠤⡸ - へ/⺩ + 宿 + よ/广 = 牒
- ⢵⠤⣾ - そ/馬 + 宿 + め/目 = 牝
- ⢵⠤⠜ - そ/馬 + 宿 + お/頁 = 牡
- ⢗⠤⢘ - け/犬 + 宿 + 仁/亻 = 犹
- ⢗⠤⣾ - け/犬 + 宿 + め/目 = 狒
- ⣗⠤⣞ - へ/⺩ + 宿 + へ/⺩ = 珊
- ⣗⠤⣈ - へ/⺩ + 宿 + 龸 = 珎
- ⣗⠤⡜ - へ/⺩ + 宿 + の/禾 = 瑕
- ⣗⠤⡮ - へ/⺩ + 宿 + ち/竹 = 瑙
- ⣗⠤⡨ - へ/⺩ + 宿 + を/貝 = 瑣
- ⣗⠤⢎ - へ/⺩ + 宿 + き/木 = 瑾
- ⣗⠤⡊ - へ/⺩ + 宿 + な/亻 = 璞
- ⣵⠤⡪ - も/門 + 宿 + た/⽥ = 甸
- ⢗⠤⡪ - け/犬 + 宿 + た/⽥ = 畚
- ⡣⠤⣞ - た/⽥ + 宿 + へ/⺩ = 畴
- ⡑⠤⢺ - や/疒 + 宿 + す/発 = 癈
- ⡳⠤⢌ - つ/土 + 宿 + ⺼ = 盍
- ⣥⠤⢌ - 囗 + 宿 + ⺼ = 盞
- ⣣⠤⢸ - ま/石 + 宿 + 氷/氵 = 碣
- ⣣⠤⡮ - ま/石 + 宿 + ち/竹 = 碯
- ⣑⠤⡜ - ゆ/彳 + 宿 + の/禾 = 粥
- ⠇⠤⣬ - い/糹/# + 宿 + 囗 = 絨
- ⡅⠤⢜ - ゐ/幺 + 宿 + こ/子 = 絳
- ⠇⠤⡼ - い/糹/# + 宿 + と/戸 = 綯
- ⠇⠤⡮ - い/糹/# + 宿 + ち/竹 = 綵
- ⠇⠤⢺ - い/糹/# + 宿 + す/発 = 綾
- ⠇⠤⡸ - い/糹/# + 宿 + よ/广 = 緤
- ⡅⠤⠼ - ゐ/幺 + 宿 + ろ/十 = 繚
- ⠇⠤⢪ - い/糹/# + 宿 + さ/阝 = 纃
- ⢅⠤⡾ - ⺼ + 宿 + て/扌 = 膊
- ⢓⠤⠪ - く/艹 + 宿 + ら/月 = 臈
- ⣓⠤⠞ - ふ/女 + 宿 + え/訁 = 艘
- ⣓⠤⣌ - ふ/女 + 宿 + 日 = 艪
- ⢓⠤⡘ - く/艹 + 宿 + や/疒 = 艱
- ⢓⠤⠚ - く/艹 + 宿 + う/宀/# = 苑
- ⢓⠤⡊ - く/艹 + 宿 + な/亻 = 莢
- ⢥⠤⣪ - 心 + 宿 + ま/石 = 菩
- ⢥⠤⢊ - 心 + 宿 + か/金 = 萵
- ⢥⠤⣘ - 心 + 宿 + ゆ/彳 = 萸
- ⣳⠤⢸ - む/車 + 宿 + 氷/氵 = 蝎
- ⣳⠤⡜ - む/車 + 宿 + の/禾 = 蝦
- ⣳⠤⢨ - む/車 + 宿 + 数 = 蝪
- ⣳⠤⢺ - む/車 + 宿 + す/発 = 蝮
- ⣳⠤⢊ - む/車 + 宿 + か/金 = 蝸
- ⣥⠤⢜ - 囗 + 宿 + こ/子 = 觚
- ⠗⠤⠎ - え/訁 + 宿 + い/糹/# = 諱
- ⠗⠤⢚ - え/訁 + 宿 + く/艹 = 謨
- ⣃⠤⢪ - は/辶 + 宿 + さ/阝 = 赳
- ⣧⠤⣘ - み/耳 + 宿 + ゆ/彳 = 踰
- ⣧⠤⣾ - み/耳 + 宿 + め/目 = 蹣
- ⣧⠤⡊ - み/耳 + 宿 + な/亻 = 蹼
- ⣳⠤⠞ - む/車 + 宿 + え/訁 = 轅
- ⣇⠤⢞ - ひ/辶 + 宿 + け/犬 = 逕
- ⣇⠤⣘ - ひ/辶 + 宿 + ゆ/彳 = 逾
- ⣇⠤⢸ - ひ/辶 + 宿 + 氷/氵 = 遏
- ⣇⠤⡜ - ひ/辶 + 宿 + の/禾 = 遐
- ⣇⠤⢊ - ひ/辶 + 宿 + か/金 = 遥
- ⣇⠤⠼ - ひ/辶 + 宿 + ろ/十 = 遼
- ⣇⠤⣬ - ひ/辶 + 宿 + 囗 = 邇
- ⢷⠤⡜ - せ/食 + 宿 + の/禾 = 酘
- ⢷⠤⡌ - せ/食 + 宿 + ゐ/幺 = 酳
- ⢷⠤⢺ - せ/食 + 宿 + す/発 = 醗
- ⢃⠤⡊ - か/金 + 宿 + な/亻 = 鋏
- ⢃⠤⢊ - か/金 + 宿 + か/金 = 鍋
- ⢃⠤⣘ - か/金 + 宿 + ゆ/彳 = 鍮
- ⢃⠤⡘ - か/金 + 宿 + や/疒 = 鎧
- ⢣⠤⡊ - さ/阝 + 宿 + な/亻 = 陜
- ⢣⠤⠪ - さ/阝 + 宿 + ら/月 = 隋
- ⡵⠤⢸ - と/戸 + 宿 + 氷/氵 = 鞨
- ⡵⠤⣎ - と/戸 + 宿 + ひ/辶 = 鞴
- ⠵⠤⠎ - ろ/十 + 宿 + い/糹/# = 韓
- ⠇⠤⡚ - い/糹/# + 宿 + ぬ/力 = 韜
- ⣣⠤⣼ - ま/石 + 宿 + も/門 = 韵
- ⠕⠤⢞ - お/頁 + 宿 + け/犬 = 顴
- ⡓⠤⢾ - ぬ/力 + 宿 + せ/食 = 飭
- ⢷⠤⣬ - せ/食 + 宿 + 囗 = 餞
- ⢷⠤⢜ - せ/食 + 宿 + こ/子 = 饌
- ⢵⠤⠎ - そ/馬 + 宿 + い/糹/# = 騅
- ⠕⠤⡼ - お/頁 + 宿 + と/戸 = 魁
- ⢷⠤⡸ - せ/食 + 宿 + よ/广 = 鰈
- ⣳⠤⢾ - む/車 + 宿 + せ/食 = 鳳
- ⡵⠤⢾ - と/戸 + 宿 + せ/食 = 鳶
- ⣓⠤⢾ - ふ/女 + 宿 + せ/食 = 鵐
- ⠣⠤⢾ - ら/月 + 宿 + せ/食 = 鵑
- ⣇⠤⢾ - ひ/辶 + 宿 + せ/食 = 鶸
- ⢑⠤⢾ - 仁/亻 + 宿 + せ/食 = 鶺
- ⢃⠤⢾ - か/金 + 宿 + せ/食 = 鶻
- ⢗⠤⢾ - け/犬 + 宿 + せ/食 = 鸛
- ⣡⠤⠮ - ん/止 + 宿 + り/分 = 鹸
- ⢕⠤⢼ - こ/子 + 宿 + そ/馬 = 麑
- ⢇⠤⢼ - き/木 + 宿 + そ/馬 = 麒
- ⡕⠤⢼ - の/禾 + 宿 + そ/馬 = 麟
- ⢳⠤⢞ - す/発 + 宿 + け/犬 = 麩
- ⢇⣲⠬ - き/木 + む/車 + 宿 = 凩
- ⡓⡴⠬ - ぬ/力 + と/戸 + 宿 = 剳
- ⡷⡴⠬ - て/扌 + と/戸 + 宿 = 搭

==== Other compounds ====
- ⣑⠬ - ゆ/彳 + 宿 = 弟
  - ⣑⠤⢾ - ゆ/彳 + 宿 + せ/食 = 鵜
  - ⡃⣐⠬ - な/亻 + ゆ/彳 + 宿 = 俤
  - ⡓⣐⠬ - ぬ/力 + ゆ/彳 + 宿 = 剃
  - ⠳⣐⠬ - る/忄 + ゆ/彳 + 宿 = 悌
  - ⢇⣐⠬ - き/木 + ゆ/彳 + 宿 = 梯
  - ⡇⣐⠬ - に/氵 + ゆ/彳 + 宿 = 涕
  - ⣷⣐⠬ - め/目 + ゆ/彳 + 宿 = 睇
- ⣱⠬ - 火 + 宿 = 蛍
  - ⣱⣰⠬ - 火 + 火 + 宿 = 螢
- ⡵⠬ - と/戸 + 宿 = 髯
- ⠥⡎ - 宿 + に/氵 = 垂
  - ⠷⠤⡎ - れ/口 + 宿 + に/氵 = 唾
  - ⠥⠤⡎ - 宿 + 宿 + に/氵 = 埀
  - ⡷⠤⡎ - て/扌 + 宿 + に/氵 = 捶
  - ⢣⠤⡎ - さ/阝 + 宿 + に/氵 = 陲
- ⡃⠤⠚ - な/亻 + 宿 + う/宀/# = 俘
- ⡵⠤⢘ - と/戸 + 宿 + 仁/亻 = 丱
- ⠥⠤⣈ - 宿 + 宿 + 龸 = 亅
- ⢑⠤⣚ - 仁/亻 + 宿 + ふ/女 = 佞
- ⡃⠤⡊ - な/亻 + 宿 + な/亻 = 侠
- ⡃⠤⢜ - な/亻 + 宿 + こ/子 = 偬
- ⢑⠤⢸ - 仁/亻 + 宿 + 氷/氵 = 傚
- ⡃⠤⣜ - な/亻 + 宿 + ほ/方 = 傲
- ⢑⠤⢪ - 仁/亻 + 宿 + さ/阝 = 僊
- ⡃⠤⡪ - な/亻 + 宿 + た/⽥ = 僵
- ⡃⠤⣪ - な/亻 + 宿 + ま/石 = 僻
- ⡃⠤⠎ - な/亻 + 宿 + い/糹/# = 儁
- ⢱⠤⢺ - 氷/氵 + 宿 + す/発 = 凌
- ⢗⠤⡞ - け/犬 + 宿 + ね/示 = 剄
- ⡓⠤⣪ - ぬ/力 + 宿 + ま/石 = 劈
- ⣅⠤⣎ - 日 + 宿 + ひ/辶 = 匙
- ⢣⠤⢪ - さ/阝 + 宿 + さ/阝 = 卿
- ⡱⠤⠚ - よ/广 + 宿 + う/宀/# = 厖
- ⡱⠤⢘ - よ/广 + 宿 + 仁/亻 = 厩
- ⡱⠤⢎ - よ/广 + 宿 + き/木 = 厮
- ⡱⠤⢸ - よ/广 + 宿 + 氷/氵 = 厰
- ⠷⠤⢺ - れ/口 + 宿 + す/発 = 咎
- ⠷⠤⣨ - れ/口 + 宿 + ん/止 = 唄
- ⠷⠤⡺ - れ/口 + 宿 + つ/土 = 啀
- ⠷⠤⡜ - れ/口 + 宿 + の/禾 = 喘
- ⠷⠤⣜ - れ/口 + 宿 + ほ/方 = 嗷
- ⣥⠤⣨ - 囗 + 宿 + ん/止 = 嗽
- ⣁⠤⡎ - 龸 + 宿 + に/氵 = 嘗
- ⠷⠤⡨ - れ/口 + 宿 + を/貝 = 嘶
- ⠷⠤⠚ - れ/口 + 宿 + う/宀/# = 噪
- ⠷⠤⢊ - れ/口 + 宿 + か/金 = 嚠
- ⠷⠤⠜ - れ/口 + 宿 + お/頁 = 囂
- ⡳⠤⠾ - つ/土 + 宿 + れ/口 = 垢
- ⡳⠤⣼ - つ/土 + 宿 + も/門 = 堰
- ⡳⠤⣞ - つ/土 + 宿 + へ/⺩ = 塀
- ⡳⠤⡸ - つ/土 + 宿 + よ/广 = 壥
- ⣓⠤⢪ - ふ/女 + 宿 + さ/阝 = 娜
- ⣓⠤⠪ - ふ/女 + 宿 + ら/月 = 娟
- ⣓⠤⣨ - ふ/女 + 宿 + ん/止 = 嫩
- ⣓⠤⡜ - ふ/女 + 宿 + の/禾 = 嬌
- ⡣⠤⣚ - た/⽥ + 宿 + ふ/女 = 嬲
- ⣓⠤⣮ - ふ/女 + 宿 + み/耳 = 孅
- ⢕⠤⡌ - こ/子 + 宿 + ゐ/幺 = 孳
- ⡵⠤⣊ - と/戸 + 宿 + は/辶 = 屐
- ⡑⠤⣜ - や/疒 + 宿 + ほ/方 = 峯
- ⢃⠤⠊ - か/金 + 宿 + selector 1 = 巛
- ⡱⠤⡚ - よ/广 + 宿 + ぬ/力 = 廁
- ⡱⠤⢺ - よ/广 + 宿 + す/発 = 廈
- ⡱⠤⡜ - よ/广 + 宿 + の/禾 = 廏
- ⡱⠤⡼ - よ/广 + 宿 + と/戸 = 廚
- ⡱⠤⡪ - よ/广 + 宿 + た/⽥ = 廬
- ⣑⠤⢸ - ゆ/彳 + 宿 + 氷/氵 = 徼
- ⣑⠤⡌ - ゆ/彳 + 宿 + ゐ/幺 = 徽
- ⠳⠤⠜ - る/忄 + 宿 + お/頁 = 忰
- ⣓⠤⢬ - ふ/女 + 宿 + 心 = 恕
- ⠳⠤⣼ - る/忄 + 宿 + も/門 = 恟
- ⠳⠤⠪ - る/忄 + 宿 + ら/月 = 悁
- ⠳⠤⡜ - る/忄 + 宿 + の/禾 = 惴
- ⠳⠤⣘ - る/忄 + 宿 + ゆ/彳 = 愆
- ⣑⠤⢬ - ゆ/彳 + 宿 + 心 = 愈
- ⠳⠤⢜ - る/忄 + 宿 + こ/子 = 愡
- ⠳⠤⡺ - る/忄 + 宿 + つ/土 = 慂
- ⣧⠤⢬ - み/耳 + 宿 + 心 = 慇
- ⠳⠤⢌ - る/忄 + 宿 + ⺼ = 慍
- ⢗⠤⢬ - け/犬 + 宿 + 心 = 慧
- ⠳⠤⢨ - る/忄 + 宿 + 数 = 慯
- ⢵⠤⢬ - そ/馬 + 宿 + 心 = 憑
- ⠳⠤⣌ - る/忄 + 宿 + 日 = 憺
- ⡓⠤⢬ - ぬ/力 + 宿 + 心 = 懃
- ⠳⠤⡪ - る/忄 + 宿 + た/⽥ = 懌
- ⠳⠤⠎ - る/忄 + 宿 + い/糹/# = 懼
- ⠳⠤⣨ - る/忄 + 宿 + ん/止 = 懿
- ⡷⠤⡚ - て/扌 + 宿 + ぬ/力 = 拐
- ⡷⠤⣬ - て/扌 + 宿 + 囗 = 拭
- ⡷⠤⠪ - て/扌 + 宿 + ら/月 = 捐
- ⡷⠤⡼ - て/扌 + 宿 + と/戸 = 掏
- ⡷⠤⣺ - て/扌 + 宿 + む/車 = 掻
- ⡷⠤⠾ - て/扌 + 宿 + れ/口 = 揖
- ⡷⠤⡜ - て/扌 + 宿 + の/禾 = 揣
- ⡷⠤⣌ - て/扌 + 宿 + 日 = 搨
- ⡷⠤⠎ - て/扌 + 宿 + い/糹/# = 摧
- ⡷⠤⢚ - て/扌 + 宿 + く/艹 = 摸
- ⡷⠤⡨ - て/扌 + 宿 + を/貝 = 撕
- ⡷⠤⣪ - て/扌 + 宿 + ま/石 = 擘
- ⡷⠤⢪ - て/扌 + 宿 + さ/阝 = 擲
- ⡷⠤⡮ - て/扌 + 宿 + ち/竹 = 擶
- ⠗⠤⡾ - え/訁 + 宿 + て/扌 = 攣
- ⣕⠤⢚ - ほ/方 + 宿 + く/艹 = 旒
- ⣕⠤⡜ - ほ/方 + 宿 + の/禾 = 旙
- ⣅⠤⢪ - 日 + 宿 + さ/阝 = 昂
- ⣅⠤⠜ - 日 + 宿 + お/頁 = 晰
- ⣅⠤⢨ - 日 + 宿 + 数 = 暘
- ⣅⠤⣮ - 日 + 宿 + み/耳 = 曩
- ⠣⠤⢎ - ら/月 + 宿 + き/木 = 朞
- ⢇⠤⠼ - き/木 + 宿 + ろ/十 = 枠
- ⢇⠤⢞ - き/木 + 宿 + け/犬 = 桀
- ⢇⠤⣼ - き/木 + 宿 + も/門 = 框
- ⢇⠤⡎ - き/木 + 宿 + に/氵 = 梁
- ⢥⠤⠾ - 心 + 宿 + れ/口 = 梔
- ⢥⠤⡊ - 心 + 宿 + な/亻 = 梛
- ⢥⠤⢨ - 心 + 宿 + 数 = 楊
- ⢇⠤⡸ - き/木 + 宿 + よ/广 = 楪
- ⢇⠤⢌ - き/木 + 宿 + ⺼ = 楹
- ⢥⠤⣼ - 心 + 宿 + も/門 = 榧
- ⢥⠤⢌ - 心 + 宿 + ⺼ = 榲
- ⢇⠤⣸ - き/木 + 宿 + 火 = 樮
- ⢇⠤⡊ - き/木 + 宿 + な/亻 = 樸
- ⢇⠤⡪ - き/木 + 宿 + た/⽥ = 樽
- ⢥⠤⡸ - 心 + 宿 + よ/广 = 橘
- ⢇⠤⢸ - き/木 + 宿 + 氷/氵 = 檄
- ⢥⠤⠮ - 心 + 宿 + り/分 = 檎
- ⢇⠤⣌ - き/木 + 宿 + 日 = 櫓
- ⢥⠤⣌ - 心 + 宿 + 日 = 櫟
- ⠗⠤⢎ - え/訁 + 宿 + き/木 = 欒
- ⣕⠤⢨ - ほ/方 + 宿 + 数 = 殤
- ⣧⠤⡜ - み/耳 + 宿 + の/禾 = 殷
- ⣣⠤⢼ - ま/石 + 宿 + そ/馬 = 毅
- ⡷⠤⣘ - て/扌 + 宿 + ゆ/彳 = 揄
- ⡷⠤⣊ - て/扌 + 宿 + は/辶 = 搏
- ⡷⠤⢺ - て/扌 + 宿 + す/発 = 撥
- ⡇⠤⡺ - に/氵 + 宿 + つ/土 = 涅
- ⡇⠤⡼ - に/氵 + 宿 + と/戸 = 淘
- ⡇⠤⡜ - に/氵 + 宿 + の/禾 = 湍
- ⡇⠤⣬ - に/氵 + 宿 + 囗 = 溷
- ⢱⠤⢘ - 氷/氵 + 宿 + 仁/亻 = 漑
- ⡇⠤⢼ - に/氵 + 宿 + そ/馬 = 漕
- ⡇⠤⢚ - に/氵 + 宿 + く/艹 = 漠
- ⡇⠤⣨ - に/氵 + 宿 + ん/止 = 漱
- ⢱⠤⢞ - 氷/氵 + 宿 + け/犬 = 潅
- ⡇⠤⢜ - に/氵 + 宿 + こ/子 = 潺
- ⡇⠤⡘ - に/氵 + 宿 + や/疒 = 澂
- ⡇⠤⠚ - に/氵 + 宿 + う/宀/# = 澎
- ⡇⠤⠪ - に/氵 + 宿 + ら/月 = 澗
- ⡇⠤⣌ - に/氵 + 宿 + 日 = 澹
- ⡇⠤⣚ - に/氵 + 宿 + ふ/女 = 濆
- ⣱⠤⢨ - 火 + 宿 + 数 = 煬
- ⣱⠤⢎ - 火 + 宿 + き/木 = 熈
- ⣱⠤⣌ - 火 + 宿 + 日 = 熾
- ⡳⠤⢾ - つ/土 + 宿 + せ/食 = 燕
- ⣱⠤⣺ - 火 + 宿 + む/車 = 燭
- ⡃⠤⣾ - な/亻 + 宿 + め/目 = 爽
- ⢵⠤⡼ - そ/馬 + 宿 + と/戸 = 犀
- ⢗⠤⠪ - け/犬 + 宿 + ら/月 = 狷
- ⢗⠤⡜ - け/犬 + 宿 + の/禾 = 猯
- ⢷⠤⢞ - せ/食 + 宿 + け/犬 = 猷
- ⢗⠤⢚ - け/犬 + 宿 + く/艹 = 獏
- ⣗⠤⠪ - へ/⺩ + 宿 + ら/月 = 瑚
- ⣗⠤⡪ - へ/⺩ + 宿 + た/⽥ = 璢
- ⡣⠤⢼ - た/⽥ + 宿 + そ/馬 = 疂
- ⡑⠤⢞ - や/疒 + 宿 + け/犬 = 痙
- ⡑⠤⣚ - や/疒 + 宿 + ふ/女 = 痿
- ⡑⠤⢌ - や/疒 + 宿 + ⺼ = 瘟
- ⡑⠤⡸ - や/疒 + 宿 + よ/广 = 癡
- ⢳⠤⠊ - す/発 + 宿 + selector 1 = 癶
- ⣅⠤⠼ - 日 + 宿 + ろ/十 = 皐
- ⣅⠤⢜ - 日 + 宿 + こ/子 = 皓
- ⡅⠤⢌ - ゐ/幺 + 宿 + ⺼ = 盈
- ⡇⠤⢌ - に/氵 + 宿 + ⺼ = 盥
- ⢳⠤⡪ - す/発 + 宿 + た/⽥ = 盧
- ⣷⠤⡺ - め/目 + 宿 + つ/土 = 睚
- ⣷⠤⣪ - め/目 + 宿 + ま/石 = 睫
- ⣷⠤⣾ - め/目 + 宿 + め/目 = 瞞
- ⣷⠤⣌ - め/目 + 宿 + 日 = 瞻
- ⡑⠤⡜ - や/疒 + 宿 + の/禾 = 矯
- ⣣⠤⣮ - ま/石 + 宿 + み/耳 = 碌
- ⣣⠤⢞ - ま/石 + 宿 + け/犬 = 碕
- ⣣⠤⡜ - ま/石 + 宿 + の/禾 = 磐
- ⣣⠤⢎ - ま/石 + 宿 + き/木 = 磔
- ⠧⠤⢎ - り/分 + 宿 + き/木 = 禽
- ⢥⠤⢺ - 心 + 宿 + す/発 = 稷
- ⡕⠤⡼ - の/禾 + 宿 + と/戸 = 穉
- ⡕⠤⠜ - の/禾 + 宿 + お/頁 = 穎
- ⡕⠤⣬ - の/禾 + 宿 + 囗 = 穡
- ⣣⠤⣺ - ま/石 + 宿 + む/車 = 竣
- ⡧⠤⢪ - ち/竹 + 宿 + さ/阝 = 笵
- ⡧⠤⣬ - ち/竹 + 宿 + 囗 = 筏
- ⡧⠤⠸ - ち/竹 + 宿 + 比 = 箆
- ⡧⠤⡾ - ち/竹 + 宿 + て/扌 = 箍
- ⡧⠤⠮ - ち/竹 + 宿 + り/分 = 箒
- ⡧⠤⢼ - ち/竹 + 宿 + そ/馬 = 篆
- ⡧⠤⣞ - ち/竹 + 宿 + へ/⺩ = 篇
- ⡧⠤⡊ - ち/竹 + 宿 + な/亻 = 篋
- ⡧⠤⣺ - ち/竹 + 宿 + む/車 = 篝
- ⡧⠤⡪ - ち/竹 + 宿 + た/⽥ = 篳
- ⡧⠤⠺ - ち/竹 + 宿 + る/忄 = 簍
- ⡧⠤⢎ - ち/竹 + 宿 + き/木 = 簗
- ⡧⠤⣌ - ち/竹 + 宿 + 日 = 簪
- ⡧⠤⣚ - ち/竹 + 宿 + ふ/女 = 籘
- ⡧⠤⣮ - ち/竹 + 宿 + み/耳 = 籤
- ⡕⠤⡎ - の/禾 + 宿 + に/氵 = 粱
- ⡕⠤⢪ - の/禾 + 宿 + さ/阝 = 粲
- ⡕⠤⠪ - の/禾 + 宿 + ら/月 = 糊
- ⡕⠤⣎ - の/禾 + 宿 + ひ/辶 = 糒
- ⡅⠤⣾ - ゐ/幺 + 宿 + め/目 = 緜
- ⠇⠤⣮ - い/糹/# + 宿 + み/耳 = 緝
- ⠇⠤⣪ - い/糹/# + 宿 + ま/石 = 縵
- ⣡⠤⢺ - ん/止 + 宿 + す/発 = 罅
- ⢳⠤⡺ - す/発 + 宿 + つ/土 = 罫
- ⢵⠤⢜ - そ/馬 + 宿 + こ/子 = 羔
- ⢵⠤⣸ - そ/馬 + 宿 + 火 = 羮
- ⢵⠤⢸ - そ/馬 + 宿 + 氷/氵 = 羯
- ⢅⠤⢼ - ⺼ + 宿 + そ/馬 = 羸
- ⣳⠤⠜ - む/車 + 宿 + お/頁 = 翆
- ⣁⠤⡘ - 龸 + 宿 + や/疒 = 耀
- ⡥⠤⢼ - ゑ/訁 + 宿 + そ/馬 = 聚
- ⣧⠤⡌ - み/耳 + 宿 + ゐ/幺 = 聯
- ⡵⠤⣚ - と/戸 + 宿 + ふ/女 = 肆
- ⢅⠤⢌ - ⺼ + 宿 + ⺼ = 膃
- ⢅⠤⡪ - ⺼ + 宿 + た/⽥ = 臚
- ⠗⠤⢌ - え/訁 + 宿 + ⺼ = 臠
- ⣓⠤⡪ - ふ/女 + 宿 + た/⽥ = 艫
- ⢓⠤⢪ - く/艹 + 宿 + さ/阝 = 范
- ⢥⠤⣸ - 心 + 宿 + 火 = 荻
- ⢥⠤⡚ - 心 + 宿 + ぬ/力 = 莉
- ⢥⠤⡬ - 心 + 宿 + ゑ/訁 = 菽
- ⢥⠤⢸ - 心 + 宿 + 氷/氵 = 葛
- ⢥⠤⠸ - 心 + 宿 + 比 = 蓖
- ⢓⠤⣪ - く/艹 + 宿 + ま/石 = 蔓
- ⢓⠤⢸ - く/艹 + 宿 + 氷/氵 = 蔽
- ⢥⠤⡜ - 心 + 宿 + の/禾 = 蕎
- ⢥⠤⣊ - 心 + 宿 + は/辶 = 薑
- ⢓⠤⢎ - く/艹 + 宿 + き/木 = 藁
- ⢥⠤⡎ - 心 + 宿 + に/氵 = 藻
- ⢓⠤⡎ - く/艹 + 宿 + に/氵 = 蘯
- ⣳⠤⡘ - む/車 + 宿 + や/疒 = 蚩
- ⣳⠤⠼ - む/車 + 宿 + ろ/十 = 蜃
- ⣳⠤⣞ - む/車 + 宿 + へ/⺩ = 蝙
- ⣳⠤⢚ - む/車 + 宿 + く/艹 = 蟇
- ⣳⠤⢬ - む/車 + 宿 + 心 = 蟋
- ⣳⠤⡼ - む/車 + 宿 + と/戸 = 蟒
- ⣳⠤⣌ - む/車 + 宿 + 日 = 蟾
- ⣳⠤⡸ - む/車 + 宿 + よ/广 = 蠣
- ⣳⠤⣺ - む/車 + 宿 + む/車 = 蠶
- ⣑⠤⠎ - ゆ/彳 + 宿 + い/糹/# = 衢
- ⡗⠤⣞ - ね/示 + 宿 + へ/⺩ = 褊
- ⡗⠤⢌ - ね/示 + 宿 + ⺼ = 褞
- ⡗⠤⣪ - ね/示 + 宿 + ま/石 = 襞
- ⡇⠤⢸ - に/氵 + 宿 + 氷/氵 = 覈
- ⠗⠤⣞ - え/訁 + 宿 + へ/⺩ = 諞
- ⠗⠤⡪ - え/訁 + 宿 + た/⽥ = 謖
- ⠗⠤⠜ - え/訁 + 宿 + お/頁 = 謫
- ⠗⠤⣌ - え/訁 + 宿 + 日 = 譫
- ⠗⠤⣪ - え/訁 + 宿 + ま/石 = 譬
- ⡥⠤⢨ - ゑ/訁 + 宿 + 数 = 讎
- ⠗⠤⣮ - え/訁 + 宿 + み/耳 = 讖
- ⠗⠤⡨ - え/訁 + 宿 + を/貝 = 讚
- ⡵⠤⢺ - と/戸 + 宿 + す/発 = 豎
- ⢗⠤⢼ - け/犬 + 宿 + そ/馬 = 豢
- ⡡⠤⣌ - を/貝 + 宿 + 日 = 贍
- ⢅⠤⡨ - ⺼ + 宿 + を/貝 = 贏
- ⡡⠤⢺ - を/貝 + 宿 + す/発 = 贓
- ⣧⠤⣈ - み/耳 + 宿 + 龸 = 跫
- ⣧⠤⣊ - み/耳 + 宿 + は/辶 = 跿
- ⣧⠤⡘ - み/耳 + 宿 + や/疒 = 踟
- ⣧⠤⢾ - み/耳 + 宿 + せ/食 = 躑
- ⣧⠤⡸ - み/耳 + 宿 + よ/广 = 躔
- ⣧⠤⣼ - み/耳 + 宿 + も/門 = 躙
- ⣧⠤⣮ - み/耳 + 宿 + み/耳 = 躡
- ⣳⠤⣮ - む/車 + 宿 + み/耳 = 輒
- ⣳⠤⡬ - む/車 + 宿 + ゑ/訁 = 輟
- ⣳⠤⡮ - む/車 + 宿 + ち/竹 = 轜
- ⣳⠤⠾ - む/車 + 宿 + れ/口 = 轡
- ⣳⠤⡪ - む/車 + 宿 + た/⽥ = 轤
- ⣳⠤⡌ - む/車 + 宿 + ゐ/幺 = 辮
- ⣇⠤⠬ - ひ/辶 + 宿 + 宿 = 辷
- ⣇⠤⣸ - ひ/辶 + 宿 + 火 = 逖
- ⣇⠤⡪ - ひ/辶 + 宿 + た/⽥ = 逹
- ⣇⠤⡚ - ひ/辶 + 宿 + ぬ/力 = 邉
- ⢣⠤⣬ - さ/阝 + 宿 + 囗 = 鄙
- ⢣⠤⡾ - さ/阝 + 宿 + て/扌 = 鄭
- ⢷⠤⢚ - せ/食 + 宿 + く/艹 = 醯
- ⢃⠤⡬ - か/金 + 宿 + ゑ/訁 = 錣
- ⢃⠤⣾ - か/金 + 宿 + め/目 = 錦
- ⢃⠤⠜ - か/金 + 宿 + お/頁 = 鏑
- ⢃⠤⣪ - か/金 + 宿 + ま/石 = 鏝
- ⢃⠤⠼ - か/金 + 宿 + ろ/十 = 鐐
- ⢃⠤⠎ - か/金 + 宿 + い/糹/# = 鐫
- ⢃⠤⡪ - か/金 + 宿 + た/⽥ = 鐸
- ⢃⠤⢺ - か/金 + 宿 + す/発 = 鑪
- ⢃⠤⠮ - か/金 + 宿 + り/分 = 鑰
- ⢃⠤⡨ - か/金 + 宿 + を/貝 = 鑽
- ⢃⠤⠞ - か/金 + 宿 + え/訁 = 鑾
- ⢃⠤⡜ - か/金 + 宿 + の/禾 = 鑿
- ⣵⠤⠬ - も/門 + 宿 + 宿 = 閂
- ⣵⠤⣪ - も/門 + 宿 + ま/石 = 闢
- ⢣⠤⠎ - さ/阝 + 宿 + い/糹/# = 隰
- ⢣⠤⢼ - さ/阝 + 宿 + そ/馬 = 隲
- ⡃⠤⢾ - な/亻 + 宿 + せ/食 = 雁
- ⡧⠤⢮ - ち/竹 + 宿 + し/巿 = 霈
- ⡧⠤⡎ - ち/竹 + 宿 + に/氵 = 霑
- ⡧⠤⡜ - ち/竹 + 宿 + の/禾 = 霞
- ⡧⠤⠪ - ち/竹 + 宿 + ら/月 = 霸
- ⡧⠤⣪ - ち/竹 + 宿 + ま/石 = 霹
- ⡧⠤⢸ - ち/竹 + 宿 + 氷/氵 = 靄
- ⣣⠤⣸ - ま/石 + 宿 + 火 = 靡
- ⣳⠤⡎ - む/車 + 宿 + に/氵 = 飃
- ⢷⠤⠚ - せ/食 + 宿 + う/宀/# = 餮
- ⢷⠤⢌ - せ/食 + 宿 + ⺼ = 饂
- ⢷⠤⢎ - せ/食 + 宿 + き/木 = 饉
- ⢵⠤⢊ - そ/馬 + 宿 + か/金 = 駻
- ⢵⠤⣺ - そ/馬 + 宿 + む/車 = 駿
- ⢵⠤⣞ - そ/馬 + 宿 + へ/⺩ = 騙
- ⢵⠤⢚ - そ/馬 + 宿 + く/艹 = 驀
- ⢵⠤⡜ - そ/馬 + 宿 + の/禾 = 驕
- ⢵⠤⡪ - そ/馬 + 宿 + た/⽥ = 驢
- ⢵⠤⢎ - そ/馬 + 宿 + き/木 = 驥
- ⢅⠤⠪ - ⺼ + 宿 + ら/月 = 髓
- ⡵⠤⣜ - と/戸 + 宿 + ほ/方 = 髣
- ⡵⠤⠾ - と/戸 + 宿 + れ/口 = 髭
- ⣑⠤⠾ - ゆ/彳 + 宿 + れ/口 = 鬻
- ⠕⠤⣘ - お/頁 + 宿 + ゆ/彳 = 魍
- ⢷⠤⡎ - せ/食 + 宿 + に/氵 = 鮨
- ⢷⠤⡼ - せ/食 + 宿 + と/戸 = 鰭
- ⢷⠤⣪ - せ/食 + 宿 + ま/石 = 鰻
- ⢷⠤⡪ - せ/食 + 宿 + た/⽥ = 鱸
- ⢣⠤⢾ - さ/阝 + 宿 + せ/食 = 鴛
- ⡇⠤⢾ - に/氵 + 宿 + せ/食 = 鴻
- ⣥⠤⢾ - 囗 + 宿 + せ/食 = 鵞
- ⢓⠤⢾ - く/艹 + 宿 + せ/食 = 鵠
- ⡗⠤⢾ - ね/示 + 宿 + せ/食 = 鵲
- ⢕⠤⢾ - こ/子 + 宿 + せ/食 = 鶲
- ⠧⠤⢾ - り/分 + 宿 + せ/食 = 鷁
- ⡕⠤⢾ - の/禾 + 宿 + せ/食 = 鷭
- ⡱⠤⢾ - よ/广 + 宿 + せ/食 = 鷹
- ⡡⠤⢾ - を/貝 + 宿 + せ/食 = 鸚
- ⠗⠤⢾ - え/訁 + 宿 + せ/食 = 鸞
- ⣇⠤⠬ - ひ/辶 + 宿 + 宿 = 辷
- ⣵⠤⠬ - も/門 + 宿 + 宿 = 閂
- ⠥⢶⠊ - 宿 + せ/食 + selector 1 = 鳬
