= Braille pattern dots-124 =

Braille pattern

6-dot braille cells
| ⠀ | ⠁ | ⠃ | ⠉ | ⠙ | ⠑ | ⠋ | ⠛ | ⠓ | ⠊ | ⠚ | ⠈ | ⠘ |
| ⠄ | ⠅ | ⠇ | ⠍ | ⠝ | ⠕ | ⠏ | ⠟ | ⠗ | ⠎ | ⠞ | ⠌ | ⠜ |
| ⠤ | ⠥ | ⠧ | ⠭ | ⠽ | ⠵ | ⠯ | ⠿ | ⠷ | ⠮ | ⠾ | ⠬ | ⠼ |
| ⠠ | ⠡ | ⠣ | ⠩ | ⠹ | ⠱ | ⠫ | ⠻ | ⠳ | ⠪ | ⠺ | ⠨ | ⠸ |
| shift down | ⠂ | ⠆ | ⠒ | ⠲ | ⠢ | ⠖ | ⠶ | ⠦ | ⠔ | ⠴ | ⠐ | ⠰ |

The Braille pattern dots-124 ( ⠋ ) is a 6-dot braille cell with the two top dots and middle left dot raised, or an 8-dot braille cell with both top dots and the upper-middle left dot raised. It is represented by the Unicode code point U+280b, and in Braille ASCII with F.

Character information
| Preview | ⠋ (braille pattern dots-124) | |
|---|---|---|
| Unicode name | BRAILLE PATTERN DOTS-124 | |
| Encodings | decimal | hex |
| Unicode | 10251 | U+280B |
| UTF-8 | 226 160 139 | E2 A0 8B |
| Numeric character reference | &#10251; | &#x280B; |
| Braille ASCII | 70 | 46 |

== Unified Braille ==
In unified international braille, the braille pattern dots-124 is used to represent unvoiced labial fricatives, such as /f/ and /ɸ/, and is otherwise assigned as needed. It is also used for the number 6.

=== Table of unified braille values ===
| French Braille | F, "faire" |
| English Braille | F |
| English Contraction | from, -self |
| German Braille | f |
| Bharati Braille | फ़ / ਫ਼ / ෆ / ف |
| Icelandic Braille | F |
| IPA Braille | /f/ |
| Russian Braille | Ф |
| Slovak Braille | F |
| Arabic Braille | ف |
| Persian Braille | ف |
| Irish Braille | F |
| Thai Braille | เ◌ e |
| Luxembourgish Braille | f (minuscule) |
| Greek Braille | Φ |

== Other braille ==
| Japanese Braille | e / え / エ |
| Korean Braille | k- / ㅋ, ka / 카 |
| Mainland Chinese Braille | F |
| Taiwanese Braille | t- / ㄊ |
| Two-Cell Chinese Braille | sh- -àn |
| Gardner Salinas Braille | f |
| Algerian Braille | ح |

== Plus dots 7 and 8 ==
Related to Braille pattern dots-124 are Braille patterns 1247, 1248, and 12478, which are used in 8-dot braille systems, such as Gardner-Salinas and Luxembourgish Braille.

Character information
| Preview | ⡋ (braille pattern dots-1247) | | ⢋ (braille pattern dots-1248) | | ⣋ (braille pattern dots-12478) | |
|---|---|---|---|---|---|---|
| Unicode name | BRAILLE PATTERN DOTS-1247 | | BRAILLE PATTERN DOTS-1248 | | BRAILLE PATTERN DOTS-12478 | |
| Encodings | decimal | hex | dec | hex | dec | hex |
| Unicode | 10315 | U+284B | 10379 | U+288B | 10443 | U+28CB |
| UTF-8 | 226 161 139 | E2 A1 8B | 226 162 139 | E2 A2 8B | 226 163 139 | E2 A3 8B |
| Numeric character reference | &#10315; | &#x284B; | &#10379; | &#x288B; | &#10443; | &#x28CB; |

| | dots 1247 | dots 1248 | dots 12478 |
|---|---|---|---|
| Gardner Salinas Braille | F (capital) | φ (phi) | Φ (Phi) |
| Luxembourgish Braille | F (capital) | | |

== Related 8-dot kantenji patterns ==
In the Japanese kantenji braille, the standard 8-dot Braille patterns 235, 1235, 2345, and 12345 are the patterns related to Braille pattern dots-124, since the two additional dots of kantenji patterns 0124, 1247, and 01247 are placed above the base 6-dot cell, instead of below, as in standard 8-dot braille.

Character information
| Preview | ⠖ (braille pattern dots-235) | | ⠗ (braille pattern dots-1235) | | ⠞ (braille pattern dots-2345) | | ⠟ (braille pattern dots-12345) | |
|---|---|---|---|---|---|---|---|---|
| Unicode name | BRAILLE PATTERN DOTS-235 | | BRAILLE PATTERN DOTS-1235 | | BRAILLE PATTERN DOTS-2345 | | BRAILLE PATTERN DOTS-12345 | |
| Encodings | decimal | hex | dec | hex | dec | hex | dec | hex |
| Unicode | 10262 | U+2816 | 10263 | U+2817 | 10270 | U+281E | 10271 | U+281F |
| UTF-8 | 226 160 150 | E2 A0 96 | 226 160 151 | E2 A0 97 | 226 160 158 | E2 A0 9E | 226 160 159 | E2 A0 9F |
| Numeric character reference | &#10262; | &#x2816; | &#10263; | &#x2817; | &#10270; | &#x281E; | &#10271; | &#x281F; |

=== Kantenji using braille patterns 235, 1235, 2345, or 12345 ===
This listing includes kantenji using Braille pattern dots-124 for all 6349 kanji found in JIS C 6226-1978.

- - 言

==== Variants and thematic compounds ====
- - selector 3 + え/訁 = 云
- - selector 4 + え/訁 = 亦
- - selector 5 + え/訁 = 叟
- - selector 6 + え/訁 = 袁
- - 数 + え/訁/#6 = 六
- - 比 + え/訁 = 高

==== Compounds of 言 ====
- - す/発 + え/訁 = 詈
- - 龸 + え/訁 = 誉
  - - 龸 + 龸 + え/訁 = 譽
- - ら/月 + え/訁 = 謄
- - な/亻 + え/訁 = 信
- - 仁/亻 + え/訁 = 儲
- - え/訁 + て/扌 = 訂
- - え/訁 + と/戸 = 訃
- - え/訁 + ろ/十 = 計
- - え/訁 + し/巿 = 討
  - - す/発 + え/訁 + し/巿 = 罸
- - え/訁 + な/亻 = 託
- - え/訁 + き/木 = 記
- - え/訁 + め/目 = 訝
- - え/訁 + ほ/方 = 訪
- - え/訁 + の/禾 = 設
- - え/訁 + そ/馬 = 許
  - - に/氵 + え/訁 + そ/馬 = 滸
- - え/訁 + へ/⺩ = 註
- - え/訁 + さ/阝 = 詐
- - え/訁 + ぬ/力 = 詔
- - え/訁 + り/分 = 評
- - え/訁 + 仁/亻 = 詞
- - え/訁 + せ/食 = 話
- - え/訁 + け/犬 = 誇
- - え/訁 + を/貝 = 誓
- - え/訁 + は/辶 = 誕
- - え/訁 + ゐ/幺 = 誘
- - え/訁 + ひ/辶 = 誠
- - え/訁 + こ/子 = 誤
- - え/訁 + 宿 = 説
- - え/訁 + つ/土 = 読
- - え/訁 + い/糹/#2 = 誰
- - え/訁 + た/⽥ = 課
- - え/訁 + 火 = 談
- - え/訁 + れ/口 = 諒
- - え/訁 + る/忄 = 論
- - え/訁 + よ/广 = 諜
- - え/訁 + ま/石 = 諦
- - え/訁 + ゆ/彳 = 諭
- - え/訁 + う/宀/#3 = 諺
- - え/訁 + 数 = 諾
- - え/訁 + 氷/氵 = 謁
  - - く/艹 + え/訁 + 氷/氵 = 藹
- - え/訁 + ⺼ = 謂
- - え/訁 + み/耳 = 謝
- - え/訁 + か/金 = 謡
  - - え/訁 + え/訁 + か/金 = 謠
- - え/訁 + も/門 = 謳
- - え/訁 + 日 = 識
- - え/訁 + ふ/女 = 譜
- - え/訁 + 囗 = 議
- - え/訁 + く/艹 = 護
- - え/訁 + こ/子 + selector 1 = 訌
  - - え/訁 + 仁/亻 + ふ/女 = 誣
- - え/訁 + 宿 + か/金 = 訐
- - え/訁 + 龸 + お/頁 = 訖
- - え/訁 + 仁/亻 + 比 = 訛
- - え/訁 + 囗 + 仁/亻 = 訥
- - え/訁 + 比 + か/金 = 訶
- - え/訁 + れ/口 + ろ/十 = 詁
- - え/訁 + selector 1 + ん/止 = 詆
- - え/訁 + 宿 + ひ/辶 = 詑
- - え/訁 + selector 4 + な/亻 = 詒
- - え/訁 + selector 5 + そ/馬 = 詛
- - え/訁 + 日 + す/発 = 詢
- - え/訁 + よ/广 + れ/口 = 詬
- - え/訁 + く/艹 + さ/阝 = 詭
- - え/訁 + よ/广 + 火 = 詼
- - え/訁 + き/木 + な/亻 = 誄
- - え/訁 + selector 5 + か/金 = 誅
- - え/訁 + け/犬 + へ/⺩ = 誑
- - え/訁 + そ/馬 + ⺼ = 誚
- - え/訁 + と/戸 + 囗 = 誡
- - え/訁 + こ/子 + く/艹 = 誥
- - え/訁 + 宿 + つ/土 = 誦
- - え/訁 + み/耳 + ゑ/訁 = 諏
- - え/訁 + う/宀/#3 + そ/馬 = 誼
- - え/訁 + 宿 + ぬ/力 = 諂
- - え/訁 + 龸 + こ/子 = 諄
- - え/訁 + そ/馬 + 宿 = 諍
- - え/訁 + う/宀/#3 + よ/广 = 諚
- - え/訁 + 宿 + へ/⺩ = 諞
- - え/訁 + う/宀/#3 + 日 = 諠
- - え/訁 + 宿 + も/門 = 諡
- - え/訁 + 宿 + む/車 = 諢
- - え/訁 + 宿 + け/犬 = 諤
- - え/訁 + 比 + 日 = 諧
- - え/訁 + 宿 + い/糹/#2 = 諱
- - え/訁 + む/車 + 宿 = 諷
- - え/訁 + か/金 + ん/止 = 謌
- - え/訁 + ひ/辶 + の/禾 = 謎
- - え/訁 + 心 + selector 5 = 謐
- - え/訁 + す/発 + か/金 = 謔
- - え/訁 + 宿 + た/⽥ = 謖
- - え/訁 + り/分 + ⺼ = 謚
- - え/訁 + み/耳 + の/禾 = 謦
- - え/訁 + 宿 + く/艹 = 謨
- - え/訁 + 宿 + お/頁 = 謫
- - え/訁 + む/車 + selector 2 = 謬
- - え/訁 + 龸 + ま/石 = 謾
- - え/訁 + く/艹 + か/金 = 譁
- - え/訁 + 龸 + 火 = 譌
- - え/訁 + selector 1 + よ/广 = 譎
- - え/訁 + ゐ/幺 + 囗 = 譏
- - え/訁 + 龸 + 日 = 譖
- - え/訁 + 日 + ろ/十 = 譚
- - え/訁 + 日 + け/犬 = 譛
- - え/訁 + れ/口 + う/宀/#3 = 譟
- - え/訁 + 宿 + 日 = 譫
- - え/訁 + 宿 + ま/石 = 譬
- - え/訁 + は/辶 + ら/月 = 譴
- - え/訁 + を/貝 + け/犬 = 讃
- - え/訁 + 龸 + つ/土 = 讌
- - え/訁 + ぬ/力 + 宿 = 讒
- - え/訁 + 宿 + み/耳 = 讖
- - え/訁 + 龸 + け/犬 = 讙
- - え/訁 + 宿 + を/貝 = 讚
- - え/訁 + と/戸 + ろ/十 = 鞫
- - え/訁 + え/訁 + 心 = 戀
- - え/訁 + え/訁 + む/車 = 蠻
- - え/訁 + え/訁 + つ/土 = 讀
- - え/訁 + え/訁 + す/発 = 變
- - や/疒 + う/宀/#3 + え/訁 = 巒
- - え/訁 + 宿 + て/扌 = 攣
- - え/訁 + 宿 + き/木 = 欒
- - え/訁 + 宿 + ⺼ = 臠
- - か/金 + 宿 + え/訁 = 鑾
- - え/訁 + 宿 + せ/食 = 鸞

==== Compounds of 云 ====
- - り/分 + え/訁 = 会
  - - い/糹/#2 + え/訁 = 絵
- - こ/子 + え/訁 = 耘
- - く/艹 + え/訁 = 芸
  - - く/艹 + く/艹 + え/訁 = 藝
    - - れ/口 + く/艹 + え/訁 = 囈
- - え/訁 + に/氵 = 魂
- - ち/竹 + え/訁 = 雲
  - - い/糹/#2 + ち/竹 + え/訁 = 繧
- - い/糹/#2 + 宿 + え/訁 = 紜

==== Compounds of 六 and 亦 ====
- - う/宀/#3 + 数 + え/訁 = 宍
- - え/訁 + す/発 = 変
- - え/訁 + 心 = 恋
- - え/訁 + む/車 = 蛮
- - み/耳 + え/訁 = 跡
- - え/訁 + 比 + け/犬 = 奕
- - ひ/辶 + 宿 + え/訁 = 迹

==== Compounds of 叟 ====
- - て/扌 + え/訁 = 捜
- - て/扌 + て/扌 + え/訁 = 搜
- - や/疒 + え/訁 = 痩
- - ふ/女 + selector 5 + え/訁 = 嫂
- - に/氵 + 宿 + え/訁 = 溲
- - ふ/女 + 宿 + え/訁 = 艘

==== Compounds of 袁 ====
- - 囗 + え/訁 = 園
  - - く/艹 + 囗 + え/訁 = 薗
- - け/犬 + え/訁 = 猿
- - ひ/辶 + え/訁 = 遠
- - む/車 + 宿 + え/訁 = 轅

==== Compounds of 高 ====
- - の/禾 + え/訁 = 稿
- - ゐ/幺 + え/訁 = 縞
- - ⺼ + え/訁 = 膏
- - れ/口 + 比 + え/訁 = 嚆
- - つ/土 + 比 + え/訁 = 塙
- - や/疒 + 比 + え/訁 = 嵩
- - は/辶 + 比 + え/訁 = 敲
- - き/木 + 比 + え/訁 = 槁
- - そ/馬 + 比 + え/訁 = 犒
- - の/禾 + 比 + え/訁 = 稾
- - 心 + 比 + え/訁 = 蒿
- - か/金 + 比 + え/訁 = 鎬
- - う/宀/#3 + 比 + え/訁 = 髞

==== Other compounds ====
- - え/訁 + ん/止 = 円
  - - え/訁 + え/訁 + ん/止 = 圓
- - う/宀/#3 + え/訁 = 寅
  - - 氷/氵 + え/訁 = 演
- - ま/石 + え/訁 = 商
- - ね/示 + え/訁 = 裔
- - に/氵 + え/訁 = 沿
- - ふ/女 + え/訁 = 船
- - か/金 + え/訁 = 鉛
- - 囗 + 宿 + え/訁 = 冏
- - き/木 + え/訁 = 柄
- - ゆ/彳 + え/訁 = 衛
  - - ゆ/彳 + ゆ/彳 + え/訁 = 衞
- - せ/食 + え/訁 = 餌
- - そ/馬 + え/訁 = 駸
- - り/分 + り/分 + え/訁 = 會
  - - け/犬 + り/分 + え/訁 = 獪
  - - ⺼ + り/分 + え/訁 = 膾
  - - く/艹 + り/分 + え/訁 = 薈
  - - せ/食 + り/分 + え/訁 = 鱠
  - - い/糹/#2 + い/糹/#2 + え/訁 = 繪
