= Braille pattern dots-15 =

Braille pattern

6-dot braille cells
⠀	⠁	⠃	⠉	⠙	⠑	⠋	⠛	⠓	⠊	⠚	⠈	⠘
⠄	⠅	⠇	⠍	⠝	⠕	⠏	⠟	⠗	⠎	⠞	⠌	⠜
⠤	⠥	⠧	⠭	⠽	⠵	⠯	⠿	⠷	⠮	⠾	⠬	⠼
⠠	⠡	⠣	⠩	⠹	⠱	⠫	⠻	⠳	⠪	⠺	⠨	⠸
shift down	⠂	⠆	⠒	⠲	⠢	⠖	⠶	⠦	⠔	⠴	⠐	⠰

The Braille pattern dots-15 ( ⠑ ) is a 6-dot braille cell with the top left and middle right dots raised, or an 8-dot braille cell with the top left and right upper-middle dots raised. It is represented by the Unicode code point U+2811, and in Braille ASCII with E.

Character information
Preview	⠑ (braille pattern dots-15)	
Unicode name	BRAILLE PATTERN DOTS-15	
Encodings	decimal	hex
Unicode	10257	U+2811
UTF-8	226 160 145	E2 A0 91
Numeric character reference	&#10257;	&#x2811;
Braille ASCII	69	45

== Unified Braille ==
In unified international braille, the braille pattern dots-15 is used to represent unrounded, near-mid, front vowels, such as /e/ or /ɛ/. It is also used for the number 5.

=== Table of unified braille values ===
French Braille	E
English Braille	E
English Contraction	every
German Braille	E
Bharati Braille	ए / ਏ / એ / এ / ଏ / ఏ / ಏ / ഏ / ஏ / එ / ے
Icelandic Braille	E
IPA Braille	/e/
Russian Braille	Е
Slovak Braille	E
Arabic Braille	ـِ (kasrah)
Irish Braille	E
Thai Braille	ัว ua
Luxembourgish Braille	e (minuscule)

== Other braille ==
Japanese Braille	ra / ら / ラ
Korean Braille	m- / ㅁ
Mainland Chinese Braille	ye, -ie
Taiwanese Braille	s,x / ㄙ,ㄒ
Two-Cell Chinese Braille	ji- -èng
Algerian Braille	ج

== Plus dots 7 and 8 ==
Related to Braille pattern dots-15 are Braille patterns 157, 158, and 1578, which are used in 8-dot braille systems, such as Gardner-Salinas and Luxembourgish Braille.

Character information
Preview	⡑ (braille pattern dots-157)		⢑ (braille pattern dots-158)		⣑ (braille pattern dots-1578)	
Unicode name	BRAILLE PATTERN DOTS-157		BRAILLE PATTERN DOTS-158		BRAILLE PATTERN DOTS-1578	
Encodings	decimal	hex	dec	hex	dec	hex
Unicode	10321	U+2851	10385	U+2891	10449	U+28D1
UTF-8	226 161 145	E2 A1 91	226 162 145	E2 A2 91	226 163 145	E2 A3 91
Numeric character reference	&#10321;	&#x2851;	&#10385;	&#x2891;	&#10449;	&#x28D1;

	dots 157	dots 158	dots 1578
Gardner Salinas Braille	E (capital)	ε (epsilon)	∈ (element symbol)
Luxembourgish Braille	E (capital)		

== Related 8-dot kantenji patterns ==
In the Japanese kantenji braille, the standard 8-dot Braille patterns 26, 126, 246, and 1246 are the patterns related to Braille pattern dots-15, since the two additional dots of kantenji patterns 015, 157, and 0157 are placed above the base 6-dot cell, instead of below, as in standard 8-dot braille.

Character information
Preview	⠢ (braille pattern dots-26)		⠣ (braille pattern dots-126)		⠪ (braille pattern dots-246)		⠫ (braille pattern dots-1246)	
Unicode name	BRAILLE PATTERN DOTS-26		BRAILLE PATTERN DOTS-126		BRAILLE PATTERN DOTS-246		BRAILLE PATTERN DOTS-1246	
Encodings	decimal	hex	dec	hex	dec	hex	dec	hex
Unicode	10274	U+2822	10275	U+2823	10282	U+282A	10283	U+282B
UTF-8	226 160 162	E2 A0 A2	226 160 163	E2 A0 A3	226 160 170	E2 A0 AA	226 160 171	E2 A0 AB
Numeric character reference	&#10274;	&#x2822;	&#10275;	&#x2823;	&#10282;	&#x282A;	&#10283;	&#x282B;

=== Kantenji using braille patterns 26, 126, 246, or 1246 ===
This listing includes kantenji using Braille pattern dots-15 for all 6349 kanji found in JIS C 6226-1978.

- - 月

==== Variants and thematic compounds ====
- - selector 6 + ら/月 = 胡
- - 数 + ら/月/#5 = 五
- - 比 + ら/月 = 亙

==== Compounds of 月 ====
- - ろ/十 + ら/月 = 有
  - - つ/土 + ら/月 = 堕
  - - を/貝 + ら/月 = 賄
    - - さ/阝 + ら/月 = 随
    - - ⺼ + ら/月 = 髄
  - - な/亻 + ろ/十 + ら/月 = 侑
  - - 囗 + ろ/十 + ら/月 = 囿
  - - う/宀/#3 + ろ/十 + ら/月 = 宥
  - - さ/阝 + ろ/十 + ら/月 = 陏
  - - せ/食 + ろ/十 + ら/月 = 鮪
- - 龸 + ら/月 = 育
  - - む/車 + ら/月 = 轍
  - - ゆ/彳 + ら/月 = 徹
  - - て/扌 + ら/月 = 撤
- - ら/月 + ら/月 = 朋
  - - や/疒 + ら/月 = 崩
  - - ら/月 + せ/食 = 鵬
  - - ま/石 + ら/月 + ら/月 = 硼
  - - く/艹 + ら/月 + ら/月 = 萠
  - - つ/土 + ら/月 + ら/月 = 堋
  - - ゆ/彳 + ら/月 + ら/月 = 弸
- - ら/月 + ぬ/力 = 前
  - - 火 + ら/月 = 煎
  - - ぬ/力 + ら/月 + ぬ/力 = 剪
  - - ち/竹 + ら/月 + ぬ/力 = 箭
  - - む/車 + ら/月 + ぬ/力 = 翦
- - か/金 + ら/月 = 骨
  - - 氷/氵 + ら/月 = 滑
  - - 心 + か/金 + ら/月 = 榾
  - - け/犬 + か/金 + ら/月 = 猾
  - - ま/石 + か/金 + ら/月 = 磆
  - - か/金 + か/金 + ら/月 = 骭
  - - の/禾 + か/金 + ら/月 = 骰
  - - 数 + か/金 + ら/月 = 髏
  - - む/車 + か/金 + ら/月 = 髑
- - 日 + ら/月 = 明
  - - く/艹 + 日 + ら/月 = 萌
- - ら/月 + の/禾 = 能
  - - ら/月 + 心 = 態
  - - ら/月 + 火 = 熊
    - - す/発 + ら/月 + 火 = 羆
  - - す/発 + ら/月 = 罷
    - - て/扌 + す/発 + ら/月 = 擺
- - よ/广 + ら/月 = 厭
- - る/忄 + ら/月 = 惰
- - つ/土 + つ/土 + ら/月 = 墮
- - き/木 + さ/阝 + ら/月 = 橢
- - き/木 + 宿 + ら/月 = 楕
- - ⺼ + ⺼ + ら/月 = 膸
- - さ/阝 + 宿 + ら/月 = 隋
- - さ/阝 + さ/阝 + ら/月 = 隨
- - ⺼ + 宿 + ら/月 = 髓
- - ほ/方 + ら/月 = 望
- - い/糹/#2 + ら/月 = 絹
  - - す/発 + い/糹/#2 + ら/月 = 羂
- - ふ/女 + 宿 + ら/月 = 娟
- - る/忄 + 宿 + ら/月 = 悁
- - て/扌 + 宿 + ら/月 = 捐
- - け/犬 + 宿 + ら/月 = 狷
- - に/氵 + 龸 + ら/月 = 涓
- - ら/月 + 宿 + せ/食 = 鵑
- - ん/止 + ら/月 = 肯
- - た/⽥ + ら/月 = 胄
- - ぬ/力 + ら/月 = 脅
- - と/戸 + ら/月 = 覇
- - ち/竹 + 宿 + ら/月 = 霸
- - ら/月 + か/金 = 勝
- - ら/月 + 氷/氵 = 散
  - - て/扌 + ら/月 + 氷/氵 = 撒
  - - い/糹/#2 + ら/月 + 氷/氵 = 繖
- - ら/月 + ゐ/幺 = 服
  - - ち/竹 + ら/月 + ゐ/幺 = 箙
- - ら/月 + は/辶 = 朔
  - - ひ/辶 + ら/月 + は/辶 = 遡
  - - る/忄 + ら/月 + は/辶 = 愬
  - - き/木 + ら/月 + は/辶 = 槊
  - - に/氵 + ら/月 + は/辶 = 溯
- - ら/月 + け/犬 = 朕
  - - ら/月 + け/犬 + に/氵 = 滕
  - - ら/月 + け/犬 + ゐ/幺 = 縢
- - ふ/女 + も/門 + ら/月 = 嫺
- - や/疒 + も/門 + ら/月 = 癇
- - い/糹/#2 + も/門 + ら/月 = 繝
- - ら/月 + や/疒 = 朗
- - ら/月 + き/木 = 期
- - ら/月 + ま/石 = 朧
- - ら/月 + も/門 = 胞
- - ら/月 + と/戸 = 脹
- - ら/月 + し/巿 = 腑
- - ら/月 + う/宀/#3 = 膨
- - ら/月 + な/亻 = 臆
- - ら/月 + す/発 = 臓
  - - ら/月 + ら/月 + す/発 = 臟
- - ら/月 + ろ/十 = 臘
- - ら/月 + え/訁 = 謄
- - ら/月 + そ/馬 = 騰
- - に/氵 + ら/月 + 氷/氵 = 潸
- - ら/月 + 比 + へ/⺩ = 朏
- - ら/月 + 比 + や/疒 = 朖
- - ら/月 + 宿 + き/木 = 朞
- - ら/月 + 宿 + そ/馬 = 朦
- - く/艹 + 宿 + ら/月 = 臈

==== Compounds of 胡 ====
- - に/氵 + ら/月 = 湖
- - 心 + selector 6 + ら/月 = 楜
- - へ/⺩ + 宿 + ら/月 = 瑚
- - の/禾 + 宿 + ら/月 = 糊
- - む/車 + selector 6 + ら/月 = 蝴
- - せ/食 + selector 6 + ら/月 = 餬

==== Compounds of 五 and 亙 ====
- - ら/月/#5 + れ/口 = 吾
  - - れ/口 + ら/月 + れ/口 = 唔
  - - 囗 + ら/月 + れ/口 = 圄
  - - う/宀/#3 + ら/月 + れ/口 = 寤
  - - 日 + ら/月 + れ/口 = 晤
  - - 心 + ら/月 + れ/口 = 梧
  - - そ/馬 + ら/月 + れ/口 = 牾
  - - へ/⺩ + ら/月 + れ/口 = 珸
  - - ゆ/彳 + ら/月 + れ/口 = 衙
  - - ん/止 + ら/月 + れ/口 = 齬
- - な/亻 + 数 + ら/月 = 伍

==== Other compounds ====
- - う/宀/#3 + ら/月 = 官
  - - き/木 + ら/月 = 棺
  - - せ/食 + ら/月 = 館
  - - ち/竹 + ら/月 = 管
  - - 心 + ら/月 = 菅
  - - い/糹/#2 + う/宀/#3 + ら/月 = 綰
  - - せ/食 + 宿 + ら/月 = 舘
- - し/巿 + ら/月 = 師
  - - け/犬 + ら/月 = 獅
  - - ち/竹 + し/巿 + ら/月 = 篩
  - - せ/食 + し/巿 + ら/月 = 鰤
- - は/辶 + ら/月 = 遣
  - - え/訁 + は/辶 + ら/月 = 譴
  - - か/金 + は/辶 + ら/月 = 鑓
  - - ゐ/幺 + ら/月 = 縋
- - ひ/辶 + ら/月 = 追
  - - か/金 + ひ/辶 + ら/月 = 鎚
- - こ/子 + 宿 + ら/月 = 耜
- - ふ/女 + ら/月 = 媼
- - そ/馬 + ら/月 = 蓋
- - そ/馬 + 宿 + ら/月 = 盖
- - そ/馬 + 龸 + ら/月 = 葢
- - ら/月 + た/⽥ = 留
  - - 心 + ら/月 + た/⽥ = 榴
  - - に/氵 + ら/月 + た/⽥ = 溜
  - - へ/⺩ + ら/月 + た/⽥ = 瑠
  - - や/疒 + ら/月 + た/⽥ = 瘤
  - - ち/竹 + ら/月 + た/⽥ = 霤
  - - せ/食 + う/宀/#3 + ら/月 = 鰡
  - - せ/食 + 龸 + ら/月 = 餾
  - - ち/竹 + 龸 + ら/月 = 籀
- - ら/月 + を/貝 = 貿
- - ら/月 + ら/月 + た/⽥ = 畄
  - - い/糹/#2 + ら/月 + た/⽥ = 緇
  - - む/車 + ら/月 + た/⽥ = 輜
  - - か/金 + ら/月 + た/⽥ = 錙
  - - せ/食 + ら/月 + た/⽥ = 鯔
- - て/扌 + ら/月 + か/金 = 捷
- - 氷/氵 + ら/月 + た/⽥ = 澑
- - に/氵 + 宿 + ら/月 = 澗
