= Braille pattern dots-134 =

Braille pattern

6-dot braille cells
⠀	⠁	⠃	⠉	⠙	⠑	⠋	⠛	⠓	⠊	⠚	⠈	⠘
⠄	⠅	⠇	⠍	⠝	⠕	⠏	⠟	⠗	⠎	⠞	⠌	⠜
⠤	⠥	⠧	⠭	⠽	⠵	⠯	⠿	⠷	⠮	⠾	⠬	⠼
⠠	⠡	⠣	⠩	⠹	⠱	⠫	⠻	⠳	⠪	⠺	⠨	⠸
shift down	⠂	⠆	⠒	⠲	⠢	⠖	⠶	⠦	⠔	⠴	⠐	⠰

The Braille pattern dots-134 (⠍) is a 6-dot braille cell with both top and the bottom left dots raised, or an 8-dot braille cell with both top and the lower-middle left dots raised. It is represented by the Unicode code point U+280d, and in Braille ASCII with M.

Character information
Preview	⠍ (braille pattern dots-134)	
Unicode name	BRAILLE PATTERN DOTS-134	
Encodings	decimal	hex
Unicode	10253	U+280D
UTF-8	226 160 141	E2 A0 8D
Numeric character reference	&#10253;	&#x280D;
Braille ASCII	77	4D

== Unified Braille ==
In unified international braille, the braille pattern dots-134 is used to represent a bilabial nasal, i.e. /m/.

=== Table of unified braille values ===
French Braille	M, "me"
English Braille	M
English Contraction	more
German Braille	M
Bharati Braille	म / ਮ / મ / ম / ମ / మ / ಮ / മ / ம / ම / م
Icelandic Braille	M
IPA Braille	/m/
Russian Braille	М
Slovak Braille	M
Arabic Braille	م
Persian Braille	م
Irish Braille	M
Thai Braille	ม m
Luxembourgish Braille	m (minuscule)

== Other braille ==
Japanese Braille	nu / ぬ / ヌ
Korean Braille	u / ㅜ
Mainland Chinese Braille	M
Taiwanese Braille	M / ㄇ
Two-Cell Chinese Braille	ch- -ōu
Gardner Salinas Braille	m
Algerian Braille	ش

== Plus dots 7 and 8 ==
Related to Braille pattern dots-134 are Braille patterns 1347, 1348, and 13478, which are used in 8-dot braille systems, such as Gardner-Salinas and Luxembourgish Braille.

Character information
Preview	⡍ (braille pattern dots-1347)		⢍ (braille pattern dots-1348)		⣍ (braille pattern dots-13478)	
Unicode name	BRAILLE PATTERN DOTS-1347		BRAILLE PATTERN DOTS-1348		BRAILLE PATTERN DOTS-13478	
Encodings	decimal	hex	dec	hex	dec	hex
Unicode	10317	U+284D	10381	U+288D	10445	U+28CD
UTF-8	226 161 141	E2 A1 8D	226 162 141	E2 A2 8D	226 163 141	E2 A3 8D
Numeric character reference	&#10317;	&#x284D;	&#10381;	&#x288D;	&#10445;	&#x28CD;

	dots 1347	dots 1348	dots 13478
Gardner Salinas Braille	M (capital)	μ (mu)	
Luxembourgish Braille	M (capital)		

== Related 8-dot kantenji patterns ==
In the Japanese kantenji braille, the standard 8-dot Braille patterns 257, 1257, 2457, and 12457 are the patterns related to Braille pattern dots-134, since the two additional dots of kantenji patterns 0134, 1347, and 01347 are placed above the base 6-dot cell, instead of below, as in standard 8-dot braille.

Character information
Preview	⡒ (braille pattern dots-257)		⡓ (braille pattern dots-1257)		⡚ (braille pattern dots-2457)		⡛ (braille pattern dots-12457)	
Unicode name	BRAILLE PATTERN DOTS-257		BRAILLE PATTERN DOTS-1257		BRAILLE PATTERN DOTS-2457		BRAILLE PATTERN DOTS-12457	
Encodings	decimal	hex	dec	hex	dec	hex	dec	hex
Unicode	10322	U+2852	10323	U+2853	10330	U+285A	10331	U+285B
UTF-8	226 161 146	E2 A1 92	226 161 147	E2 A1 93	226 161 154	E2 A1 9A	226 161 155	E2 A1 9B
Numeric character reference	&#10322;	&#x2852;	&#10323;	&#x2853;	&#10330;	&#x285A;	&#10331;	&#x285B;

=== Kantenji using braille patterns 257, 1257, 2457, or 12457 ===
This listing includes kantenji using Braille pattern dots-134 for all 6349 kanji found in JIS C 6226-1978.

- - 力

==== Variants and thematic compounds ====
- - selector 1 + ぬ/力 = 刃
  - - selector 1 + selector 1 + ぬ/力 = 刄
- - selector 4 + ぬ/力 = 刀
- - selector 6 + ぬ/力 = 臼
- - 比 + ぬ/力 = 匁
- - ぬ/力 + 宿 = 免
- - ぬ/力 + お/頁 = 負

==== Compounds of 力 ====
- - た/⽥ + ぬ/力 = 男
  - - ぬ/力 + た/⽥ = 勇
    - - に/氵 + ぬ/力 + た/⽥ = 湧
    - - み/耳 + ぬ/力 + た/⽥ = 踴
  - - す/発 + ぬ/力 = 虜
  - - ふ/女 + た/⽥ + ぬ/力 = 嫐
  - - せ/食 + た/⽥ + ぬ/力 = 甥
  - - ぬ/力 + た/⽥ + ぬ/力 = 舅
- - ぬ/力 + れ/口 = 加
  - - ぬ/力 + を/貝 = 賀
  - - つ/土 + ぬ/力 = 嘉
  - - き/木 + ぬ/力 + れ/口 = 枷
  - - へ/⺩ + ぬ/力 + れ/口 = 珈
  - - や/疒 + ぬ/力 + れ/口 = 痂
  - - ち/竹 + ぬ/力 + れ/口 = 笳
  - - 心 + ぬ/力 + れ/口 = 茄
  - - ね/示 + ぬ/力 + れ/口 = 袈
  - - み/耳 + ぬ/力 + れ/口 = 跏
  - - ひ/辶 + ぬ/力 + れ/口 = 迦
  - - そ/馬 + ぬ/力 + れ/口 = 駕
- - こ/子 + ぬ/力 = 功
- - そ/馬 + ぬ/力 = 劣
- - 龸 + ぬ/力 = 労
  - - 龸 + 龸 + ぬ/力 = 勞
    - - て/扌 + 龸 + ぬ/力 = 撈
    - - や/疒 + 龸 + ぬ/力 = 癆
- - ち/竹 + ぬ/力 = 効
- - ゐ/幺 + ぬ/力 = 劾
- - り/分 + ぬ/力 = 動
  - - る/忄 + り/分 + ぬ/力 = 慟
- - も/門 + ぬ/力 = 勘
- - よ/广 + ぬ/力 = 務
- - く/艹 + ぬ/力 = 募
- - 火 + ぬ/力 = 勢
- - ろ/十 + ぬ/力 = 協
- - ぬ/力 + そ/馬 = 助
  - - 日 + ぬ/力 + そ/馬 = 勗
  - - こ/子 + ぬ/力 + そ/馬 = 耡
  - - く/艹 + ぬ/力 + そ/馬 = 莇
  - - か/金 + ぬ/力 + そ/馬 = 鋤
- - ぬ/力 + ゑ/訁 = 努
- - ぬ/力 + ま/石 = 励
- - ぬ/力 + ろ/十 = 勃
  - - に/氵 + ぬ/力 + ろ/十 = 渤
- - ぬ/力 + 数 = 勅
- - ぬ/力 + き/木 = 勤
- - ぬ/力 + 火 = 勲
  - - ぬ/力 + ぬ/力 + 火 = 勳
- - ぬ/力 + ら/月 = 脅
- - ぬ/力 + ぬ/力 + ま/石 = 勵
- - ぬ/力 + つ/土 + こ/子 = 劫
- - ぬ/力 + も/門 + selector 5 = 劬
- - ぬ/力 + つ/土 + れ/口 = 劼
- - け/犬 + 宿 + ぬ/力 = 勁
- - ぬ/力 + 龸 + れ/口 = 勍
- - と/戸 + 宿 + ぬ/力 = 勒
- - ぬ/力 + む/車 + selector 2 = 勠
- - ぬ/力 + へ/⺩ + を/貝 = 勣
- - ぬ/力 + か/金 + き/木 = 勦
- - ふ/女 + う/宀/#3 + ぬ/力 = 娚
- - る/忄 + 宿 + ぬ/力 = 恊
- - ぬ/力 + 宿 + 心 = 懃
- - て/扌 + う/宀/#3 + ぬ/力 = 抛
- - き/木 + う/宀/#3 + ぬ/力 = 朸
- - か/金 + 龸 + ぬ/力 = 釛
- - ぬ/力 + 宿 + せ/食 = 飭

===== Compounds of 刂 =====
- - ほ/方 + ぬ/力 = 列
  - - な/亻 + ぬ/力 = 例
  - - 氷/氵 + ほ/方 + ぬ/力 = 冽
  - - に/氵 + ほ/方 + ぬ/力 = 洌
- - ら/月 + ぬ/力 = 前
  - - ぬ/力 + て/扌 = 揃
  - - ぬ/力 + ら/月 + ぬ/力 = 剪
  - - ち/竹 + ら/月 + ぬ/力 = 箭
  - - む/車 + ら/月 + ぬ/力 = 翦
- - を/貝 + ぬ/力 = 則
  - - 仁/亻 + ぬ/力 = 側
  - - る/忄 + ぬ/力 = 惻
  - - 氷/氵 + ぬ/力 = 測
  - - よ/广 + を/貝 + ぬ/力 = 厠
- - め/目 + ぬ/力 = 刈
  - - く/艹 + め/目 + ぬ/力 = 苅
- - か/金 + ぬ/力 = 刊
- - の/禾 + ぬ/力 = 利
  - - な/亻 + の/禾 + ぬ/力 = 俐
  - - る/忄 + の/禾 + ぬ/力 = 悧
  - - 心 + の/禾 + ぬ/力 = 梨
  - - そ/馬 + の/禾 + ぬ/力 = 犁
  - - む/車 + の/禾 + ぬ/力 = 蜊
  - - せ/食 + の/禾 + ぬ/力 = 鯏
  - - 心 + 宿 + ぬ/力 = 莉
- - ゆ/彳 + ぬ/力 = 到
  - - き/木 + ゆ/彳 + ぬ/力 = 椡
- - せ/食 + ぬ/力 = 制
- - し/巿 + ぬ/力 = 刷
- - き/木 + ぬ/力 = 刺
  - - selector 1 + き/木 + ぬ/力 = 剌
    - - れ/口 + き/木 + ぬ/力 = 喇
    - - に/氵 + き/木 + ぬ/力 = 溂
- - ⺼ + ぬ/力 = 削
- - ま/石 + ぬ/力 = 剖
- - み/耳 + ぬ/力 = 剥
- - ふ/女 + ぬ/力 = 副
- - 宿 + ぬ/力 = 割
- - お/頁 + ぬ/力 = 創
- - へ/⺩ + ぬ/力 = 班
- - や/疒 + ぬ/力 = 痢
- - 心 + ぬ/力 = 薊
- - ぬ/力 + つ/土 = 型
- - ぬ/力 + 数 + せ/食 = 刋
- - ぬ/力 + selector 4 + 数 = 刎
- - ぬ/力 + 宿 + て/扌 = 刔
- - ぬ/力 + 宿 + へ/⺩ = 刪
- - ぬ/力 + れ/口 + せ/食 = 刮
- - ぬ/力 + 宿 + け/犬 = 刳
- - ぬ/力 + ゆ/彳 + 宿 = 剃
- - ろ/十 + 宿 + ぬ/力 = 剋
- - ぬ/力 + 日 + 数 = 剔
- - ぬ/力 + け/犬 + か/金 = 剞
- - ぬ/力 + と/戸 + 宿 = 剳
- - ぬ/力 + 宿 + や/疒 = 剴
- - ぬ/力 + に/氵 + ね/示 = 剽
- - ぬ/力 + ふ/女 + た/⽥ = 劃
- - か/金 + 宿 + ぬ/力 = 劉
- - よ/广 + 宿 + ぬ/力 = 廁
- - に/氵 + 龸 + ぬ/力 = 渕

==== Compounds of 刃 and 刄 ====
- - ぬ/力 + 心 = 忍
  - - ゑ/訁 + ぬ/力 = 認
  - - い/糹/#2 + ぬ/力 + 心 = 綛
  - - 心 + ぬ/力 + 心 = 荵
- - な/亻 + selector 1 + ぬ/力 = 仞
- - と/戸 + selector 1 + ぬ/力 = 靭
- - と/戸 + ぬ/力 = 靱
- - 仁/亻 + selector 1 + ぬ/力 = 仭
- - て/扌 + selector 1 + ぬ/力 = 扨
- - の/禾 + selector 1 + ぬ/力 = 籾
- - か/金 + selector 1 + ぬ/力 = 釼
- - と/戸 + う/宀/#3 + ぬ/力 = 剏
- - ぬ/力 + selector 1 + ⺼ = 衂

==== Compounds of 刀 ====
- - ぬ/力 + 囗 = 召
  - - て/扌 + ぬ/力 = 招
  - - 日 + ぬ/力 = 昭
  - - に/氵 + ぬ/力 = 沼
  - - い/糹/#2 + ぬ/力 = 紹
  - - え/訁 + ぬ/力 = 詔
  - - は/辶 + ぬ/力 = 超
  - - ぬ/力 + ぬ/力 + 囗 = 劭
  - - そ/馬 + ぬ/力 + 囗 = 貂
  - - ひ/辶 + ぬ/力 + 囗 = 迢
  - - さ/阝 + ぬ/力 + 囗 = 邵
  - - ま/石 + ぬ/力 + 囗 = 韶
  - - と/戸 + ぬ/力 + 囗 = 髫
  - - な/亻 + 宿 + ぬ/力 = 仂
  - - ぬ/力 + ぬ/力 + 囗 = 劭
- - れ/口 + ぬ/力 = 切
  - - ま/石 + れ/口 + ぬ/力 = 砌
- - ね/示 + ぬ/力 = 初
- - け/犬 + ぬ/力 = 券
  - - け/犬 + け/犬 + ぬ/力 = 劵
    - - き/木 + け/犬 + ぬ/力 = 椦
- - う/宀/#3 + ぬ/力 = 寡
- - ひ/辶 + ぬ/力 = 辺
- - ぬ/力 + け/犬 = 契
  - - 囗 + ぬ/力 = 喫
  - - き/木 + ぬ/力 + け/犬 = 楔
  - - ね/示 + ぬ/力 + け/犬 = 禊
- - ぬ/力 + ⺼ = 盆
- - れ/口 + selector 4 + ぬ/力 = 叨
- - や/疒 + selector 4 + ぬ/力 = 屶
- - て/扌 + selector 4 + ぬ/力 = 挈
- - き/木 + selector 4 + ぬ/力 = 朷
- - 心 + selector 4 + ぬ/力 = 茘
- - か/金 + selector 4 + ぬ/力 = 釖
- - ぬ/力 + 宿 + こ/子 = 刧
- - ぬ/力 + 宿 + ま/石 = 劈
- - き/木 + 龸 + ぬ/力 = 枴
- - て/扌 + 宿 + ぬ/力 = 拐

==== Compounds of 臼 ====
- - ぬ/力 + の/禾 = 毀
  - - 火 + ぬ/力 + の/禾 = 燬
- - け/犬 + selector 6 + ぬ/力 = 舂
- - 氷/氵 + 宿 + ぬ/力 = 滔
- - れ/口 + 宿 + ぬ/力 = 啗
- - ぬ/力 + 宿 + と/戸 = 舁
- - え/訁 + 宿 + ぬ/力 = 諂
- - み/耳 + 宿 + ぬ/力 = 蹈
- - も/門 + 宿 + ぬ/力 = 閻
- - さ/阝 + さ/阝 + ぬ/力 = 陷
- - い/糹/#2 + 宿 + ぬ/力 = 韜
- - せ/食 + 宿 + ぬ/力 = 餡

==== Compounds of 匁 ====
- - selector 1 + 比 + ぬ/力 = 匆

==== Compounds of 免 ====
- - ぬ/力 + ぬ/力 = 勉
- - な/亻 + ぬ/力 + 宿 = 俛
- - 日 + ぬ/力 + 宿 = 冕
- - ふ/女 + ぬ/力 + 宿 = 娩
- - う/宀/#3 + ぬ/力 + 宿 = 寃
- - や/疒 + ぬ/力 + 宿 = 巉
- - る/忄 + ぬ/力 + 宿 = 悗
- - い/糹/#2 + ぬ/力 + 宿 = 纔
- - 心 + ぬ/力 + 宿 = 菟
- - え/訁 + ぬ/力 + 宿 = 讒

==== Other compounds ====
- - む/車 + ぬ/力 = 蠢
- - さ/阝 + ぬ/力 = 陥
- - ぬ/力 + は/辶 = 畔
- - ぬ/力 + ゆ/彳 = 粛
  - - い/糹/#2 + ぬ/力 + ゆ/彳 = 繍
  - - ぬ/力 + ぬ/力 + ゆ/彳 = 肅
    - - れ/口 + ぬ/力 + ゆ/彳 = 嘯
    - - に/氵 + ぬ/力 + ゆ/彳 = 瀟
    - - ち/竹 + ぬ/力 + ゆ/彳 = 簫
    - - 心 + ぬ/力 + ゆ/彳 = 蕭
- - ぬ/力 + ぬ/力 + 数 = 敕
- - ち/竹 + ち/竹 + ぬ/力 = 效
- - 火 + 宿 + ぬ/力 = 焔
- - ぬ/力 + ん/止 + の/禾 = 齧
- - ひ/辶 + 宿 + ぬ/力 = 邉
- - ひ/辶 + ひ/辶 + ぬ/力 = 邊
- - に/氵 + 宿 + ぬ/力 = 淵
- - に/氵 + う/宀/#3 + ぬ/力 = 渊
