= Braille pattern dots-1245 =

Braille pattern

6-dot braille cells
⠀	⠁	⠃	⠉	⠙	⠑	⠋	⠛	⠓	⠊	⠚	⠈	⠘
⠄	⠅	⠇	⠍	⠝	⠕	⠏	⠟	⠗	⠎	⠞	⠌	⠜
⠤	⠥	⠧	⠭	⠽	⠵	⠯	⠿	⠷	⠮	⠾	⠬	⠼
⠠	⠡	⠣	⠩	⠹	⠱	⠫	⠻	⠳	⠪	⠺	⠨	⠸
shift down	⠂	⠆	⠒	⠲	⠢	⠖	⠶	⠦	⠔	⠴	⠐	⠰

The Braille pattern dots-1245 ( ⠛ ) is a 6-dot or 8-dot braille cell with the top four dots raised. It is represented by the Unicode code point U+281b, and in Braille ASCII with G.

Character information
Preview	⠛ (braille pattern dots-1245)	
Unicode name	BRAILLE PATTERN DOTS-1245	
Encodings	decimal	hex
Unicode	10267	U+281B
UTF-8	226 160 155	E2 A0 9B
Numeric character reference	&#10267;	&#x281B;
Braille ASCII	71	47

== Unified Braille ==
In unified international braille, the braille pattern dots-1245 is used to represent a voiced velar plosive, i.e. /g/, and is otherwise assigned as needed. It is also used for the number 7.

=== Table of unified braille values ===
French Braille	G, "qui"
English Braille	G
English Contraction	go
German Braille	G
Bharati Braille	ग / ਗ / ગ / গ / ଗ / గ / ಗ / ഗ / ග / گ
Icelandic Braille	G
IPA Braille	/g/
Russian Braille	Г
Slovak Braille	G
Persian Braille	گ
Irish Braille	G
Thai Braille	ก k
Luxembourgish Braille	g (minuscule)

== Other braille ==
Japanese Braille	re / れ / レ
Korean Braille	un / 운
Mainland Chinese Braille	g, j
Taiwanese Braille	r / ㄖ
Two-Cell Chinese Braille	s- -ài
Algerian Braille	خ

== Plus dots 7 and 8 ==
Related to Braille pattern dots-1245 are Braille patterns 12457, 12458, and 124578, which are used in 8-dot braille systems, such as Gardner-Salinas and Luxembourgish Braille.

Character information
Preview	⡛ (braille pattern dots-12457)		⢛ (braille pattern dots-12458)		⣛ (braille pattern dots-124578)	
Unicode name	BRAILLE PATTERN DOTS-12457		BRAILLE PATTERN DOTS-12458		BRAILLE PATTERN DOTS-124578	
Encodings	decimal	hex	dec	hex	dec	hex
Unicode	10331	U+285B	10395	U+289B	10459	U+28DB
UTF-8	226 161 155	E2 A1 9B	226 162 155	E2 A2 9B	226 163 155	E2 A3 9B
Numeric character reference	&#10331;	&#x285B;	&#10395;	&#x289B;	&#10459;	&#x28DB;

	dots 12457	dots 12458	dots 124578
Gardner Salinas Braille	G (capital)	γ (gamma)	Γ (Gamma)
Luxembourgish Braille	G (capital)		

== Related 8-dot kantenji patterns ==
In the Japanese kantenji braille, the standard 8-dot Braille patterns 2356, 12356, 23456, and 123456 are the patterns related to Braille pattern dots-1245, since the two additional dots of kantenji patterns 01245, 12457, and 012457 are placed above the base 6-dot cell, instead of below, as in standard 8-dot braille.

Character information
Preview	⠶ (braille pattern dots-2356)		⠷ (braille pattern dots-12356)		⠾ (braille pattern dots-23456)		⠿ (braille pattern dots-123456)	
Unicode name	BRAILLE PATTERN DOTS-2356		BRAILLE PATTERN DOTS-12356		BRAILLE PATTERN DOTS-23456		BRAILLE PATTERN DOTS-123456	
Encodings	decimal	hex	dec	hex	dec	hex	dec	hex
Unicode	10294	U+2836	10295	U+2837	10302	U+283E	10303	U+283F
UTF-8	226 160 182	E2 A0 B6	226 160 183	E2 A0 B7	226 160 190	E2 A0 BE	226 160 191	E2 A0 BF
Numeric character reference	&#10294;	&#x2836;	&#10295;	&#x2837;	&#10302;	&#x283E;	&#10303;	&#x283F;

=== Kantenji using braille patterns 2356, 12356, 23456, or 123456 ===
This listing includes kantenji using Braille pattern dots-1245 for all 6349 kanji found in JIS C 6226-1978.

- - 口

==== Variants and thematic compounds ====
- - れ/口 + selector 1 = 唖
- - selector 1 + selector 1 + ぬ/力 = 刄
- - れ/口 + selector 4 = 味
- - selector 6 + れ/口 = 鬲
- - 数 + #7 = 七
- - 比 + れ/口 = 凸

==== Compounds of 口 ====
- - れ/口 + ろ/十 = 古
  - - ち/竹 + れ/口 = 箇
  - - れ/口 + 氷/氵 = 故
  - - な/亻 + れ/口 + ろ/十 = 估
  - - ふ/女 + れ/口 + ろ/十 = 姑
  - - る/忄 + れ/口 + ろ/十 = 怙
  - - に/氵 + れ/口 + ろ/十 = 沽
  - - す/発 + れ/口 + ろ/十 = 罟
  - - 心 + れ/口 + ろ/十 = 葫
  - - む/車 + れ/口 + ろ/十 = 蛄
  - - え/訁 + れ/口 + ろ/十 = 詁
  - - ろ/十 + れ/口 + ろ/十 = 辜
  - - せ/食 + れ/口 + ろ/十 = 醐
  - - か/金 + れ/口 + ろ/十 = 鈷
  - - ろ/十 + れ/口 + 宿 = 兢
- - れ/口 + 宿 + き/木 = 呆
  - - な/亻 + れ/口 = 保
    - - つ/土 + な/亻 + れ/口 = 堡
    - - く/艹 + な/亻 + れ/口 = 葆
    - - ね/示 + な/亻 + れ/口 = 褓
  - - 龸 + な/亻 + れ/口 = 襃
- - ぬ/力 + れ/口 = 加
  - - れ/口 + selector 4 + ぬ/力 = 叨
  - - 仁/亻 + れ/口 = 伽
  - - れ/口 + き/木 = 架
  - - き/木 + ぬ/力 + れ/口 = 枷
  - - へ/⺩ + ぬ/力 + れ/口 = 珈
  - - や/疒 + ぬ/力 + れ/口 = 痂
  - - ち/竹 + ぬ/力 + れ/口 = 笳
  - - 心 + ぬ/力 + れ/口 = 茄
  - - ね/示 + ぬ/力 + れ/口 = 袈
  - - み/耳 + ぬ/力 + れ/口 = 跏
  - - ひ/辶 + ぬ/力 + れ/口 = 迦
  - - そ/馬 + ぬ/力 + れ/口 = 駕
- - す/発 + れ/口 = 各
  - - 宿 + れ/口 = 客
    - - れ/口 + 宿 + れ/口 = 喀
  - - き/木 + れ/口 = 格
  - - に/氵 + れ/口 = 洛
    - - く/艹 + れ/口 = 落
  - - み/耳 + れ/口 = 路
    - - 心 + み/耳 + れ/口 = 蕗
  - - た/⽥ + れ/口 = 略
  - - た/⽥ + た/⽥ + れ/口 = 畧
  - - い/糹/#2 + れ/口 = 絡
  - - れ/口 + す/発 + れ/口 = 咯
  - - る/忄 + す/発 + れ/口 = 恪
  - - て/扌 + す/発 + れ/口 = 挌
  - - 火 + す/発 + れ/口 = 烙
  - - へ/⺩ + す/発 + れ/口 = 珞
  - - く/艹 + す/発 + れ/口 = 茖
  - - け/犬 + す/発 + れ/口 = 貉
  - - を/貝 + す/発 + れ/口 = 賂
  - - む/車 + す/発 + れ/口 = 輅
- - つ/土 + れ/口 = 吉
  - - ゑ/訁 + れ/口 = 詰
  - - ゐ/幺 + れ/口 = 結
  - - な/亻 + つ/土 + れ/口 = 佶
    - - な/亻 + れ/口 + 氷/氵 = 做
  - - ぬ/力 + つ/土 + れ/口 = 劼
  - - て/扌 + つ/土 + れ/口 = 拮
  - - き/木 + つ/土 + れ/口 = 桔
  - - い/糹/#2 + つ/土 + れ/口 = 纈
  - - ね/示 + つ/土 + れ/口 = 襭
- - ほ/方 + れ/口 = 名
  - - か/金 + れ/口 = 銘
  - - 心 + ほ/方 + れ/口 = 茗
- - よ/广 + れ/口 = 后
  - - え/訁 + よ/广 + れ/口 = 詬
  - - つ/土 + 宿 + れ/口 = 垢
- - り/分 + れ/口 = 含
  - - く/艹 + り/分 + れ/口 = 莟
- - ら/月 + れ/口 = 吾
  - - る/忄 + れ/口 = 悟
  - - れ/口 + ら/月 + れ/口 = 唔
  - - 囗 + ら/月 + れ/口 = 圄
  - - う/宀/#3 + ら/月 + れ/口 = 寤
  - - 日 + ら/月 + れ/口 = 晤
  - - 心 + ら/月 + れ/口 = 梧
  - - そ/馬 + ら/月 + れ/口 = 牾
  - - へ/⺩ + ら/月 + れ/口 = 珸
  - - ゆ/彳 + ら/月 + れ/口 = 衙
- - し/巿 + れ/口 = 呻
- - の/禾 + れ/口 = 和
  - - れ/口 + の/禾 + れ/口 = 啝
- - を/貝 + れ/口 = 員
  - - て/扌 + れ/口 = 損
  - - ま/石 + れ/口 = 韻
  - - ほ/方 + を/貝 + れ/口 = 殞
- - ろ/十 + れ/口 = 唇
- - も/門 + れ/口 = 問
- - と/戸 + れ/口 = 啓
- - そ/馬 + れ/口 = 善
  - - ⺼ + れ/口 = 膳
- - 火 + れ/口 = 嘘
- - け/犬 + れ/口 = 器
- - 囗 + れ/口 = 回
  - - は/辶 + れ/口 = 廻
  - - ゆ/彳 + 囗 + れ/口 = 徊
  - - く/艹 + 囗 + れ/口 = 茴
  - - む/車 + 囗 + れ/口 = 蛔
  - - な/亻 + 囗 + れ/口 = 嗇
    - - 心 + 囗 + れ/口 = 薔
    - - つ/土 + 囗 + れ/口 = 墻
    - - き/木 + 囗 + れ/口 = 檣
    - - ふ/女 + 囗 + れ/口 = 艢
  - - ね/示 + 囗 + れ/口 = 禀
    - - 氷/氵 + 宿 + れ/口 = 凛
  - - の/禾 + 囗 + れ/口 = 稟
    - - よ/广 + 囗 + れ/口 = 廩
    - - る/忄 + 囗 + れ/口 = 懍
  - - て/扌 + 囗 + れ/口 = 擅
- - ふ/女 + れ/口 = 如
  - - に/氵 + ふ/女 + れ/口 = 洳
  - - い/糹/#2 + ふ/女 + れ/口 = 絮
  - - く/艹 + ふ/女 + れ/口 = 茹
- - 心 + れ/口 = 杏
- - や/疒 + れ/口 = 知
  - - き/木 + や/疒 + れ/口 = 椥
  - - み/耳 + や/疒 + れ/口 = 聟
  - - む/車 + や/疒 + れ/口 = 蜘
- - お/頁 + れ/口 = 顎
- - れ/口 + 宿 = 兄
- - れ/口 + ね/示 = 別
  - - て/扌 + れ/口 + ね/示 = 捌
- - れ/口 + と/戸 = 占
  - - れ/口 + 火 = 点
  - - や/疒 + れ/口 + と/戸 = 岾
  - - て/扌 + れ/口 + と/戸 = 拈
  - - に/氵 + れ/口 + と/戸 = 沾
  - - ま/石 + れ/口 + と/戸 = 砧
  - - ち/竹 + れ/口 + と/戸 = 笘
  - - く/艹 + れ/口 + と/戸 = 苫
  - - せ/食 + れ/口 + と/戸 = 鮎
  - - の/禾 + れ/口 + と/戸 = 黏
  - - れ/口 + れ/口 + 火 = 點
  - - れ/口 + め/目 + 宿 = 覘
- - れ/口 + は/辶 = 只
  - - た/⽥ + れ/口 + は/辶 = 咫
  - - 心 + れ/口 + は/辶 = 枳
- - れ/口 + さ/阝 = 叫
- - れ/口 + ひ/辶 = 叱
- - れ/口 + な/亻 = 史
  - - そ/馬 + れ/口 + な/亻 = 駛
- - れ/口 + す/発 = 号
  - - れ/口 + れ/口 + す/発 = 號
    - - せ/食 + れ/口 + す/発 = 饕
- - れ/口 + 仁/亻 = 吏
- - れ/口 + つ/土 = 吐
  - - れ/口 + つ/土 + つ/土 = 哇
- - れ/口 + り/分 = 吟
- - れ/口 + ゐ/幺 = 吸
- - れ/口 + ん/止 = 吹
- - れ/口 + 数 = 吻
- - れ/口 + へ/⺩ = 呈
  - - ひ/辶 + れ/口 + へ/⺩ = 逞
  - - さ/阝 + れ/口 + へ/⺩ = 郢
  - - せ/食 + れ/口 + へ/⺩ = 酲
  - - れ/口 + へ/⺩ + と/戸 = 哢
  - - れ/口 + へ/⺩ + を/貝 = 嘖
- - れ/口 + や/疒 = 呼
- - れ/口 + け/犬 = 咲
- - れ/口 + う/宀/#3 = 品
  - - や/疒 + れ/口 + う/宀/#3 = 嵒
  - - る/忄 + れ/口 + う/宀/#3 = 懆
  - - に/氵 + れ/口 + う/宀/#3 = 澡
  - - え/訁 + れ/口 + う/宀/#3 = 譟
- - れ/口 + そ/馬 = 哨
- - れ/口 + を/貝 = 哲
- - れ/口 + ほ/方 = 哺
- - れ/口 + の/禾 = 唆
- - れ/口 + い/糹/#2 = 唯
- - れ/口 + 日 = 唱
- - れ/口 + る/忄 = 唸
- - れ/口 + ゑ/訁 = 啜
- - れ/口 + こ/子 = 喉
- - れ/口 + よ/广 = 喋
- - れ/口 + ⺼ = 喚
- - れ/口 + ゆ/彳 = 喩
- - れ/口 + め/目 = 嗅
- - れ/口 + に/氵 = 嗜
- - れ/口 + く/艹 = 嘆
- - れ/口 + も/門 = 嘔
- - れ/口 + み/耳 = 嘱
- - れ/口 + ふ/女 = 噴
- - れ/口 + ま/石 = 噺
- - れ/口 + か/金 = 嚇
- - れ/口 + 龸 = 囃
- - れ/口 + し/巿 = 尋
  - - に/氵 + れ/口 + し/巿 = 潯
  - - 心 + れ/口 + し/巿 = 蕁
- - れ/口 + 心 = 患
- - れ/口 + せ/食 = 舌
  - - れ/口 + ち/竹 = 筈
  - - れ/口 + て/扌 = 括
  - - ぬ/力 + れ/口 + せ/食 = 刮
  - - る/忄 + れ/口 + せ/食 = 恬
  - - み/耳 + れ/口 + せ/食 = 聒
  - - ん/止 + れ/口 + せ/食 = 舐
- - む/車 + れ/口 + せ/食 = 蛞
  - - か/金 + れ/口 + せ/食 = 銛
  - - も/門 + れ/口 + せ/食 = 闊
- - れ/口 + 数 + り/分 = 叭
- - れ/口 + 数 + て/扌 = 叮
- - れ/口 + 宿 + ろ/十 = 叶
- - れ/口 + 比 + な/亻 = 叺
- - れ/口 + selector 1 + か/金 = 吁
- - れ/口 + 龸 + お/頁 = 吃
- - れ/口 + 比 + し/巿 = 吋
- - れ/口 + 龸 + selector 3 = 吝
- - け/犬 + 宿 + れ/口 = 吠
- - れ/口 + 宿 + り/分 = 吩
- - れ/口 + 比 + を/貝 = 听
- - れ/口 + selector 5 + 宿 = 吭
- - れ/口 + 宿 + む/車 = 吮
- - れ/口 + 囗 + 仁/亻 = 吶
- - れ/口 + こ/子 + を/貝 = 吼
- - れ/口 + そ/馬 + selector 1 = 吽
- - れ/口 + selector 4 + め/目 = 呀
- - れ/口 + 比 + た/⽥ = 呎
- - れ/口 + 比 + selector 4 = 呰
- - れ/口 + 心 + つ/土 = 呱
- - な/亻 + れ/口 + う/宀/#3 = 侃
- - れ/口 + れ/口 + み/耳 = 囑
- - き/木 + れ/口 + み/耳 = 楫
- - れ/口 + ふ/女 + ゑ/訁 = 呶
- - れ/口 + 数 + こ/子 = 呷
- - れ/口 + selector 5 + そ/馬 = 咀
- - れ/口 + 比 + へ/⺩ = 咄
- - れ/口 + も/門 + selector 2 = 咆
- - れ/口 + 宿 + さ/阝 = 咋
- - れ/口 + 宿 + す/発 = 咎
- - れ/口 + 氷/氵 + selector 4 = 咏
- - れ/口 + な/亻 + し/巿 = 咐
- - れ/口 + selector 6 + 龸 = 咒
- - れ/口 + う/宀/#3 + な/亻 = 咤
- - れ/口 + selector 4 + ゆ/彳 = 咥
- - れ/口 + 氷/氵 + ん/止 = 咨
- - れ/口 + 龸 + ち/竹 = 咬
- - れ/口 + 宿 + ゐ/幺 = 咳
- - れ/口 + 囗 + け/犬 = 咽
- - れ/口 + と/戸 + selector 2 = 咾
- - れ/口 + 比 + に/氵 = 哂
- - れ/口 + selector 4 + こ/子 = 哄
- - れ/口 + り/分 + 囗 = 哈
- - れ/口 + 宿 + ゆ/彳 = 哘
- - れ/口 + 囗 + selector 1 = 哦
- - れ/口 + 比 + り/分 = 哩
- - れ/口 + 宿 + け/犬 = 哭
- - れ/口 + と/戸 + こ/子 = 哮
- - れ/口 + 日 + な/亻 = 哽
- - れ/口 + 宿 + ん/止 = 唄
- - れ/口 + め/目 + し/巿 = 唏
- - れ/口 + 宿 + い/糹/#2 = 售
- - れ/口 + と/戸 + け/犬 = 唳
- - れ/口 + ほ/方 + 龸 = 唹
- - れ/口 + 宿 + に/氵 = 唾
- - れ/口 + 宿 + つ/土 = 啀
- - れ/口 + そ/馬 + selector 3 = 啄
- - れ/口 + 日 + と/戸 = 啅
- - れ/口 + う/宀/#3 + き/木 = 啌
- - れ/口 + 火 + 火 = 啖
- - れ/口 + 宿 + ぬ/力 = 啗
- - れ/口 + ん/止 + さ/阝 = 啣
- - れ/口 + ま/石 + し/巿 = 啼
- - れ/口 + の/禾 + 火 = 啾
- - れ/口 + 比 + み/耳 = 喃
- - れ/口 + き/木 + ぬ/力 = 喇
- - れ/口 + ひ/辶 + selector 3 = 喊
- - れ/口 + 宿 + の/禾 = 喘
- - れ/口 + 龸 + そ/馬 = 喙
- - れ/口 + 宿 + 氷/氵 = 喝
- - れ/口 + す/発 + さ/阝 = 喞
- - れ/口 + た/⽥ + ⺼ = 喟
- - れ/口 + う/宀/#3 + 日 = 喧
- - れ/口 + う/宀/#3 + 囗 = 喨
- - れ/口 + せ/食 + せ/食 = 喰
- - れ/口 + お/頁 + す/発 = 嗄
- - れ/口 + selector 1 + め/目 = 嗔
- - れ/口 + せ/食 + う/宀/#3 = 嗚
- - れ/口 + そ/馬 + こ/子 = 嗟
- - れ/口 + む/車 + selector 1 = 嗤
- - れ/口 + 宿 + ほ/方 = 嗷
- - れ/口 + ひ/辶 + む/車 = 嗹
- - れ/口 + ほ/方 + や/疒 = 嗾
- - れ/口 + 心 + ま/石 = 嘛
- - れ/口 + く/艹 + か/金 = 嘩
- - れ/口 + ぬ/力 + ゆ/彳 = 嘯
- - れ/口 + 囗 + selector 6 = 嘴
- - れ/口 + 宿 + を/貝 = 嘶
- - れ/口 + む/車 + 火 = 嘸
- - れ/口 + 宿 + そ/馬 = 噌
- - れ/口 + る/忄 + selector 1 = 噎
- - け/犬 + け/犬 + れ/口 = 噐
- - れ/口 + ん/止 + の/禾 = 噛
- - れ/口 + き/木 + ね/示 = 噤
- - れ/口 + 宿 + う/宀/#3 = 噪
- - れ/口 + selector 1 + な/亻 = 噫
- - れ/口 + 仁/亻 + ふ/女 = 噬
- - れ/口 + お/頁 + ふ/女 = 噸
- - れ/口 + 宿 + て/扌 = 嚀
- - れ/口 + 比 + え/訁 = 嚆
- - れ/口 + め/目 + た/⽥ = 嚊
- - れ/口 + 宿 + め/目 = 嚏
- - れ/口 + う/宀/#3 + め/目 = 嚔
- - れ/口 + 宿 + か/金 = 嚠
- - れ/口 + 宿 + せ/食 = 嚥
- - れ/口 + ふ/女 + を/貝 = 嚶
- - れ/口 + 龸 + や/疒 = 嚼
- - れ/口 + む/車 + て/扌 = 囀
- - れ/口 + 宿 + お/頁 = 囂
- - れ/口 + く/艹 + え/訁 = 囈
- - れ/口 + を/貝 + そ/馬 = 囎
- - ま/石 + ぬ/力 + 囗 = 韶
- - さ/阝 + ぬ/力 + 囗 = 邵
- - れ/口 + 宿 + ぬ/力 = 啗
- - て/扌 + 宿 + れ/口 = 揖
- - 火 + 囗 + れ/口 = 烱
- - い/糹/#2 + 囗 + れ/口 = 絅
- - む/車 + 宿 + れ/口 = 轡

==== Compounds of 鬲 ====
- - さ/阝 + れ/口 = 隔
- - れ/口 + む/車 = 融
- - 龸 + れ/口 = 京
  - - 日 + れ/口 = 景
    - - る/忄 + 日 + れ/口 = 憬
  - - 氷/氵 + れ/口 = 涼
    - - 氷/氵 + 氷/氵 + れ/口 = 凉
  - - せ/食 + れ/口 = 鯨
  - - え/訁 + れ/口 = 諒
  - - selector 1 + 龸 + れ/口 = 亰
  - - ぬ/力 + 龸 + れ/口 = 勍
  - - て/扌 + 龸 + れ/口 = 掠
  - - 心 + 龸 + れ/口 = 椋

==== Compounds of 七 ====
- - れ/口 + ぬ/力 = 切
  - - う/宀/#3 + れ/口 = 窃
  - - ま/石 + れ/口 + ぬ/力 = 砌

==== Other compounds ====
- - れ/口 + れ/口 = 単
  - - れ/口 + れ/口 + れ/口 = 單
    - - ふ/女 + れ/口 + れ/口 = 嬋
    - - れ/口 + れ/口 + 囗 = 戰
    - - ね/示 + れ/口 + れ/口 = 襌
    - - さ/阝 + れ/口 + れ/口 = 鄲
    - - も/門 + れ/口 + れ/口 = 闡
    - - る/忄 + れ/口 + れ/口 = 憚
    - - ほ/方 + れ/口 + れ/口 = 殫
  - - ゆ/彳 + れ/口 = 弾
    - - ゆ/彳 + ゆ/彳 + れ/口 = 彈
  - - ね/示 + れ/口 = 禅
    - - ね/示 + ね/示 + れ/口 = 禪
  - - む/車 + れ/口 = 蝉
  - - れ/口 + 囗 = 戦
  - - ち/竹 + れ/口 + れ/口 = 箪
  - - そ/馬 + れ/口 + れ/口 = 騨
  - - ね/示 + 宿 + れ/口 = 褝
- - い/糹/#2 + と/戸 + れ/口 = 綮
- - ふ/女 + と/戸 + れ/口 = 肇
- - れ/口 + 宿 + 囗 = 串
- - 囗 + 囗 + れ/口 = 囘
- - 心 + 宿 + れ/口 = 梔
- - う/宀/#3 + う/宀/#3 + れ/口 = 竊
- - そ/馬 + そ/馬 + れ/口 = 譱
- - か/金 + ぬ/力 + そ/馬 = 鋤
- - り/分 + れ/口 + れ/口 = 龠
