= Braille pattern dots-1346 =

Braille pattern

6-dot braille cells
| ⠀ | ⠁ | ⠃ | ⠉ | ⠙ | ⠑ | ⠋ | ⠛ | ⠓ | ⠊ | ⠚ | ⠈ | ⠘ |
| ⠄ | ⠅ | ⠇ | ⠍ | ⠝ | ⠕ | ⠏ | ⠟ | ⠗ | ⠎ | ⠞ | ⠌ | ⠜ |
| ⠤ | ⠥ | ⠧ | ⠭ | ⠽ | ⠵ | ⠯ | ⠿ | ⠷ | ⠮ | ⠾ | ⠬ | ⠼ |
| ⠠ | ⠡ | ⠣ | ⠩ | ⠹ | ⠱ | ⠫ | ⠻ | ⠳ | ⠪ | ⠺ | ⠨ | ⠸ |
| shift down | ⠂ | ⠆ | ⠒ | ⠲ | ⠢ | ⠖ | ⠶ | ⠦ | ⠔ | ⠴ | ⠐ | ⠰ |

The Braille pattern dots-1346 ( ⠭ ) is a 6-dot braille cell with both top and both bottom dots raised, or an 8-dot braille cell with both top and both lower-middle dots raised. It is represented by the Unicode code point U+282d, and in Braille ASCII with an X.

Character information
| Preview | ⠭ (braille pattern dots-1346) | |
|---|---|---|
| Unicode name | BRAILLE PATTERN DOTS-1346 | |
| Encodings | decimal | hex |
| Unicode | 10285 | U+282D |
| UTF-8 | 226 160 173 | E2 A0 AD |
| Numeric character reference | &#10285; | &#x282D; |
| Braille ASCII | 88 | 58 |

== Unified Braille ==
In unified international braille, the braille pattern dots-1346 is used to represent a voiceless velar fricative, i.e. /x/, or otherwise as needed.

=== Table of unified braille values ===
| French Braille | X, ex, "mais" |
| English Braille | X |
| English Contraction | it |
| German Braille | X, mm |
| Bharati Braille | ऒ / ਖ਼ / ఒ / ಒ / ഒ / ஒ / ඔ / خ |
| Icelandic Braille | X |
| IPA Braille | /x/ |
| Russian Braille | Щ |
| Slovak Braille | X |
| Arabic Braille | خ |
| Persian Braille | خ |
| Irish Braille | X |
| Thai Braille | ฝ f |
| Luxembourgish Braille | x (minuscule) |

== Other braille ==
| Japanese Braille | fu / ふ / フ |
| Korean Braille | og / 옥 |
| Mainland Chinese Braille | yang, -iang |
| Taiwanese Braille | ang / ㄤ |
| Two-Cell Chinese Braille | chu- -ǒu, 有 yǒu |
| Algerian Braille | ل |

== Plus dots 7 and 8 ==
Related to Braille pattern dots-1346 are Braille patterns 13467, 13468, and 134678, which are used in 8-dot braille systems, such as Gardner-Salinas and Luxembourgish Braille.

Character information
| Preview | ⡭ (braille pattern dots-13467) | | ⢭ (braille pattern dots-13468) | | ⣭ (braille pattern dots-134678) | |
|---|---|---|---|---|---|---|
| Unicode name | BRAILLE PATTERN DOTS-13467 | | BRAILLE PATTERN DOTS-13468 | | BRAILLE PATTERN DOTS-134678 | |
| Encodings | decimal | hex | dec | hex | dec | hex |
| Unicode | 10349 | U+286D | 10413 | U+28AD | 10477 | U+28ED |
| UTF-8 | 226 161 173 | E2 A1 AD | 226 162 173 | E2 A2 AD | 226 163 173 | E2 A3 AD |
| Numeric character reference | &#10349; | &#x286D; | &#10413; | &#x28AD; | &#10477; | &#x28ED; |

| | dots 13467 | dots 13468 | dots 134678 |
|---|---|---|---|
| Gardner Salinas Braille | X (capital) | ξ (xi) | Ξ (Xi) |
| Luxembourgish Braille | X (capital) | | |

== Related 8-dot kantenji patterns ==
In the Japanese kantenji braille, the standard 8-dot Braille patterns 2578, 12578, 24578, and 124578 are the patterns related to Braille pattern dots-1346, since the two additional dots of kantenji patterns 01346, 13467, and 013467 are placed above the base 6-dot cell, instead of below, as in standard 8-dot braille.

Character information
| Preview | ⣒ (braille pattern dots-2578) | | ⣓ (braille pattern dots-12578) | | ⣚ (braille pattern dots-24578) | | ⣛ (braille pattern dots-124578) | |
|---|---|---|---|---|---|---|---|---|
| Unicode name | BRAILLE PATTERN DOTS-2578 | | BRAILLE PATTERN DOTS-12578 | | BRAILLE PATTERN DOTS-24578 | | BRAILLE PATTERN DOTS-124578 | |
| Encodings | decimal | hex | dec | hex | dec | hex | dec | hex |
| Unicode | 10450 | U+28D2 | 10451 | U+28D3 | 10458 | U+28DA | 10459 | U+28DB |
| UTF-8 | 226 163 146 | E2 A3 92 | 226 163 147 | E2 A3 93 | 226 163 154 | E2 A3 9A | 226 163 155 | E2 A3 9B |
| Numeric character reference | &#10450; | &#x28D2; | &#10451; | &#x28D3; | &#10458; | &#x28DA; | &#10459; | &#x28DB; |

=== Kantenji using braille patterns 2578, 12578, 24578, or 124578 ===
This listing includes kantenji using Braille pattern dots-1346 for all 6349 kanji found in JIS C 6226-1978.

- - 女

==== Variants and thematic compounds ====
- - selector 3 + ふ/女 = 聿
- - selector 4 + ふ/女 = 不
- - selector 5 + ふ/女 = 賁
- - ふ/女 + selector 1 = 舟
- - ふ/女 + selector 4 = 丹
- - ふ/女 + selector 5 = 妹
- - 比 + ふ/女 = 屯

==== Compounds of 女 ====
- - ふ/女 + ふ/女 + ふ/女 = 姦
- - こ/子 + ふ/女 = 好
- - ほ/方 + ふ/女 = 妄
  - - 仁/亻 + ほ/方 + ふ/女 = 侫
- - の/禾 + ふ/女 = 委
  - - く/艹 + ふ/女 = 萎
  - - な/亻 + の/禾 + ふ/女 = 倭
  - - や/疒 + の/禾 + ふ/女 = 矮
  - - ひ/辶 + の/禾 + ふ/女 = 逶
- - ひ/辶 + ふ/女 = 威
  - - い/糹/#2 + ひ/辶 + ふ/女 = 縅
  - - せ/食 + ひ/辶 + ふ/女 = 鰄
- - ん/止 + ふ/女 = 婚
- - け/犬 + ふ/女 = 嫌
- - う/宀/#3 + ふ/女 = 安
  - - と/戸 + ふ/女 = 鞍
  - - て/扌 + ふ/女 = 按
  - - ふ/女 + き/木 = 案
  - - 日 + う/宀/#3 + ふ/女 = 晏
  - - せ/食 + う/宀/#3 + ふ/女 = 鮟
- - ⺼ + ふ/女 = 腰
- - に/氵 + ふ/女 = 要
- - ふ/女 + ゑ/訁 = 奴
  - - ふ/女 + 心 = 怒
  - - れ/口 + ふ/女 + ゑ/訁 = 呶
  - - こ/子 + ふ/女 + ゑ/訁 = 孥
  - - し/巿 + ふ/女 + ゑ/訁 = 帑
  - - ゆ/彳 + ふ/女 + ゑ/訁 = 弩
  - - て/扌 + ふ/女 + ゑ/訁 = 拏
  - - そ/馬 + ふ/女 + ゑ/訁 = 駑
- - ふ/女 + か/金 = 奸
- - ふ/女 + れ/口 = 如
  - - に/氵 + ふ/女 + れ/口 = 洳
  - - い/糹/#2 + ふ/女 + れ/口 = 絮
  - - く/艹 + ふ/女 + れ/口 = 茹
  - - ふ/女 + れ/口 + れ/口 = 嬋
- - ふ/女 + に/氵 = 妊
- - ふ/女 + ね/示 = 妍
- - ふ/女 + は/辶 = 妓
- - ふ/女 + そ/馬 = 妙
- - ふ/女 + 比 = 妣
- - ふ/女 + 龸 = 妥
  - - い/糹/#2 + ふ/女 + 龸 = 綏
  - - せ/食 + ふ/女 + 龸 = 餒
- - ふ/女 + ほ/方 = 妨
- - ふ/女 + さ/阝 = 妻
  - - る/忄 + ふ/女 + さ/阝 = 悽
  - - に/氵 + ふ/女 + さ/阝 = 淒
  - - く/艹 + ふ/女 + さ/阝 = 萋
  - - ね/示 + ふ/女 + さ/阝 = 褄
- - ふ/女 + ま/石 = 妾
  - - き/木 + ふ/女 + ま/石 = 椄
  - - ち/竹 + ふ/女 + ま/石 = 霎
- - ふ/女 + し/巿 = 姉
- - ふ/女 + な/亻 = 始
- - ふ/女 + い/糹/#2 = 姓
- - ふ/女 + と/戸 = 姥
- - ふ/女 + す/発 = 姫
- - ふ/女 + け/犬 = 姻
- - ふ/女 + ん/止 = 姿
- - ふ/女 + や/疒 = 娘
- - ふ/女 + ろ/十 = 娠
- - ふ/女 + こ/子 = 娯
- - ふ/女 + ひ/辶 = 婆
- - ふ/女 + り/分 = 婦
- - ふ/女 + よ/广 = 婿
  - - ふ/女 + ふ/女 + よ/广 = 壻
- - ふ/女 + る/忄 = 媒
- - ふ/女 + め/目 = 媚
- - ふ/女 + 仁/亻 = 媛
- - ふ/女 + ら/月 = 媼
- - ふ/女 + う/宀/#3 = 嫁
- - ふ/女 + お/頁 = 嫡
- - ふ/女 + つ/土 = 嬉
- - ふ/女 + み/耳 = 嬢
  - - ふ/女 + ふ/女 + み/耳 = 孃
- - ふ/女 + を/貝 = 嬰
  - - れ/口 + ふ/女 + を/貝 = 嚶
  - - へ/⺩ + ふ/女 + を/貝 = 瓔
  - - い/糹/#2 + ふ/女 + を/貝 = 纓
- - ふ/女 + 氷/氵 = 汝
  - - ふ/女 + 氷/氵 + ほ/方 = 娑
- - 仁/亻 + 宿 + ふ/女 = 佞
- - ふ/女 + 比 + も/門 = 妁
- - ふ/女 + 宿 + け/犬 = 妖
- - や/疒 + う/宀/#3 + ふ/女 = 妛
- - へ/⺩ + 宿 + ふ/女 = 妝
- - ふ/女 + 宿 + ま/石 = 妬
- - ふ/女 + selector 4 + 日 = 妲
- - ふ/女 + 比 + は/辶 = 姆
- - ふ/女 + selector 5 + そ/馬 = 姐
- - ふ/女 + れ/口 + ろ/十 = 姑
- - ふ/女 + 仁/亻 + に/氵 = 姙
- - ふ/女 + 宿 + 宿 = 姚
- - そ/馬 + 宿 + ふ/女 = 姜
- - ふ/女 + ゆ/彳 + な/亻 = 姨
- - ふ/女 + selector 4 + ゆ/彳 = 姪
- - ふ/女 + り/分 + 囗 = 姶
- - ふ/女 + 宿 + つ/土 = 娃
- - ふ/女 + 宿 + も/門 = 娉
- - ふ/女 + う/宀/#3 + ぬ/力 = 娚
- - ふ/女 + 宿 + さ/阝 = 娜
- - ふ/女 + 宿 + ら/月 = 娟
- - ふ/女 + 囗 + selector 1 = 娥
- - ふ/女 + ぬ/力 + 宿 = 娩
- - ふ/女 + 龸 + ゑ/訁 = 娵
- - ふ/女 + み/耳 + ゑ/訁 = 娶
- - ふ/女 + り/分 + 日 = 娼
- - ふ/女 + さ/阝 + か/金 = 婀
- - ふ/女 + 宿 + う/宀/#3 = 婉
- - ふ/女 + た/⽥ + さ/阝 = 婢
- - ふ/女 + き/木 + き/木 = 婪
- - ふ/女 + 数 + に/氵 = 婬
- - ふ/女 + 宿 + そ/馬 = 媽
- - ふ/女 + 宿 + む/車 = 媾
- - ふ/女 + selector 5 + え/訁 = 嫂
- - ふ/女 + や/疒 + selector 5 = 嫉
- - ふ/女 + ゆ/彳 + ゆ/彳 = 嫋
- - ふ/女 + た/⽥ + ぬ/力 = 嫐
- - ふ/女 + に/氵 + ね/示 = 嫖
- - ふ/女 + も/門 + selector 3 = 嫗
- - ふ/女 + selector 6 + ん/止 = 嫣
- - ふ/女 + 龸 + し/巿 = 嫦
- - ふ/女 + 宿 + ん/止 = 嫩
- - ふ/女 + も/門 + ら/月 = 嫺
- - ふ/女 + も/門 + き/木 = 嫻
- - ふ/女 + 宿 + の/禾 = 嬌
- - ふ/女 + selector 6 + ま/石 = 嬖
- - ふ/女 + う/宀/#3 + を/貝 = 嬪
- - ふ/女 + ち/竹 + の/禾 = 嬬
- - た/⽥ + 宿 + ふ/女 = 嬲
- - ふ/女 + め/目 + た/⽥ = 嬶
- - ふ/女 + お/頁 + 数 = 嬾
- - ふ/女 + ち/竹 + き/木 = 孀
- - ふ/女 + 宿 + み/耳 = 孅
- - ふ/女 + 宿 + 心 = 恕
- - へ/⺩ + う/宀/#3 + ふ/女 = 珱
- - や/疒 + 宿 + ふ/女 = 痿

==== Compounds of 聿 ====
- - は/辶 + ふ/女 = 建
  - - な/亻 + ふ/女 = 健
  - - ⺼ + は/辶 + ふ/女 = 腱
- - ゆ/彳 + ふ/女 = 律
  - - 心 + ゆ/彳 + ふ/女 = 葎
- - 日 + ふ/女 = 書
- - 氷/氵 + ふ/女 = 津
- - 火 + ふ/女 = 燼
- - ち/竹 + ふ/女 = 筆
- - ふ/女 + 火 = 尽
  - - な/亻 + ふ/女 + 火 = 侭
  - - ふ/女 + ふ/女 + 火 = 盡
    - - 仁/亻 + ふ/女 + 火 = 儘
    - - つ/土 + ふ/女 + 火 = 壗
    - - を/貝 + ふ/女 + 火 = 贐
- - ふ/女 + た/⽥ = 画
  - - ふ/女 + ふ/女 + た/⽥ = 畫
    - - ぬ/力 + ふ/女 + た/⽥ = 劃
- - や/疒 + selector 3 + ふ/女 = 肄
- - と/戸 + 宿 + ふ/女 = 肆
- - ふ/女 + と/戸 + れ/口 = 肇

==== Compounds of 不 ====
- - き/木 + ふ/女 = 杯
- - ふ/女 + 囗 = 否
  - - や/疒 + ふ/女 + 囗 = 痞
- - つ/土 + selector 4 + ふ/女 = 坏
- - て/扌 + selector 4 + ふ/女 = 抔
- - す/発 + selector 4 + ふ/女 = 罘
- - ふ/女 + 数 + selector 1 = 丕
  - - ⺼ + selector 4 + ふ/女 = 胚
- - ふ/女 + ん/止 + い/糹/#2 = 歪
- - ふ/女 + selector 4 + ⺼ = 盃

==== Compounds of 賁 ====
- - れ/口 + ふ/女 = 噴
- - つ/土 + ふ/女 = 墳
- - る/忄 + ふ/女 = 憤
- - に/氵 + 宿 + ふ/女 = 濆

==== Compounds of 舟 ====
- - ふ/女 + の/禾 = 般
  - - ふ/女 + て/扌 = 搬
  - - き/木 + ふ/女 + の/禾 = 槃
  - - や/疒 + ふ/女 + の/禾 = 瘢
- - ふ/女 + 宿 = 航
- - ふ/女 + 日 = 舶
- - ふ/女 + え/訁 = 船
- - ふ/女 + へ/⺩ = 艇
- - ふ/女 + ⺼ = 艦
- - ふ/女 + selector 1 + そ/馬 = 艚
- - ふ/女 + selector 6 + こ/子 = 舩
- - ふ/女 + 宿 + ほ/方 = 舫
- - ふ/女 + 宿 + と/戸 = 舮
- - ふ/女 + た/⽥ + selector 4 = 舳
- - ふ/女 + 宿 + ひ/辶 = 舵
- - ふ/女 + 龸 + ゐ/幺 = 舷
- - ふ/女 + 比 + か/金 = 舸
- - ふ/女 + 氷/氵 + う/宀/#3 = 艀
- - ふ/女 + 宿 + え/訁 = 艘
- - ふ/女 + り/分 + お/頁 = 艙
- - ふ/女 + ち/竹 + せ/食 = 艝
- - ふ/女 + ま/石 + り/分 = 艟
- - ふ/女 + 囗 + れ/口 = 艢
- - ふ/女 + そ/馬 + 囗 = 艤
- - ふ/女 + 宿 + く/艹 = 艨
- - ふ/女 + 宿 + 日 = 艪
- - ふ/女 + 宿 + た/⽥ = 艫

==== Compounds of 丹 ====
- - ほ/方 + ふ/女 + selector 4 = 旃
- - 心 + ふ/女 + selector 4 = 栴

==== Compounds of 屯 ====
- - い/糹/#2 + ふ/女 = 純
- - か/金 + ふ/女 = 鈍
- - お/頁 + ふ/女 = 頓
  - - れ/口 + お/頁 + ふ/女 = 噸
- - に/氵 + 比 + ふ/女 = 沌
- - か/金 + 比 + ふ/女 = 瓲
- - さ/阝 + 比 + ふ/女 = 邨
- - せ/食 + 比 + ふ/女 = 飩

==== Other compounds ====
- - も/門 + ふ/女 = 匐
- - 宿 + ふ/女 = 富
  - - selector 1 + 宿 + ふ/女 = 冨
- - し/巿 + ふ/女 = 幅
- - ね/示 + ふ/女 = 福
- - む/車 + ふ/女 = 輻
- - ふ/女 + ぬ/力 = 副
- - 心 + 宿 + ふ/女 = 蔔
- - む/車 + 宿 + ふ/女 = 蝠
- - ひ/辶 + 宿 + ふ/女 = 逼
- - 仁/亻 + ふ/女 = 巫
  - - ち/竹 + 仁/亻 + ふ/女 = 筮
    - - れ/口 + 仁/亻 + ふ/女 = 噬
  - - え/訁 + 仁/亻 + ふ/女 = 誣
- - ふ/女 + 宿 + せ/食 = 鵐
- - 龸 + ふ/女 = 当
  - - き/木 + 龸 + ふ/女 = 档
  - - 龸 + 龸 + ふ/女 = 當
    - - ま/石 + 龸 + ふ/女 = 礑
    - - む/車 + 龸 + ふ/女 = 蟷
    - - ね/示 + 龸 + ふ/女 = 襠
    - - か/金 + 龸 + ふ/女 = 鐺
- - ま/石 + ふ/女 = 普
  - - え/訁 + ふ/女 = 譜
- - 心 + ふ/女 = 藤
  - - 心 + 心 + ふ/女 = 籐
- - さ/阝 + ふ/女 = 阜
  - - つ/土 + さ/阝 + ふ/女 = 埠
- - せ/食 + ふ/女 = 飾
- - ち/竹 + 宿 + ふ/女 = 籘
