= Braille pattern dots-136 =

Braille pattern

6-dot braille cells
⠀	⠁	⠃	⠉	⠙	⠑	⠋	⠛	⠓	⠊	⠚	⠈	⠘
⠄	⠅	⠇	⠍	⠝	⠕	⠏	⠟	⠗	⠎	⠞	⠌	⠜
⠤	⠥	⠧	⠭	⠽	⠵	⠯	⠿	⠷	⠮	⠾	⠬	⠼
⠠	⠡	⠣	⠩	⠹	⠱	⠫	⠻	⠳	⠪	⠺	⠨	⠸
shift down	⠂	⠆	⠒	⠲	⠢	⠖	⠶	⠦	⠔	⠴	⠐	⠰

The Braille pattern dots-136 ( ⠥ ) is a 6-dot braille cell with the top left and both bottom dots raised, or an 8-dot braille cell with the top left and both lower-middle dots raised. It is represented by the Unicode code point U+2825, and in Braille ASCII with U.

Character information
Preview	⠥ (braille pattern dots-136)	
Unicode name	BRAILLE PATTERN DOTS-136	
Encodings	decimal	hex
Unicode	10277	U+2825
UTF-8	226 160 165	E2 A0 A5
Numeric character reference	&#10277;	&#x2825;
Braille ASCII	85	55

== Unified Braille ==
In unified international braille, the braille pattern dots-136 is used to represent a close back vowel, such as /u/ or /ɯ/ or otherwise as needed.

=== Table of unified braille values ===
French Braille	U, "un"
English Braille	U
English Contraction	us
German Braille	U
Bharati Braille	उ / ਉ / ઉ / উ / ଉ / ఉ / ಉ / ഉ / உ / උ
Icelandic Braille	U
IPA Braille	/u/
Russian Braille	Ү
Slovak Braille	U
Arabic Braille	ـُ (ḍammah)
Irish Braille	U
Thai Braille	ค kh
Luxembourgish Braille	u (minuscule)

== Other braille ==
Japanese Braille	ha / は / ハ
Korean Braille	o / ㅗ
Mainland Chinese Braille	wu, -u
Taiwanese Braille	en / ㄣ
Two-Cell Chinese Braille	ku- -ěn
Gardner Salinas Braille	0
Algerian Braille	ق

== Plus dots 7 and 8 ==
Related to Braille pattern dots-136 are Braille patterns 1367, 1368, and 13678, which are used in 8-dot braille systems, such as Gardner-Salinas and Luxembourgish Braille.

Character information
Preview	⡥ (braille pattern dots-1367)		⢥ (braille pattern dots-1368)		⣥ (braille pattern dots-13678)	
Unicode name	BRAILLE PATTERN DOTS-1367		BRAILLE PATTERN DOTS-1368		BRAILLE PATTERN DOTS-13678	
Encodings	decimal	hex	dec	hex	dec	hex
Unicode	10341	U+2865	10405	U+28A5	10469	U+28E5
UTF-8	226 161 165	E2 A1 A5	226 162 165	E2 A2 A5	226 163 165	E2 A3 A5
Numeric character reference	&#10341;	&#x2865;	&#10405;	&#x28A5;	&#10469;	&#x28E5;

	dots 1367	dots 1368	dots 13678
Gardner Salinas Braille	U (capital)	υ (upsilon)	Υ (Upsilon)
Luxembourgish Braille	U (capital)		

== Related 8-dot kantenji patterns ==
In the Japanese kantenji braille, the standard 8-dot Braille patterns 278, 1278, 2478, and 12478 are the patterns related to Braille pattern dots-136, since the two additional dots of kantenji patterns 0136, 1367, and 01367 are placed above the base 6-dot cell, instead of below, as in standard 8-dot braille.

Character information
Preview	⣂ (braille pattern dots-278)		⣃ (braille pattern dots-1278)		⣊ (braille pattern dots-2478)		⣋ (braille pattern dots-12478)	
Unicode name	BRAILLE PATTERN DOTS-278		BRAILLE PATTERN DOTS-1278		BRAILLE PATTERN DOTS-2478		BRAILLE PATTERN DOTS-12478	
Encodings	decimal	hex	dec	hex	dec	hex	dec	hex
Unicode	10434	U+28C2	10435	U+28C3	10442	U+28CA	10443	U+28CB
UTF-8	226 163 130	E2 A3 82	226 163 131	E2 A3 83	226 163 138	E2 A3 8A	226 163 139	E2 A3 8B
Numeric character reference	&#10434;	&#x28C2;	&#10435;	&#x28C3;	&#10442;	&#x28CA;	&#10443;	&#x28CB;

=== Kantenji using braille patterns 278, 1278, 2478, or 12478 ===
This listing includes kantenji using Braille pattern dots-136 for all 6349 kanji found in JIS C 6226-1978.

- - 走

==== Variants and thematic compounds ====
- - selector 6 + は/辶 = 尚
- - は/辶 + selector 1 = 延
  - - は/辶 + selector 1 + selector 1 = 廴
- - は/辶 + selector 2 = 支
- - は/辶 + selector 3 = 遊
- - は/辶 + selector 4 = 赱
- - 比 + は/辶 = 母
  - - selector 1 + 比 + は/辶 = 毋

==== Compounds of 走 and 辶 ====
- - ゆ/彳 + は/辶 = 徒
- - は/辶 + と/戸 = 赴
- - は/辶 + き/木 = 起
- - は/辶 + ぬ/力 = 超
- - は/辶 + ひ/辶 = 越
- - は/辶 + ゑ/訁 = 趣
- - は/辶 + す/発 = 趨
- - は/辶 + 宿 + さ/阝 = 赳
- - は/辶 + 宿 + う/宀/#3 = 趁
- - は/辶 + そ/馬 + ⺼ = 趙
- - み/耳 + 宿 + は/辶 = 跿
- - は/辶 + か/金 = 巡
- - は/辶 + や/疒 = 辿
- - は/辶 + ろ/十 = 迅
- - は/辶 + け/犬 = 迭
- - は/辶 + に/氵 = 述
- - は/辶 + そ/馬 = 逐
- - は/辶 + つ/土 = 通
  - - き/木 + は/辶 + つ/土 = 樋
- - は/辶 + く/艹 = 造
  - - る/忄 + は/辶 + く/艹 = 慥
- - は/辶 + 宿 = 逸
- - は/辶 + む/車 = 運
- - は/辶 + ら/月 = 遣
  - - え/訁 + は/辶 + ら/月 = 譴
  - - か/金 + は/辶 + ら/月 = 鑓
- - は/辶 + さ/阝 = 遷
  - - と/戸 + は/辶 + さ/阝 = 韆
- - は/辶 + ま/石 = 邁
- - は/辶 + 宿 + か/金 = 迂

==== Compounds of 尚 ====
- - 氷/氵 + selector 6 + は/辶 = 敞
  - - よ/广 + selector 6 + は/辶 = 廠
- - に/氵 + selector 6 + は/辶 = 淌

==== Compounds of 延 and 廴 ====
- - え/訁 + は/辶 = 誕
- - か/金 + は/辶 = 鍵
  - - て/扌 + は/辶 + へ/⺩ = 挺
  - - き/木 + は/辶 + へ/⺩ = 梃
  - - ち/竹 + は/辶 + へ/⺩ = 霆
- - は/辶 + む/車 + selector 1 = 蜑
- - に/氵 + は/辶 + selector 1 = 涎
- - ち/竹 + は/辶 + selector 1 = 筵
- - く/艹 + は/辶 + selector 1 = 莚
- - む/車 + は/辶 + selector 1 = 蜒
- - は/辶 + へ/⺩ = 廷
- - は/辶 + ふ/女 = 建
  - - ⺼ + は/辶 + ふ/女 = 腱
- - は/辶 + れ/口 = 廻
- - は/辶 + た/⽥ + selector 4 = 廸
- - は/辶 + 比 + に/氵 = 廼

==== Compounds of 支 ====
- - ふ/女 + は/辶 = 妓
- - や/疒 + は/辶 = 岐
- - て/扌 + は/辶 = 技
- - き/木 + は/辶 = 枝
- - と/戸 + は/辶 = 鼓
  - - め/目 + は/辶 = 瞽
  - - と/戸 + と/戸 + は/辶 = 皷
- - ⺼ + は/辶 = 肢
- - み/耳 + は/辶 + selector 2 = 跂
- - な/亻 + 宿 + は/辶 = 伎
- - と/戸 + 宿 + は/辶 = 屐
- - は/辶 + 比 + え/訁 = 敲
- - は/辶 + む/車 + selector 2 = 翅

==== Compounds of 遊 ====
- - に/氵 + は/辶 + selector 3 = 游
- - む/車 + は/辶 + selector 3 = 蝣

==== Compounds of 母 and 毋 ====
- - 龸 + は/辶 = 毎
  - - な/亻 + は/辶 = 侮
  - - る/忄 + は/辶 = 悔
  - - 日 + は/辶 = 晦
  - - 心 + は/辶 = 梅
  - - に/氵 + は/辶 = 海
    - - つ/土 + に/氵 + は/辶 = 塰
  - - ゑ/訁 + は/辶 = 誨
  - - は/辶 + ゐ/幺 = 繁
  - - 心 + 龸 + は/辶 = 莓
- - ふ/女 + 比 + は/辶 = 姆
- - て/扌 + 比 + は/辶 = 拇
- - 心 + 比 + は/辶 = 栂
- - へ/⺩ + は/辶 = 毒
  - - ゐ/幺 + へ/⺩ + は/辶 = 纛
- - ね/示 + 比 + は/辶 = 袰
- - う/宀/#3 + う/宀/#3 + は/辶 = 實

==== Other compounds ====
- - ろ/十 + は/辶 = 半
  - - 仁/亻 + は/辶 = 伴
  - - ぬ/力 + は/辶 = 畔
  - - い/糹/#2 + は/辶 = 絆
  - - は/辶 + ね/示 = 判
  - - て/扌 + ろ/十 + は/辶 = 拌
  - - ⺼ + ろ/十 + は/辶 = 胖
  - - ね/示 + ろ/十 + は/辶 = 袢
- - ら/月 + は/辶 = 朔
  - - つ/土 + は/辶 = 塑
  - - る/忄 + ら/月 + は/辶 = 愬
  - - き/木 + ら/月 + は/辶 = 槊
  - - に/氵 + ら/月 + は/辶 = 溯
  - - ひ/辶 + ら/月 + は/辶 = 遡
- - ひ/辶 + は/辶 = 逆
- - れ/口 + は/辶 = 只
  - - た/⽥ + れ/口 + は/辶 = 咫
  - - 心 + れ/口 + は/辶 = 枳
- - う/宀/#3 + は/辶 = 実
- - け/犬 + は/辶 = 犯
- - を/貝 + は/辶 = 貼
- - は/辶 + ん/止 = 反
  - - に/氵 + は/辶 + ん/止 = 汳
  - - 日 + は/辶 + ん/止 = 皈
  - - か/金 + は/辶 + ん/止 = 鈑
- - は/辶 + い/糹/#2 = 拝
  - - は/辶 + は/辶 + い/糹/#2 = 拜
    - - に/氵 + は/辶 + い/糹/#2 = 湃
- - て/扌 + 宿 + は/辶 = 搏
- - 氷/氵 + selector 3 + は/辶 = 敝
  - - 日 + selector 3 + は/辶 = 暼
- - 心 + selector 6 + は/辶 = 棠
- - 心 + 宿 + は/辶 = 薑
- - ね/示 + selector 6 + は/辶 = 裳
