= Braille pattern dots-234 =

Braille pattern

6-dot braille cells
⠀	⠁	⠃	⠉	⠙	⠑	⠋	⠛	⠓	⠊	⠚	⠈	⠘
⠄	⠅	⠇	⠍	⠝	⠕	⠏	⠟	⠗	⠎	⠞	⠌	⠜
⠤	⠥	⠧	⠭	⠽	⠵	⠯	⠿	⠷	⠮	⠾	⠬	⠼
⠠	⠡	⠣	⠩	⠹	⠱	⠫	⠻	⠳	⠪	⠺	⠨	⠸
shift down	⠂	⠆	⠒	⠲	⠢	⠖	⠶	⠦	⠔	⠴	⠐	⠰

The Braille pattern dots-234 ( ⠎ ) is a 6-dot braille cell with the top right, and middle and bottom left dots raised, or an 8-dot braille cell with the top right and both middle left dots raised. It is represented by the Unicode code point U+280e, and in Braille ASCII with S.

Character information
Preview	⠎ (braille pattern dots-234)	
Unicode name	BRAILLE PATTERN DOTS-234	
Encodings	decimal	hex
Unicode	10254	U+280E
UTF-8	226 160 142	E2 A0 8E
Numeric character reference	&#10254;	&#x280E;
Braille ASCII	83	53

== Unified Braille ==
In unified international braille, the braille pattern dots-234 is used to represent a voiceless alveolar fricative, i.e. /s/.

=== Table of unified braille values ===
French Braille	S, "se"
English Braille	S
English Contraction	so
German Braille	S
Bharati Braille	स / ਸ / સ / স / ସ / స / ಸ / സ / ஸ / ස / س
Icelandic Braille	S
IPA Braille	/s/
Russian Braille	С
Slovak Braille	S
Arabic Braille	س
Persian Braille	س
Irish Braille	S
Thai Braille	ส s
Luxembourgish Braille	s (minuscule)

== Other braille ==
Japanese Braille	no / の / ノ
Korean Braille	eo / ㅓ
Mainland Chinese Braille	s
Taiwanese Braille	you, -iu / ㄧㄡ
Two-Cell Chinese Braille	t- -ē/-ō
Algerian Braille	غ

== Plus dots 7 and 8 ==
Related to Braille pattern dots-234 are Braille patterns 2347, 2348, and 23478, which are used in 8-dot braille systems, such as Gardner-Salinas and Luxembourgish Braille.

Character information
Preview	⡎ (braille pattern dots-2347)		⢎ (braille pattern dots-2348)		⣎ (braille pattern dots-23478)	
Unicode name	BRAILLE PATTERN DOTS-2347		BRAILLE PATTERN DOTS-2348		BRAILLE PATTERN DOTS-23478	
Encodings	decimal	hex	dec	hex	dec	hex
Unicode	10318	U+284E	10382	U+288E	10446	U+28CE
UTF-8	226 161 142	E2 A1 8E	226 162 142	E2 A2 8E	226 163 142	E2 A3 8E
Numeric character reference	&#10318;	&#x284E;	&#10382;	&#x288E;	&#10446;	&#x28CE;

	dots 2347	dots 2348	dots 23478
Gardner Salinas Braille	S (capital)	σ (sigma)	Σ (Sigma)
Luxembourgish Braille	S (capital)		

== Related 8-dot kantenji patterns ==
In the Japanese kantenji braille, the standard 8-dot Braille patterns 357, 1357, 3457, and 13457 are the patterns related to Braille pattern dots-234, since the two additional dots of kantenji patterns 0234, 2347, and 02347 are placed above the base 6-dot cell, instead of below, as in standard 8-dot braille.

Character information
Preview	⡔ (braille pattern dots-357)		⡕ (braille pattern dots-1357)		⡜ (braille pattern dots-3457)		⡝ (braille pattern dots-13457)	
Unicode name	BRAILLE PATTERN DOTS-357		BRAILLE PATTERN DOTS-1357		BRAILLE PATTERN DOTS-3457		BRAILLE PATTERN DOTS-13457	
Encodings	decimal	hex	dec	hex	dec	hex	dec	hex
Unicode	10324	U+2854	10325	U+2855	10332	U+285C	10333	U+285D
UTF-8	226 161 148	E2 A1 94	226 161 149	E2 A1 95	226 161 156	E2 A1 9C	226 161 157	E2 A1 9D
Numeric character reference	&#10324;	&#x2854;	&#10325;	&#x2855;	&#10332;	&#x285C;	&#10333;	&#x285D;

=== Kantenji using braille patterns 357, 1357, 3457, or 13457 ===
This listing includes kantenji using Braille pattern dots-234 for all 6349 kanji found in JIS C 6226-1978.

- - 私

==== Variants and thematic compounds ====
- - の/禾 + selector 1 = 米
- - の/禾 + selector 3 = 禾
- - の/禾 + selector 4 = 稲
- - の/禾 + selector 5 = 秘
- - selector 1 + の/禾 = 喬
- - selector 2 + の/禾 = 乏
- - selector 4 + の/禾 = 段
  - - selector 4 + selector 4 + の/禾 = 殳
- - selector 5 + の/禾 = 之
- - selector 6 + の/禾 = 而

==== Compounds of 私 ====
- - 宿 + の/禾 = 稼
- - の/禾 + ぬ/力 = 利
  - - な/亻 + の/禾 + ぬ/力 = 俐
  - - る/忄 + の/禾 + ぬ/力 = 悧
  - - 心 + の/禾 + ぬ/力 = 梨
  - - そ/馬 + の/禾 + ぬ/力 = 犁
  - - む/車 + の/禾 + ぬ/力 = 蜊
  - - せ/食 + の/禾 + ぬ/力 = 鯏
- - の/禾 + れ/口 = 和
  - - れ/口 + の/禾 + れ/口 = 啝
- - の/禾 + 火 = 秋
  - - の/禾 + 心 = 愁
  - - れ/口 + の/禾 + 火 = 啾
  - - る/忄 + の/禾 + 火 = 愀
  - - 心 + の/禾 + 火 = 楸
  - - に/氵 + の/禾 + 火 = 湫
  - - か/金 + の/禾 + 火 = 鍬
  - - と/戸 + の/禾 + 火 = 鞦
  - - せ/食 + の/禾 + 火 = 鰍
- - の/禾 + と/戸 = 科
  - - 心 + の/禾 + と/戸 = 萪
  - - む/車 + の/禾 + と/戸 = 蝌
- - の/禾 + そ/馬 = 租
- - の/禾 + け/犬 = 秩
- - の/禾 + 龸 = 称
- - の/禾 + ほ/方 = 移
- - の/禾 + へ/⺩ = 程
- - の/禾 + 宿 = 税
- - の/禾 + い/糹/#2 = 稚
- - の/禾 + す/発 = 稜
  - - 心 + の/禾 + す/発 = 薐
- - の/禾 + り/分 = 種
- - の/禾 + 仁/亻 = 稽
- - の/禾 + え/訁 = 稿
- - の/禾 + む/車 = 穂
  - - の/禾 + の/禾 + む/車 = 穗
- - の/禾 + を/貝 = 積
  - - や/疒 + の/禾 + を/貝 = 癪
- - の/禾 + る/忄 = 穏
  - - の/禾 + の/禾 + る/忄 = 穩
- - の/禾 + ん/止 = 穢
- - の/禾 + み/耳 = 穣
  - - の/禾 + の/禾 + み/耳 = 穰
- - の/禾 + く/艹 = 穫
- - の/禾 + 数 = 黎
- - そ/馬 + の/禾 + selector 1 = 犂
- - の/禾 + selector 6 + か/金 = 甃
- - の/禾 + の/禾 + 龸 = 稱
- - の/禾 + 宿 + 比 = 秕
- - の/禾 + ろ/十 + ゑ/訁 = 秡
- - の/禾 + き/木 + selector 5 = 秣
- - の/禾 + り/分 + か/金 = 秤
- - の/禾 + け/犬 + お/頁 = 秧
- - の/禾 + selector 1 + す/発 = 秬
- - の/禾 + め/目 + し/巿 = 稀
- - の/禾 + selector 4 + か/金 = 稈
- - の/禾 + そ/馬 + ⺼ = 稍
- - の/禾 + り/分 + 心 = 稔
- - の/禾 + selector 4 + き/木 = 稘
- - の/禾 + ろ/十 + め/目 = 稙
- - の/禾 + 囗 + つ/土 = 稠
- - の/禾 + う/宀/#3 + た/⽥ = 穃
- - の/禾 + ほ/方 + そ/馬 = 穆
- - の/禾 + 宿 + と/戸 = 穉
- - の/禾 + 比 + め/目 = 穐
- - の/禾 + 宿 + 囗 = 穡
- - の/禾 + 宿 + め/目 = 龝

==== Compounds of 米 ====
- - 囗 + の/禾 = 奥
  - - つ/土 + 囗 + の/禾 = 墺
  - - 囗 + 囗 + の/禾 = 奧
  - - に/氵 + 囗 + の/禾 = 澳
  - - 火 + 囗 + の/禾 = 燠
  - - ま/石 + 囗 + の/禾 = 礇
  - - も/門 + 囗 + の/禾 = 粤
  - - ね/示 + 囗 + の/禾 = 襖
- - る/忄 + の/禾 = 憐
- - と/戸 + の/禾 = 料
- - を/貝 + の/禾 = 断
  - - を/貝 + を/貝 + の/禾 = 斷
- - ん/止 + の/禾 = 歯
  - - れ/口 + ん/止 + の/禾 = 噛
  - - ん/止 + ん/止 + の/禾 = 齒
  - - ひ/辶 + ん/止 + の/禾 = 齔
  - - そ/馬 + ん/止 + の/禾 = 齟
  - - 囗 + ん/止 + の/禾 = 齠
  - - や/疒 + ん/止 + の/禾 = 齦
  - - ぬ/力 + ん/止 + の/禾 = 齧
    - - せ/食 + ん/止 + の/禾 = 囓
  - - み/耳 + ん/止 + の/禾 = 齲
  - - け/犬 + ん/止 + の/禾 = 齶
- - 火 + の/禾 = 燐
- - り/分 + の/禾 = 粉
  - - と/戸 + り/分 + の/禾 = 彜
- - そ/馬 + の/禾 = 粗
- - い/糹/#2 + の/禾 = 継
  - - い/糹/#2 + い/糹/#2 + の/禾 = 繼
- - ひ/辶 + の/禾 = 迷
  - - え/訁 + ひ/辶 + の/禾 = 謎
- - さ/阝 + の/禾 = 隣
  - - さ/阝 + さ/阝 + の/禾 = 鄰
- - お/頁 + の/禾 = 類
- - せ/食 + の/禾 = 鱗
- - の/禾 + た/⽥ = 番
  - - う/宀/#3 + の/禾 = 審
  - - し/巿 + の/禾 + た/⽥ = 幡
  - - て/扌 + の/禾 + た/⽥ = 播
  - - ほ/方 + の/禾 + た/⽥ = 旛
  - - に/氵 + の/禾 + た/⽥ = 潘
  - - 火 + の/禾 + た/⽥ = 燔
  - - い/糹/#2 + の/禾 + た/⽥ = 繙
  - - ⺼ + の/禾 + た/⽥ = 膰
  - - く/艹 + の/禾 + た/⽥ = 蕃
  - - む/車 + の/禾 + た/⽥ = 蟠
  - - か/金 + の/禾 + た/⽥ = 鐇
- - の/禾 + お/頁 = 粁
- - の/禾 + ろ/十 = 粋
- - の/禾 + に/氵 = 粍
- - の/禾 + ま/石 = 粒
- - の/禾 + 囗 = 粘
- - の/禾 + つ/土 = 粧
- - の/禾 + せ/食 = 精
- - の/禾 + う/宀/#3 = 糎
- - の/禾 + も/門 = 糖
- - の/禾 + か/金 = 糧
- - た/⽥ + の/禾 = 釈
- - と/戸 + の/禾 + selector 1 = 屎
- - す/発 + の/禾 + selector 1 = 粂
- - の/禾 + selector 1 + ぬ/力 = 籾
- - の/禾 + selector 1 + き/木 = 糂
- - の/禾 + selector 1 + そ/馬 = 糟
- - の/禾 + 宿 + ろ/十 = 籵
- - の/禾 + う/宀/#3 + 比 = 粃
- - の/禾 + 龸 + と/戸 = 粐
- - の/禾 + 日 + selector 1 = 粕
- - の/禾 + 囗 + と/戸 = 粡
- - の/禾 + 氷/氵 + ん/止 = 粢
- - の/禾 + の/禾 + ろ/十 = 粹
- - と/戸 + 龸 + の/禾 = 彝
- - に/氵 + う/宀/#3 + の/禾 = 瀋
- - の/禾 + 数 + め/目 = 粨
- - の/禾 + り/分 + 囗 = 粭
- - の/禾 + 比 + や/疒 = 粮
- - の/禾 + 宿 + に/氵 = 粱
- - の/禾 + 宿 + さ/阝 = 粲
- - の/禾 + 日 + な/亻 = 粳
- - の/禾 + う/宀/#3 + ね/示 = 粽
- - の/禾 + く/艹 + 比 = 糀
- - の/禾 + き/木 + よ/广 = 糅
- - の/禾 + 宿 + ら/月 = 糊
- - の/禾 + 宿 + ひ/辶 = 糒
- - の/禾 + 宿 + う/宀/#3 = 糘
- - の/禾 + 心 + ま/石 = 糜
- - の/禾 + た/⽥ + こ/子 = 糞
- - の/禾 + よ/广 + ゆ/彳 = 糠
- - の/禾 + selector 6 + く/艹 = 糢
- - の/禾 + 数 + ま/石 = 糲
- - の/禾 + 比 + な/亻 = 糴
- - の/禾 + 比 + へ/⺩ = 糶
- - か/金 + 宿 + の/禾 = 鑿
- - の/禾 + そ/馬 + 比 = 麋
- - の/禾 + 宿 + そ/馬 = 麟
- - の/禾 + た/⽥ + selector 4 = 釉
- - た/⽥ + た/⽥ + の/禾 = 釋
- - の/禾 + 宿 + せ/食 = 鷭
- - ゆ/彳 + 宿 + の/禾 = 粥

==== Compounds of 禾 ====
- - け/犬 + の/禾 = 秦
  - - 心 + け/犬 + の/禾 = 榛
  - - ゆ/彳 + け/犬 + の/禾 = 臻
  - - く/艹 + け/犬 + の/禾 = 蓁
- - の/禾 + ふ/女 = 委
  - - な/亻 + の/禾 + ふ/女 = 倭
  - - や/疒 + の/禾 + ふ/女 = 矮
  - - ひ/辶 + の/禾 + ふ/女 = 逶
- - の/禾 + こ/子 = 季
  - - る/忄 + の/禾 + こ/子 = 悸
- - の/禾 + ゐ/幺 = 秀
  - - い/糹/#2 + の/禾 + ゐ/幺 = 綉
  - - 心 + の/禾 + ゐ/幺 = 莠
  - - か/金 + の/禾 + ゐ/幺 = 銹
- - の/禾 + 日 = 香
  - - す/発 + の/禾 + 日 = 馥
  - - み/耳 + の/禾 + 日 = 馨
- - の/禾 + き/木 = 乗
  - - selector 1 + の/禾 + き/木 = 乖
    - - の/禾 + の/禾 + き/木 = 乘
  - - の/禾 + ね/示 = 剰
    - - の/禾 + の/禾 + ね/示 = 剩
- - そ/馬 + の/禾 + ゐ/幺 = 羲
- - ふ/女 + 宿 + の/禾 = 嬌
- - や/疒 + 宿 + の/禾 = 矯
- - 心 + 宿 + の/禾 = 蕎
- - む/車 + う/宀/#3 + の/禾 = 轎
- - そ/馬 + 宿 + の/禾 = 驕
- - ほ/方 + 宿 + の/禾 = 旙
- - の/禾 + 宿 + 龸 = 禿
- - の/禾 + 囗 + れ/口 = 稟
- - の/禾 + 比 + え/訁 = 稾
- - の/禾 + 宿 + お/頁 = 穎
- - 心 + う/宀/#3 + の/禾 = 藜
- - の/禾 + お/頁 + に/氵 = 魏
- - の/禾 + れ/口 + と/戸 = 黏
- - の/禾 + selector 4 + い/糹/#2 = 黐
- - せ/食 + 龸 + の/禾 = 酥

==== Compounds of 稲 ====
- - の/禾 + の/禾 + selector 4 = 稻

==== Compounds of 秘 ====
- - の/禾 + の/禾 + selector 5 = 祕

==== Compounds of 喬 ====
- - 仁/亻 + の/禾 = 僑
- - き/木 + の/禾 = 橋

==== Compounds of 乏 ====
- - に/氵 + selector 2 + の/禾 = 泛
- - を/貝 + selector 2 + の/禾 = 貶

==== Compounds of 段 and 殳 ====
- - 日 + の/禾 = 暇
- - か/金 + の/禾 = 鍛
- - き/木 + selector 4 + の/禾 = 椴
- - い/糹/#2 + selector 4 + の/禾 = 緞
- - 心 + selector 4 + の/禾 = 葮
- - ゆ/彳 + の/禾 = 役
- - て/扌 + の/禾 = 投
- - む/車 + の/禾 = 撃
- - も/門 + の/禾 = 殴
  - - も/門 + も/門 + の/禾 = 毆
- - め/目 + の/禾 = 殺
- - こ/子 + の/禾 = 殿
  - - に/氵 + こ/子 + の/禾 = 澱
  - - や/疒 + こ/子 + の/禾 = 癜
- - ぬ/力 + の/禾 = 毀
  - - 火 + ぬ/力 + の/禾 = 燬
- - に/氵 + の/禾 = 没
  - - に/氵 + に/氵 + の/禾 = 沒
- - や/疒 + の/禾 = 疫
- - つ/土 + の/禾 = 穀
- - ⺼ + の/禾 = 股
- - ふ/女 + の/禾 = 般
  - - の/禾 + ⺼ = 盤
  - - き/木 + ふ/女 + の/禾 = 槃
  - - や/疒 + ふ/女 + の/禾 = 瘢
- - え/訁 + の/禾 = 設
- - へ/⺩ + 宿 + の/禾 = 瑕
- - 心 + 龸 + の/禾 = 葭
- - む/車 + 宿 + の/禾 = 蝦
- - ひ/辶 + 宿 + の/禾 = 遐
- - か/金 + 龸 + の/禾 = 鍜
- - ち/竹 + 宿 + の/禾 = 霞
- - せ/食 + う/宀/#3 + の/禾 = 鰕
- - よ/广 + 宿 + の/禾 = 廏
- - み/耳 + 宿 + の/禾 = 殷
- - ま/石 + 宿 + の/禾 = 磐
- - く/艹 + 龸 + の/禾 = 芟
- - む/車 + 龸 + の/禾 = 轂
- - せ/食 + 宿 + の/禾 = 酘
- - の/禾 + か/金 + ら/月 = 骰

==== Compounds of 之 ====
- - 心 + の/禾 = 芝

==== Compounds of 而 ====
- - ち/竹 + の/禾 = 需
  - - な/亻 + の/禾 = 儒
  - - 氷/氵 + の/禾 = 濡
  - - ふ/女 + ち/竹 + の/禾 = 嬬
  - - こ/子 + ち/竹 + の/禾 = 孺
  - - る/忄 + ち/竹 + の/禾 = 懦
  - - の/禾 + ち/竹 + の/禾 = 糯
  - - い/糹/#2 + ち/竹 + の/禾 = 繻
  - - む/車 + ち/竹 + の/禾 = 蠕
  - - ね/示 + ち/竹 + の/禾 = 襦
- - へ/⺩ + の/禾 = 瑞
- - ま/石 + の/禾 = 端
- - の/禾 + し/巿 = 耐
- - の/禾 + selector 6 + の/禾 = 粫
- - れ/口 + 宿 + の/禾 = 喘
- - る/忄 + 宿 + の/禾 = 惴
- - て/扌 + 宿 + の/禾 = 揣
- - に/氵 + 宿 + の/禾 = 湍
- - け/犬 + 宿 + の/禾 = 猯

==== Other compounds ====
- - 数 + の/禾 = 庚
- - れ/口 + の/禾 = 唆
- - み/耳 + の/禾 = 声
  - - ま/石 + み/耳 + の/禾 = 磬
  - - み/耳 + み/耳 + の/禾 = 聲
  - - え/訁 + み/耳 + の/禾 = 謦
- - ら/月 + の/禾 = 能
- - 囗 + め/目 + の/禾 = 弑
- - ほ/方 + に/氵 + の/禾 = 歿
- - て/扌 + の/禾 + selector 4 = 秉
