= Thai and Lao Braille =

Braille alphabets of the Thai and Lao languages

Thai Braille (อักษรเบรลล์) and Lao Braille (ອັກສອນເບຣລລ໌) are the braille alphabets of the Thai language and Lao language. Thai Braille was adapted by Genevieve Caulfield, who knew both English and Japanese Braille. Unlike the print Thai alphabet, which is an abugida, Thai and Lao Braille have full letters rather than diacritics for vowels. However, traces of the abugida remain: Only the consonants are based on the international English and French standard, while the vowels are reassigned and the five vowels transcribed a e i o u are taken from Japanese Braille.

== Braille charts ==
Thai and Lao Braille run as follows:

=== Consonants ===
Consonants follow English and international conventions except where, as in b and f, there is interference from the Japanese-derived vowels. Low-tone-class kh, ng, ch, s, th, f are derived from English Braille k, g, st, s, th, f by adding dot 6. B and low ph are derived from high ph through reflection; p is a superposition of b and ph; the three consonants had been transcribed b, bp, p in Caulfield's day.

Thai	ก k	ข kh	ฃ *kh	ค kh	ฅ *kh	ฆ kh	ง ng
Lao	ກ k	ຂ kh		ຄ kh			ງ ng
Braille	⠛ (braille pattern dots-1245)	⠅ (braille pattern dots-13)	⠴ (braille pattern dots-356) ⠅ (braille pattern dots-13)	⠥ (braille pattern dots-136)	⠤ (braille pattern dots-36) ⠥ (braille pattern dots-136)	⠠ (braille pattern dots-6) ⠥ (braille pattern dots-136)	⠻ (braille pattern dots-12456)
	จ c	ฉ ch		ช ch	ซ s	ฌ ch	ญ y
	ຈ ch				ຊ s		ຢ y
	⠚ (braille pattern dots-245)	⠌ (braille pattern dots-34)		⠬ (braille pattern dots-346)	⠮ (braille pattern dots-2346)	⠠ (braille pattern dots-6) ⠬ (braille pattern dots-346)	⠠ (braille pattern dots-6) ⠽ (braille pattern dots-13456)
ฎ d	ฏ t	ฐ th		ฑ th		ฒ th	ณ n
⠠ (braille pattern dots-6) ⠙ (braille pattern dots-145)	⠠ (braille pattern dots-6) ⠳ (braille pattern dots-1256)	⠠ (braille pattern dots-6) ⠞ (braille pattern dots-2345)		⠠ (braille pattern dots-6) ⠾ (braille pattern dots-23456)		⠤ (braille pattern dots-36) ⠾ (braille pattern dots-23456)	⠠ (braille pattern dots-6) ⠝ (braille pattern dots-1345)
ด d	ต t	ถ th		ท th		ธ th	น n
ດ d	ຕ t	ຖ th		ທ th			ນ n
⠙ (braille pattern dots-145)	⠳ (braille pattern dots-1256)	⠞ (braille pattern dots-2345)		⠾ (braille pattern dots-23456)		⠴ (braille pattern dots-356) ⠾ (braille pattern dots-23456)	⠝ (braille pattern dots-1345)
บ b	ป p	ผ ph	ฝ f	พ ph	ฟ f	ภ ph	ม m
ບ b	ປ p	ຜ ph	ຝ f	ພ ph	ຟ f		ມ m
⠧ (braille pattern dots-1236)	⠯ (braille pattern dots-12346)	⠏ (braille pattern dots-1234)	⠭ (braille pattern dots-1346)	⠹ (braille pattern dots-1456)	⠫ (braille pattern dots-1246)	⠠ (braille pattern dots-6) ⠹ (braille pattern dots-1456)	⠍ (braille pattern dots-134)
ย y	ร r	ล l	ว w	ศ s	ษ s	ส s	ห h
ຍ ⁿy	ຣ r	ລ l	ວ w			ສ s	ຫ h
⠽ (braille pattern dots-13456)	⠗ (braille pattern dots-1235)	⠇ (braille pattern dots-123)	⠺ (braille pattern dots-2456)	⠠ (braille pattern dots-6) ⠎ (braille pattern dots-234)	⠤ (braille pattern dots-36) ⠎ (braille pattern dots-234)	⠎ (braille pattern dots-234)	⠓ (braille pattern dots-125)
ฬ l	อ '	ฮ h					
	ອ '	ຮ h					
⠠ (braille pattern dots-6) ⠇ (braille pattern dots-123)	⠕ (braille pattern dots-135)	⠿ (braille pattern dots-123456)					

Letters with asterisks are obsolete. Dark cells are high-class letters in Thai, grey cells are mid-class, and light cells are low-class. Consonants of different tone classes have distinct braille letters; complete homonyms, found in Thai only, are distinguished by prefixes. The one prefix in Lao is found in /jaː/ (ຢ ⠠⠽ y), which corresponds to Thai ying (ญ ⠠⠽ y) in Braille but corresponds to Thai yak (ย ⠽ y) in alphabetic (non-Braille) position. Lao /ɲúŋ/ (ຍ ⠽ ny) corresponds to Thai yak (ย ⠽ y) in Braille and looks but corresponds to Thai ying (ญ ⠠⠽ y) in alphabetic position.

In Thai, ⠓ h is prefixed to low-class nasal stops and non-plosives ⠻⠀⠠⠽⠀⠝⠀⠍⠀⠽⠀⠗⠀⠇⠀⠺ ng y n m y r l w to move them to the high-class. Lao has the same system for similar characters ⠻⠀⠽⠀⠝⠀⠍⠀⠇⠀⠺ ng ny n m l w.

=== Vowels ===
The short vowels /a, e, i, o, u/ are taken from Japanese Braille, and the long vowels /aː, eː, iː, oː, uː/ are derived from these. ⠕ /ɔː/ is French and international o, and ⠪ /ɯ/ is French œ. The other vowels have little recognizable connection to other braille alphabets.

Vowels which have different forms in print depending on the environment retain their forms in braille. Many vowel forms which consist of multiple characters in print have their own braille letter.

IPA	/a/		/i/	/ɯ/	/u/		/e/	/ɛ/	/o/		/ɔ/	/ɤ/	/iaʔ/	/ɯaʔ/	/uaʔ/
Thai	◌ะ	◌ั	◌ิ	◌ึ	◌ุ		เ◌ะ	แ◌ะ	โ◌ะ		เ◌าะ	เ◌อะ	เ◌ียะ	เ◌ือะ	◌ัวะ
Lao	◌ະ	◌ັ◌	◌ິ	◌ຶ		◌ຸ	ເ◌ະ	ແ◌ະ	ໂ◌ະ	◌ົ◌	ເ◌າະ	ເ◌ິ	ເ◌ັຍ	ເ◌ຶອ	◌ົວະ
Braille	⠁ (braille pattern dots-1)	⠜ (braille pattern dots-345)	⠃ (braille pattern dots-12)	⠪ (braille pattern dots-246)	⠉ (braille pattern dots-14)	⠤ (braille pattern dots-36)	⠋ (braille pattern dots-124) ⠁ (braille pattern dots-1)	⠣ (braille pattern dots-126) ⠁ (braille pattern dots-1)	⠊ (braille pattern dots-24) ⠁ (braille pattern dots-1)	⠉ (braille pattern dots-14)	⠕ (braille pattern dots-135) ⠁ (braille pattern dots-1)	⠩ (braille pattern dots-146) ⠁ (braille pattern dots-1)	⠷ (braille pattern dots-12356) ⠁ (braille pattern dots-1)	⠟ (braille pattern dots-12345) ⠁ (braille pattern dots-1)	⠑ (braille pattern dots-15) ⠁ (braille pattern dots-1)

IPA	/aː/	/iː/	/ɯː/	/uː/	/eː/	/ɛː/	/oː/	/ɔː/		/ɤː/		/ia/		/ɯa/	/ua/	
Thai	◌า	◌ี	◌ื	◌ู	เ◌	แ◌	โ◌	◌อ		เ◌อ*	เ◌ิ◌	เ◌ีย		เ◌ือ	◌ัว	◌ว◌
Lao	◌າ	◌ີ	◌ື	◌ູ	ເ◌	ແ◌	ໂ◌	◌ໍ	◌ອ◌	ເ◌ີ		ເ◌ຍ	◌ຽ◌	ເ◌ືອ	◌ົວ	◌ວ◌
Braille	⠡ (braille pattern dots-16)	⠆ (braille pattern dots-23)	⠢ (braille pattern dots-26)	⠒ (braille pattern dots-25)	⠋ (braille pattern dots-124)	⠣ (braille pattern dots-126)	⠊ (braille pattern dots-24)	⠕ (braille pattern dots-135)		*		⠷ (braille pattern dots-12356)	⠸ (braille pattern dots-456)	⠟ (braille pattern dots-12345)	⠑ (braille pattern dots-15)	⠺ (braille pattern dots-2456)

IPA	/am/	/aj/	/aj/	/aw/	/rɯ/	/rɯː/	/lɯ/	/lɯː/
Thai	◌ำ	ไ◌	ใ◌	เ◌า	ฤ	ฤๅ	ฦ	ฦๅ
Lao	◌ໍາ	ໄ◌	ໃ◌	ເ◌ົາ				
Braille	⠵ (braille pattern dots-1356)	⠱ (braille pattern dots-156)	⠱ (braille pattern dots-156) ⠂ (braille pattern dots-2)	⠖ (braille pattern dots-235)	⠗ (braille pattern dots-1235) ⠂ (braille pattern dots-2)	⠗ (braille pattern dots-1235) ⠂ (braille pattern dots-2) ⠡ (braille pattern dots-16)	⠇ (braille pattern dots-123) ⠂ (braille pattern dots-2)	⠇ (braille pattern dots-123) ⠂ (braille pattern dots-2) ⠡ (braille pattern dots-16)

*When เ◌อ /ɤː/ is used with final consonants in certain words (e.g. เทอม, เทอญ), the braille letter is not used, instead each character is spelled out (⠋◌⠕).

=== Tone letters ===
่ ◌່ ¹	้ ◌້ ²	๊ ◌໊ ³	๋ ◌໋ ⁴
⠔ (braille pattern dots-35)	⠲ (braille pattern dots-256)	⠶ (braille pattern dots-2356)	⠦ (braille pattern dots-236)

=== Other symbols ===
์	ๆ	็ ฺ	ฯ	ฯลฯ	◌̊
	ໆ				
silent characters	reduplication	denotes short vowel	abbreviation	etc.	anusvara
⠴ (braille pattern dots-356)	⠂ (braille pattern dots-2)	⠄ (braille pattern dots-3)	⠰ (braille pattern dots-56) ⠆ (braille pattern dots-23)	⠰ (braille pattern dots-56) ⠇ (braille pattern dots-123)	⠐ (braille pattern dots-5)

The short sign (⠄ ็) is also used for the rarer virama (⠄ ฺ).

The anusvara (⠄◌̊) is placed before the consonant it modifies.

=== Form and Order ===
Braille mostly follows print orthography with the following exceptions:

- Vowel forms which consist of multiple characters and have their own braille letters are written after the initial consonant(s) but before any tone markers.
- Vowel forms ⠁ ◌ะ/◌ະ /a/ and ⠵ ◌ ำ/◌ໍາ /am/ (notably not ⠡ ◌า/◌າ /aː/) are written before any tone markers (whereas in print, they are written after).

Consequently, ⠋ เ◌/ເ◌ /eː/, ⠣ แ◌/ແ◌ /ɛː/, ⠊ โ◌/ໂ◌ /oː/, ⠱ ไ◌/ໄ◌ /aj/, ⠱⠂ ใ◌/ໃ◌ /aj/ retain their position at the beginning of a syllable. This does not apply to เ◌ะ/ເ◌ະ /e/, แ◌ะ/ແ◌ະ /ɛ/, โ◌ะ/ໂ◌ະ /o/ since these forms have their own braille letters. The characters อ/ອ (/ʔ/ or /ɔ/) and ว/ວ (/w/ or /ua/) are written identically whether they function as consonants or vowels. Additionally, Thai เ◌็◌ แ◌็◌ ◌็อ◌ ◌ือ and Lao ເ◌ັ◌ ແ◌ັ◌ ◌ັອ◌ do not have their own braille letter and thus, are written out character by character in their print sequence.

== Numbers ==
Numbers are the same as in other braille alphabets, though dot six ⠠ is prefixed to the ⠼ to specify that they're Thai or Lao digits. Thus, a sequence of numbers begins with ⠠⠼.

prefix denoting numbers

	1	2	3	4	5	6	7	8	9	0
Thai Numerals	๑	๒	๓	๔	๕	๖	๗	๘	๙	๐
Lao Numerals	໑	໒	໓	໔	໕	໖	໗	໘	໙	໐
Braille	⠁ (braille pattern dots-1)	⠃ (braille pattern dots-12)	⠉ (braille pattern dots-14)	⠙ (braille pattern dots-145)	⠑ (braille pattern dots-15)	⠋ (braille pattern dots-124)	⠛ (braille pattern dots-1245)	⠓ (braille pattern dots-125)	⠊ (braille pattern dots-24)	⠚ (braille pattern dots-245)

== Punctuation ==
Single (though not paired) clause-final punctuation may introduced with ⠸, but is otherwise as in English Braille.

.	?	!	;	:	/
⠸ (braille pattern dots-456) ⠲ (braille pattern dots-256)	⠸ (braille pattern dots-456) ⠦ (braille pattern dots-236)	⠸ (braille pattern dots-456) ⠖ (braille pattern dots-235)	⠸ (braille pattern dots-456) ⠆ (braille pattern dots-23)	⠸ (braille pattern dots-456) ⠒ (braille pattern dots-25)	⠸ (braille pattern dots-456) ⠌ (braille pattern dots-34)

There is some variability in the use of the ⠸ to mark stop/period, comma, and the exclamation point. Thai Braille seems to use ⠄ for the comma, while Lao Braille uses ⠸⠂, unless the latter is a copy error in Unesco (2013).

–	=	″	%
⠤ (braille pattern dots-36)	⠰ (braille pattern dots-56) ⠶ (braille pattern dots-2356)	⠐ (braille pattern dots-5) ⠂ (braille pattern dots-2)	⠈ (braille pattern dots-4) ⠴ (braille pattern dots-356)

“ ... ”	( ... )	........	-----
...	...	⠄ (braille pattern dots-3)	⠨ (braille pattern dots-46) ⠄ (braille pattern dots-3)

== Example ==
Braille	⠺⠃	⠛⠃	⠹⠆	⠙⠷
Thai	วิ	กิ	พี	เดีย
Lao	ວິ	ກິ	ພີ	ເດຍ
