= Two-cell Chinese Braille =

Braille system for Standard Chinese

- Script type: Semisyllabary with characteristics of an abugida
- Languages: Standard Mandarin

Related scripts
- Parent systems: Braille: Japanese Braille; Two-cell Chinese Braille

Two-cell Chinese Braille
- Traditional Chinese: 漢語雙拼盲文
- Simplified Chinese: 汉语双拼盲文
Transcriptions
Standard Mandarin
- Hanyu Pinyin: Hànyǔ shuāngpīn mángwén

Two-cell Chinese Braille was designed in the 1970s and is used in parallel with traditional Chinese Braille in China.

Each syllable is rendered with two braille characters. The first combines the initial and medial; the second the rime and tone. The base letters represent the initial and rime; these are modified with diacritics for the medial and tone. Thus each of the braille cells has aspects of an abugida.

== Braille charts ==
=== Onsets ===
The first cell indicates the initial, generally in dots 1 to 4, and the medial in dots 5 and 6. This design exploits restrictions on co-occurrence of initials and medials to fit all the allowable combinations in a single cell.

The medial -i- is represented by dot 5 (⠐), the medial -u- by dot 6 (⠠), and the medial -ü- by both dots 5 and 6 (⠰). The z c s series is derived from zh ch sh as if they contained a -i- medial; these two series are not distinguished in many Mandarin dialects. As in traditional Chinese Braille, k g h and q j x are unified, as they never contrast.

A null/zero initial (a vowel-initial syllable) is indicated with the null consonant ⠾.

–	b-	p-	m-	f-	d-	t-	n-	l-	g-	k-	h-	zh-	ch-	sh-	r-
y-	bi-	pi-	mi-		di-	ti-	ni-	li-	ji-	qi-	xi-	z-	c-	s-	
w-					du-	tu-	nu-	lu-	gu-	ku-	hu-	zhu-	chu-	shu-	ru-
yu-							nü-	lü-	ju-	qu-	xu-	zu-	cu-	su-	

At least one letter in each place of articulation comes from international use (⠖ f, ⠞ ti, ⠇ l, ⠅ k, ⠓ xi, ⠉ zh), with at least some of the others derived from these (cf. ⠅⠃⠁ k h g and ⠍⠋⠉ ch sh zh).

=== Rimes ===
The second cell represents the rime, generally in the top half of the cell, and the tone, generally in dots 3 and 6.

Tone 1 (mā) is indicated by dot 3 (⠄), tone 2 (má) by dot 6 (⠠), and tone 3 (mǎ) by dots 3 and 6 (⠤). (In rime -ei, which already contains a dot 3, the dot 3 for tones 1 and 3 is replaced by dot 5 (⠐ or ⠰).) Tone 4 (mà) and neutral/toneless syllables use the basic rime.

A null/zero rime (a syllable ending with medial i u ü) is written with ⠃.

-ì, -ù, -ǜ	-à	-è, -ò	-ài	-èi	-ào	-òu	-àn	-èn	-àng	-èng	èr
-ī, -ū, -ǖ	-ā	-ē, -ō	-āi	-ēi	-āo	-ōu	-ān	-ēn	-āng	-ēng	ēr
-í, -ú, -ǘ	-á	-é, -ó	-ái	-éi	-áo	-óu	-án	-én	-áng	-éng	ér
-ǐ, -ǔ, -ǚ	-ǎ	-ě, -ǒ	-ǎi	-ěi	-ǎo	-ǒu	-ǎn	-ěn	-ǎng	-ěng	ěr

- ⠃ is the 'zero' rime transcribed as -i after z c s zh ch sh r in pinyin; here it's also used to carry the tone for syllables where the medial is the rime, such as gu or mi. After b p m f, it is equivalent to pinyin -u.
- ⠊ is transcribed in pinyin as o after b p m f w and the medial u; otherwise it's e.

The rime er is written as if it were *ra; this is possible because *ra is not a possible syllable in Mandarin. At the end of a word, ⠔ -r is erhua, as in ⠣⠞⠔ huār (花儿). Within a word, hyphenate erhua (⠔⠤) to avoid confusion with an initial r- in the following syllable.

The exclamation ê is ⠐⠊, yo is ⠈⠊, and o is ⠠⠊, with appropriate modification for tone.

=== Combining onset and rime ===
Combinations of onset and rime follow the conventions of zhuyin, and are therefore not obvious from pinyin transcription.

- for pinyin -in, use medial -i- with rime -en; for -ing, use -i- and -eng
- for -un (the equivalent of wen), use -u- and -en; for -ong (the equivalent of weng), use -u- and -eng
- for -iong (the equivalent of yueng, though written yong in pinyin), use -ü- and -eng

Several syllables are palindromes, with the onset and rime written the same:

⠾⠾ ǎ, ⠊⠊ bò, ⠪⠪ mó, ⠮⠮ tuǒ, ⠯⠯ nuǎn, ⠗⠗ liāo, ⠧⠧ lǔ, ⠑⠑ jìng, ⠕⠕ qīng, ⠥⠥ kǔn, ⠓⠓ xiào, ⠣⠣ hú, ⠉⠉ zhòu, ⠙⠙ zàng, ⠍⠍ chōu, ⠝⠝ cāng, ⠋⠋ shàn, ⠛⠛ sài

A toneless or 4th-tone zero rime is omitted at the end of a polysyllabic word. (Words ending in ⠔⠃ rì (日) 'day' are an exception, to prevent confusion with the erhua suffix.) When context makes it unambiguous, the zero rime in other tones may also be omitted.

Sandhi is not rendered; rather, the inherent tone of a morpheme is written.

The following are rendered as toneless syllables:

- Interjections and grammatical particles such as 啊 a, 呀 ya, 哇 wa, 吧 ba, 啦 la, 呢 ne, 吗 ma.
- The verbal aspectual suffixes 了 -le, 着 -zhe, 过 -guo
- The nominal suffixes 子 -zi and 头 -tou.

==== Common abbreviations ====
Suffixes

⠂ 们 men
⠌ 的 de

⠁ 个 gè
⠇ 了 le

⠖ 是 shì

Words

⠵ 我 wǒ (⠵⠂⠌ 我们的 wǒmende)
⠟ 你 nǐ
⠞ 他 tā (⠈⠞ 她, ⠐⠞ 它)
⠋ 是 shì
⠭ 有 yǒu
⠪ 没 méi (⠪⠒ 没有 méiyǒu)
⠏ 能 néng
⠙ 在 zài (⠈⠙ 再 zài)
⠃ 和 hé
⠣ 时 shí

⠅ 可 kě (⠅⠒ 可以 kěyǐ)
⠱ 就 jiù (⠱⠖ 就是 jiùshi)
⠻ 还 hái (⠻⠖ 还是 háishi)
⠓ 要 yào
⠮ 也 yě
⠱⠉ 同志 tóngzhì
⠓⠏⠋⠕ 先生 xiānshēng
⠖⠇⠌⠡ 夫人 fūrén
⠓⠷⠑⠮ 小姐 xiǎojiě

⠊⠼⠑⠇ 北京 Běijīng
⠌⠎⠑⠇ 东京 Dōngjīng
⠨⠃⠱ 橫 Héng
⠨⠃ 弘 Hóng
⠨⠃ 閎 Hóng
⠨⠃ 宏 Hóng
⠨⠃⠹ 黄 Huáng
⠨⠑⠪ 杰 Jié
⠏⠑⠇ 南京 Nánjīng
⠋⠙⠃⠿ 上海 Shànghǎi
⠨⠡⠹ 王 Wáng
⠨⠡⠝ 汪 Wāng
⠓⠏⠁⠽ 香港 Xiānggǎng
⠇⠻ 来 lái

== Homophones ==
Some common homophones are distinguished by prefixing with a dot 4 ⠈ or 5 ⠐, or by dropping the rime:

- tā: 他 (he) ⠎⠞, 她 (she) ⠈⠎⠞, 它 (it) ⠐⠎⠞
- zài: 在 (at) ⠙⠛, 再 (again) ⠈⠙⠛
- shì: 是 (to be) ⠋, 事 (thing) ⠋⠃
  是 as a suffix is ⠖, like an initial f-

The three grammatical uses of non-tonic de are irregular:

- de: attributive 的 ⠌, adverbial 地 ⠜, complement 得 ⠌⠔

Often printed Chinese can be contracted, compared to speech, as unambiguous where a phonetic rendition such as braille would be ambiguous; in such cases, the sign ⟨⠘⟩ may be used to indicate the omitted syllables. For example, in the clause 露从今夜白 Lù cóng jīnyè bái, 露 lù means 'dew' (colloquial 露水 lùshuǐ). However, there are several other words transcribed ⠧⠃ lù in braille. To clarify, the –水 element of the colloquial word can be added with the ⟨⠘⟩ prefix:

⠧⠃⠘⠫⠼⠀⠽⠱⠀⠑⠅⠒⠊⠀⠊⠻
Lù(shuǐ) cóng jīnyè bái
露（水） 从 今夜 白

In other cases a synonym may be provided; here the prefix is ⟨⠸⟩. For example, in print the meaning of

两岸猿声啼
Liǎng'àn yuán shēng tí
(from both sides, the voices of monkeys cried out)

is clear, but in a phonetic script 猿 yuán 'monkey' and 啼 tí 'cry' can be obscure. The first can be clarified as 猿猴 yuánhóu 'primate' and the second with the parenthetical 叫 jiào 'call':

⠗⠽⠾⠋⠘⠀⠲⠫⠘⠃⠩⠋⠕⠀⠞⠣⠸⠑⠓
Liǎng'àn yuán(hóu) shēng tí (jiào)
两岸 猿（猴） 声 啼 （叫）

When longer parenthetical explanations are provided, the sign ⟨⠸⟩ is repeated before each word (not each syllable).

== Numbers ==
Numbers are the same as in other braille alphabets. Use the number sign ⠼ followed by ⠁ 1, ⠃ 2, ⠉ 3, ⠙ 4, ⠑ 5, ⠋ 6, ⠛ 7, ⠓ 8, ⠊ 9, ⠚ 0.

Notes are indicated as ⠔⠼⠁, ⠔⠼⠃, etc., sections as ⠬⠼⠉ etc.

== Formatting ==
emphasis	⠠
proper name	⠨
foreign script	⠰
number	⠼

⠼ is also used for reduplication rather than repeating a syllable or word. When attached to a word, it repeats a syllable; standing alone, it repeats a word:

⠳⠧⠼⠬⠎⠼
xǔxǔ-duōduō
许许多多

⠓⠙⠕⠫⠐⠀⠼⠐⠀⠼⠰⠂
Xiàngqián, xiàngqián, xiàngqián!
向前， 向前， 向前！

== Punctuation ==
Chinese braille punctuation is based on that of French Braille, but they are generally split between two cells. This gives them the 'full-width' feel of print Chinese, as well as avoiding confusion with letters.

clausal comma ⟨，⟩	⠐
phrasal comma ⟨、⟩	⠠
full stop / period ⟨。⟩	⠐⠆
question mark ⟨？⟩	⠐⠄
exclamation mark ⟨！⟩	⠰⠂
wave dash ⟨〜⟩	⠤
interpunct ⟨·⟩	⠐⠂
colon ⟨：⟩	⠠⠄
semicolon ⟨；⟩	⠰
ellipsis ⟨……⟩	⠐⠐⠐

	Outer	Inner
quotation marks 「 ... 」	⠰⠄ ... ⠠⠆	⠰⠢ ... ⠔⠆
title quotes 《 ... 》	⠐⠤ ... ⠤⠂	⠐⠄ ... ⠠⠂
parentheses （ ... ）	⠰⠤ ... ⠤⠆	⠰⠦ ... ⠴⠆

square brackets 〔 ... 〕	⠰⠆ ... ⠰⠆
dashes —— ... ——	⠠⠤ ... ⠤⠄
