= Mainland Chinese Braille =

Braille script used for Standard Chinese in mainland China

Chinese Braille ⠓⠩⠆⠓⠡⠂⠀⠍⠦⠂⠒⠂
- Script type: Semisyllabary
- Print basis: Pinyin, bopomofo
- Languages: Standard Chinese

Related scripts
- Parent systems: Night writing: Braille; Chinese Braille

Mainland Chinese Braille
- Traditional Chinese: 現行盲文
- Simplified Chinese: 现行盲文
- Literal meaning: Current Braille
Transcriptions
Standard Mandarin
- Hanyu Pinyin: Xiànxíng Mángwén

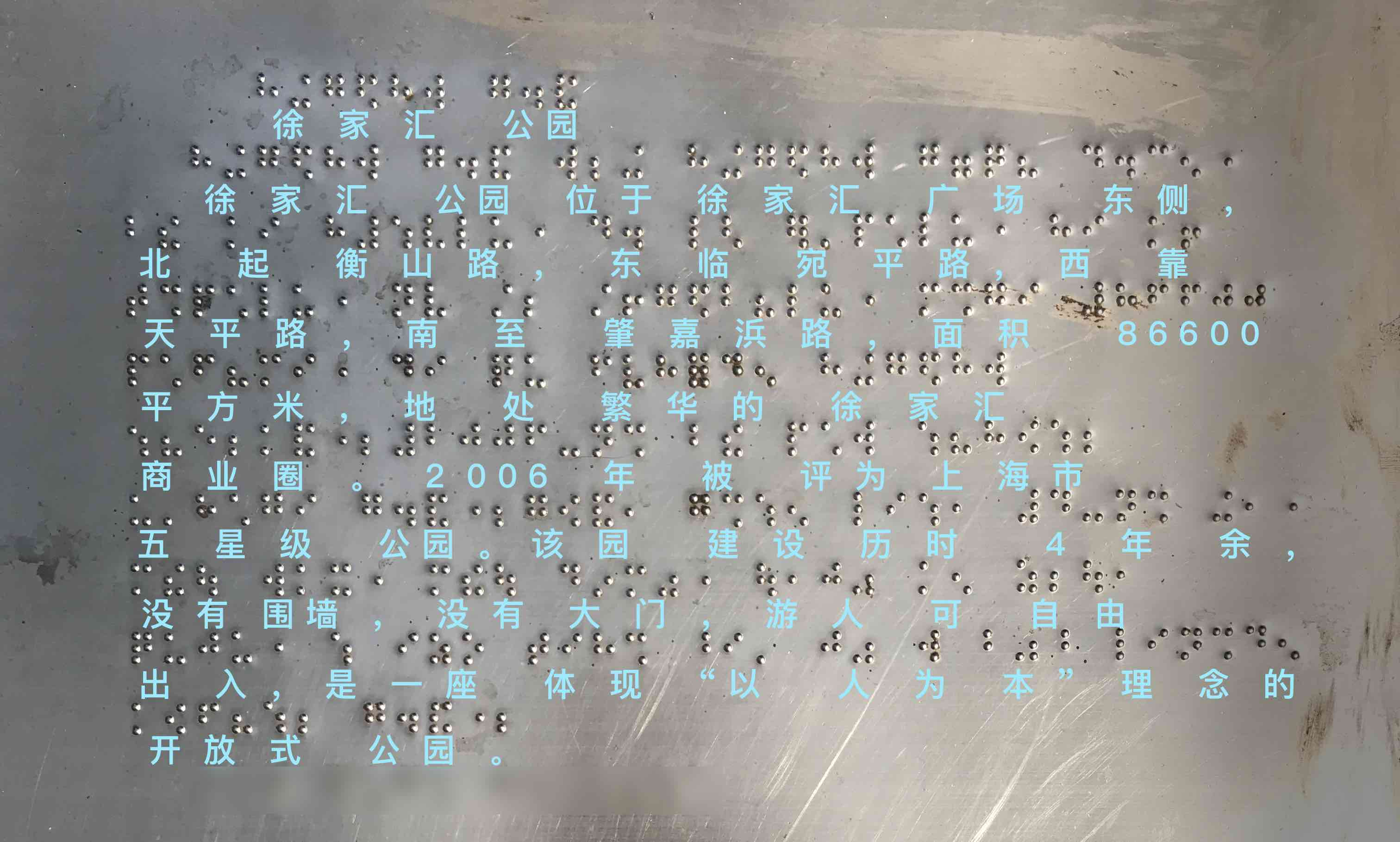
A sample Mainland Chinese Braille text in Xujiahui Park, Shanghai. Most of the tones are omitted except for in a few places that may cause confusion. Note that the vowel in the particle *de* is always written in this text, rather than being omitted.

Mainland Chinese Braille is a braille script for Standard Chinese used in China. Consonants and basic finals conform to international braille, but additional finals form a semi-syllabary, as in bopomofo. Each syllable is written with up to three Braille cells, representing the initial, final, and tone, respectively. In practice tone is generally omitted as it is in pinyin.

== Braille charts ==
Traditional Chinese Braille is as follows:

=== Initials ===
Chinese Braille initials generally follow the pinyin assignments of international braille. However, j, q, x are replaced with g, k, h, as the difference is predictable from the final. (This reflects the historical change of g, k, h (and also z, c, s) to j, q, x before i and ü.) The digraphs ch, sh, zh are assigned to ⠟ (its pronunciation in Russian Braille), ⠱ (a common pronunciation in international braille), and ⠌. R is assigned to ⠚, reflecting the old Wade-Giles transcription of ⟨j⟩. (⠗ is used for the final er, the pronunciation of the name of that letter in English Braille.)

Pinyin	b	p	m	f	d	t	n	l	g/j	k/q	h/x	zh	ch	sh	r	z	c	s
Bopomofo	ㄅ	ㄆ	ㄇ	ㄈ	ㄉ	ㄊ	ㄋ	ㄌ	ㄍ ㄐ	ㄎ ㄑ	ㄏ ㄒ	ㄓ	ㄔ	ㄕ	ㄖ	ㄗ	ㄘ	ㄙ
Braille	⠃ (braille pattern dots-12)	⠏ (braille pattern dots-1234)	⠍ (braille pattern dots-134)	⠋ (braille pattern dots-124)	⠙ (braille pattern dots-145)	⠞ (braille pattern dots-2345)	⠝ (braille pattern dots-1345)	⠇ (braille pattern dots-123)	⠛ (braille pattern dots-1245)	⠅ (braille pattern dots-13)	⠓ (braille pattern dots-125)	⠌ (braille pattern dots-34)	⠟ (braille pattern dots-12345)	⠱ (braille pattern dots-156)	⠚ (braille pattern dots-245)	⠵ (braille pattern dots-1356)	⠉ (braille pattern dots-14)	⠎ (braille pattern dots-234)

=== Finals ===
The finals approximate international braille values for several of the basic vowels (⠢ e (o), ⠊ yi, ⠕ wo, ⠥ wu, ⠬ yü, ⠳ you, ⠮ ei), but then necessarily diverge. However, there are a few parallels with other braille alphabets: ⠗ er and ⠽ wai are pronounced like the names of those letters in English braille; ⠑ ye, ⠫ ya, and ⠳ you are pronounced like those letters in Russian Braille. ⠯ yuan, ⠾ yue, ⠣ yin, are similar to the old French pronunciations oin, ieu, in. For the most part, however, Chinese Braille finals do not obviously derive from previous conventions.

The pinyin final -i is only written where it corresponds to yi. Otherwise* (in ci zi si ri chi zhi shi) no final is written, a convention also found in bopomofo. The final -e is not written in ⠙ de, a common grammatical particle written with several different characters in print.

Pinyin	Bopomofo	Braille
a	ㄚ	⠔ (braille pattern dots-35)
e/o	ㄛ ㄜ ㄝ	⠢ (braille pattern dots-26)
ai	ㄞ	⠪ (braille pattern dots-246)
ei	ㄟ	⠮ (braille pattern dots-2346)
ao	ㄠ	⠖ (braille pattern dots-235)
ou	ㄡ	⠷ (braille pattern dots-12356)
an	ㄢ	⠧ (braille pattern dots-1236)
en	ㄣ	⠴ (braille pattern dots-356)
ang	ㄤ	⠦ (braille pattern dots-236)
eng	ㄥ	⠼ (braille pattern dots-3456)

Pinyin	Bopomofo	Braille
yi, -i*	ㄧ	⠊ (braille pattern dots-24)
ya, -ia	ㄧㄚ	⠫ (braille pattern dots-1246)
ye, -ie	ㄧㄝ	⠑ (braille pattern dots-15)
yao, -iao	ㄧㄠ	⠜ (braille pattern dots-345)
you, -iu	ㄧㄡ	⠳ (braille pattern dots-1256)
yan, -ian	ㄧㄢ	⠩ (braille pattern dots-146)
yang, -iang	ㄧㄤ	⠭ (braille pattern dots-1346)
yin, -in	ㄧㄣ	⠣ (braille pattern dots-126)
ying, -ing	ㄧㄥ	⠡ (braille pattern dots-16)

Pinyin	Bopomofo	Braille
wu, -u	ㄨ	⠥ (braille pattern dots-136)
wa, -ua	ㄨㄚ	⠿ (braille pattern dots-123456)
wo, -uo	ㄨㄛ	⠕ (braille pattern dots-135)
wai, -uai	ㄨㄞ	⠽ (braille pattern dots-13456)
wei, -ui	ㄨㄟ	⠺ (braille pattern dots-2456)
wan, -uan	ㄨㄢ	⠻ (braille pattern dots-12456)
wen, -un	ㄨㄣ	⠒ (braille pattern dots-25)
wang, -uang	ㄨㄤ	⠶ (braille pattern dots-2356)
weng, -ong	ㄨㄥ	⠲ (braille pattern dots-256)

Pinyin	Bopomofo	Braille
yu, -ü	ㄩ	⠬ (braille pattern dots-346)
yue, -üe	ㄩㄝ	⠾ (braille pattern dots-23456)
yuan, -üan	ㄩㄢ	⠯ (braille pattern dots-12346)
yun, -ün	ㄩㄣ	⠸ (braille pattern dots-456)
yong, -iong	ㄩㄥ	⠹ (braille pattern dots-1456)
er	ㄦ	⠗ (braille pattern dots-1235)

=== Tones ===
Tone is marked sparingly.

Tone	1	2	3	4	neutral
Pinyin	¯	´	ˇ	`	(none)
Zhuyin	(none)	ˊ	ˇ	ˋ	˙
Braille	⠁ (braille pattern dots-1)	⠂ (braille pattern dots-2)	⠄ (braille pattern dots-3)	⠆ (braille pattern dots-23)	(none)

=== Punctuation ===
Chinese Braille punctuation approximates the form of international braille punctuation, but several spread the corresponding dots across two cells rather than one. For example, the period is ⠐⠆, which is the same pattern as the international single-cell norm of ⠲.

Print	。	，	、	？	！	：	；	-	—	…	·	（	）	［ and ］	《	》	“	”	‘	’
Chinese Braille	⠐ (braille pattern dots-5) ⠆ (braille pattern dots-23)	⠐ (braille pattern dots-5) ⠀ (braille pattern blank)	⠠ (braille pattern dots-6) ⠀ (braille pattern blank)	⠐ (braille pattern dots-5) ⠄ (braille pattern dots-3)	⠰ (braille pattern dots-56) ⠂ (braille pattern dots-2)	⠠ (braille pattern dots-6) ⠄ (braille pattern dots-3)	⠰ (braille pattern dots-56) ⠀ (braille pattern blank)	⠤ (braille pattern dots-36)	⠠ (braille pattern dots-6) ⠤ (braille pattern dots-36)	⠐ (braille pattern dots-5)	⠐ (braille pattern dots-5) ⠂ (braille pattern dots-2)	⠰ (braille pattern dots-56) ⠤ (braille pattern dots-36)	⠤ (braille pattern dots-36) ⠆ (braille pattern dots-23)	⠰ (braille pattern dots-56) ⠆ (braille pattern dots-23)	⠐ (braille pattern dots-5) ⠤ (braille pattern dots-36)	⠤ (braille pattern dots-36) ⠂ (braille pattern dots-2)	⠰ (braille pattern dots-56) ⠄ (braille pattern dots-3)	⠠ (braille pattern dots-6) ⠆ (braille pattern dots-23)	⠰ (braille pattern dots-56) ⠢ (braille pattern dots-26)	⠔ (braille pattern dots-35) ⠆ (braille pattern dots-23)
French equivalent	⠲	⠂		⠢	⠖	⠒	⠆	⠤		⠄⠄⠄	⠀	⠦	⠴	⠶						

=== Numbers ===
A braille cell ⠼ called number sign (simplified Chinese: 数号; traditional Chinese: 數號; pinyin: shùhào) is needed when representing numbers.

Number	1	2	3	4	5	6	7	8	9	0
Braille	⠁ (braille pattern dots-1)	⠃ (braille pattern dots-12)	⠉ (braille pattern dots-14)	⠙ (braille pattern dots-145)	⠑ (braille pattern dots-15)	⠋ (braille pattern dots-124)	⠛ (braille pattern dots-1245)	⠓ (braille pattern dots-125)	⠊ (braille pattern dots-24)	⠚ (braille pattern dots-245)

Examples:

⠼⠚ 0, ⠼⠁ 1, ⠼⠃ 2, … ⠼⠊ 9,
⠼⠁⠚ 10, ⠼⠁⠁ 11, ⠼⠁⠃ 12, … ⠼⠁⠊ 19, … ⠼⠃⠊ 29, … ⠼⠊⠊ 99,
⠼⠁⠚⠚ 100, ⠼⠃⠑⠋ 256, ⠼⠁⠚⠃⠙ 1024, ⠼⠁⠚⠙⠓⠑⠛⠋ 1048576.

=== Rules ===
- Spaces are added between words, rather than between syllables.
- Tone is marked when needed. It comes after the final.
- As in bopomofo, the finals of the syllables zi, ci, si, zhi, chi, shi, ri are not marked.

Two examples, the first with full tone marking, the second with tone for disambiguation only:

⠱⠂⠛⠩⠁ ⠃⠥⠆ ⠵⠖⠄ ⠇⠢⠰⠂
时间 不 早 了！
Shíjiān bù zǎo le!
time not early PFV

⠉⠖⠄⠙⠊⠆ ⠱⠦ ⠙ ⠓⠿⠁ ⠱⠆ ⠋⠼ ⠟⠺⠅⠪ ⠙⠐⠆
草地 上 的 花 是 风 吹开 的。
cǎodì shang de huā shi feng chuikai de.
grass above which flower is wind blow by
The meaning of this metaphorical sentence should be “Flowers on the grasslands bloom because of the blowing wind.”

=== Ambiguity ===
Chinese Braille has the same low level of ambiguity that pinyin does. In practice, tone is omitted 95% of the time, which leads to a space saving of a third. Tone is also omitted in pinyin military telegraphy, and causes little confusion in context.

The initial pairs g/j, k/q, h/x are distinguished by the final: initials j, q, x are followed by the vowels i or ü, while the initials g, k, h are followed by other vowels. This reflects the historical derivation of j, q, x from g, k, h before i and ü, and parallels the dual pronunciations of c and g in Spanish and Italian. In pinyin, the redundancy is resolved in the other direction, with the diaeresis omitted from ü after j, q, x. Thus braille ⟨gü⟩ is equivalent to pinyin ju:

⠛⠥ gu,
⠛⠬ ju.

== Usage ==
The China Library for the Blind (Chinese: 中国盲文图书馆) in Beijing has several thousand volumes, mostly published by the China Braille Press (Chinese: 中国盲文出版社). The National Taiwan Library has a Braille room with a postal mail service and some electronic documents.

== See also ==
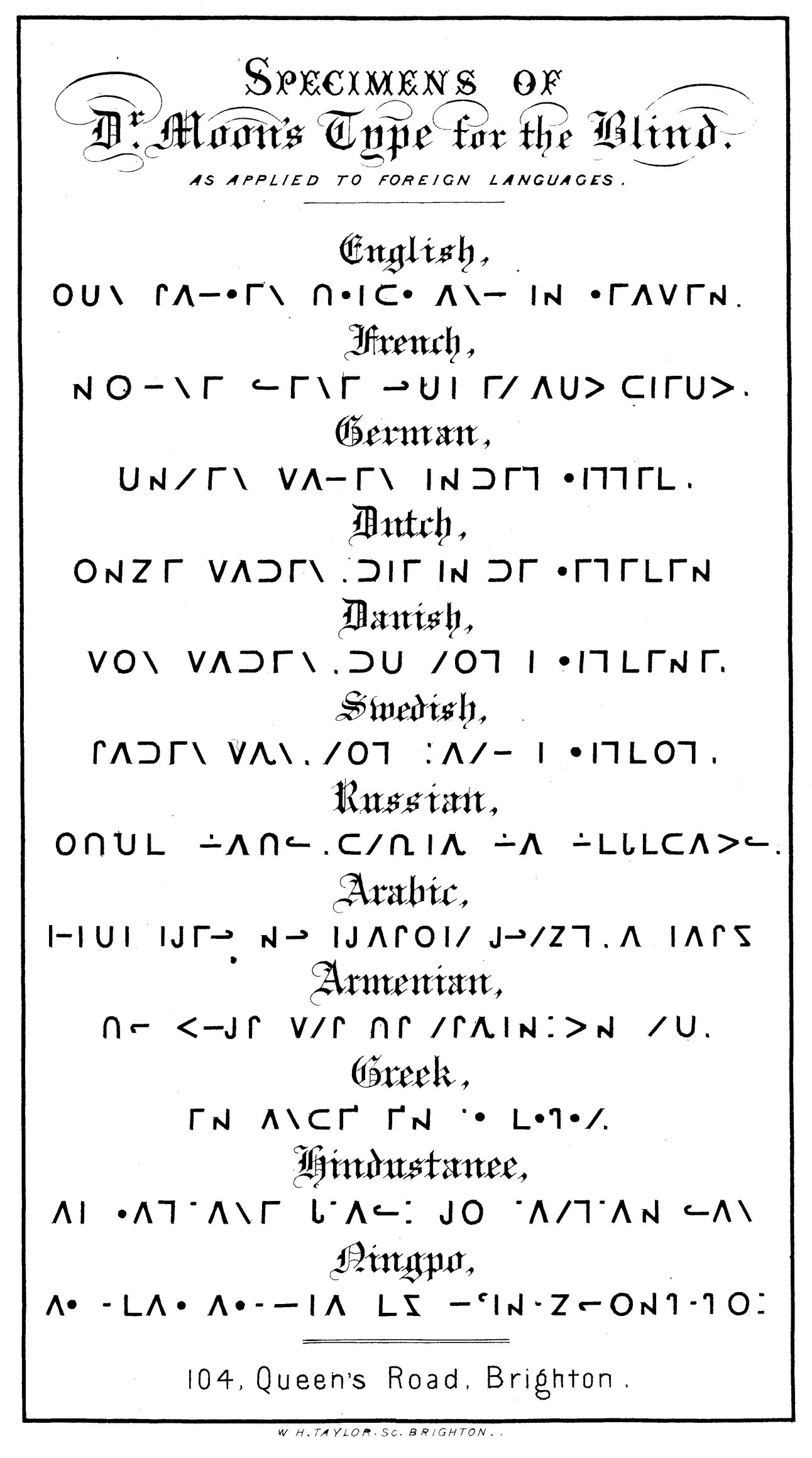
A sample of Moon type in various languages including Ningbo Chinese.

- Two-cell Chinese Braille
- Taiwanese Braille
- Cantonese Braille
- Moon type is a simplification of the Latin alphabet for embossing. An adaptation for Ningbo-reading blind people has been proposed.
