= Braille Patterns =

- Range: U+2800..U+28FF (256 code points)
- Plane: BMP
- Scripts: Braille
- Assigned: 256 code points
- Unused: 0 reserved code points
- Source standards: ISO 11548-1

Unicode Version History
- 3.0 (1999): 256 (+256)

Unicode documentation
- Code chart ∣ Web page

The Unicode block Braille Patterns (U+2800..U+28FF) contains all 256 possible patterns of an 8-dot braille cell, thereby including the complete 6-dot cell range. In Unicode, a braille cell does not have a letter or meaning defined. For example, Unicode does not define U+2817 ⠗ BRAILLE PATTERN DOTS-1235 to be "R".

== Independent script ==
In themselves, braille letters do not belong to any print script, but constitute a distinct braille script. The same braille letter can be used to transcribe multiple scripts, e.g., Latin, Cyrillic, Greek and even elements of Chinese characters, as well as digits. Thus, while U+2813 ⠓ BRAILLE PATTERN DOTS-125 transcribes the letter h of the Latin script, as well as the digit 8, it transcribes ᄐ t- of Korean hangul and り ri of Japanese kana.

The Unicode character property of braille characters is set to "So" (Symbol, other) rather than to "Lo" (Letter, other). The ISO 15924 script code for braille "Brai".

== Character numbering and encoding ==
Braille dot numbering

Hexadecimal value of braille dots

The coding is in accordance with ISO/TR 11548-1 Communication aids for blind persons. Unicode uses the standard dot-numbering 1 to 8. Historically only the 6-dot cell was used in braille. The lower two dots were added later, which explains the irregular numbering 1-2-3-7 in the left column and 4-5-6-8 in the right column. Where dots 7 and 8 are not raised, there is no distinction between 6-dot and 8-dot definitions.

In the 8-dot cell, each dot individually can be raised or not. That creates 2^{8}=256 different patterns. By mapping each of the eight dots to a bit in a byte (in a little-endian order), and by defining "0"/"1" for not raised/raised per bit, every specific pattern generates an identifying binary number. So the pattern with dots 1-2-5 raised would yield (00010011)_{2}, equivalent to (13)_{16} or (19)_{10}.

The mapping can also be computed by adding together the hexadecimal values, seen at right, of the dots raised. So the pattern with dots 1-2-5 raised would yield 1_{16}+2_{16}+10_{16} = 13_{16}. Whether computed directly in hexadecimal, or indirectly via binary, the result is added to 2800_{16}, the offset for the Braille Patterns Unicode block.

Unicode: Braille Pattern encoding examples
Braille symbol	⠓	⣇	⣿
Unicode character	U+2813	U+28C7	U+28FF
Name	BRAILLE PATTERN DOTS-125	BRAILLE PATTERN DOTS-12378	BRAILLE PATTERN DOTS-12345678
Dot numbers available	1 2 3 4 5 6 7 8	1 2 3 4 5 6 7 8	1 2 3 4 5 6 7 8
Dot raised=1	1 1 0 0 1 0 0 0	1 1 1 0 0 0 1 1	1 1 1 1 1 1 1 1
Reverse order (lowest value right, as in decimal notation)	0 0 0 1 0 0 1 1_{2}	1 1 0 0 0 1 1 1_{2}	1 1 1 1 1 1 1 1_{2}
Hex value of dots	10+2+1_{16}	80+40+4+2+1_{16}	80+40+20+10+8+4+2+1_{16}
Total hexadecimal value	13_{16}	C7_{16}	FF_{16}
Into block, offset U+2800_{16}	2800_{16}+13_{16}=U+2813	2800_{16}+C7_{16}=U+28C7	2800_{16}+FF_{16}=U+28FF

There is no regular mapping to the braille ASCII numbering.

=== Unicode character names ===
The Unicode name of a specific pattern mentions the raised dots: U+2813 ⠓ BRAILLE PATTERN DOTS-125 has dots 1, 2 and 5 raised. By exception, the zero dot raised pattern is named U+2800 ⠀ BRAILLE PATTERN BLANK.

=== Colloquial names ===
The Unicode names of braille dot patterns are not the same as what many English speakers would use colloquially. In particular, Unicode names use the word dots in the plural even when only one dot is listed: thus, Unicode says braille pattern dots-5 when most English-speaking users of braille would simply say "braille dot 5" or just "dot 5".

In addition, some English-speaking users of braille use the word "and" when listing only two dots. Thus, braille pattern dots-45 would be spoken as "braille dots 4 and 5". The word "and" is not always used when listing many dots, however.

== Unicode Block ==
Braille was added to the Unicode Standard in September 1999 with the release of version 3.0.

When using punching, the filled (black) dots are to be punched.

The Unicode block for braille is U+2800 ... U+28FF:

Braille Patterns^{[1]} Official Unicode Consortium code chart (PDF)
	0	1	2	3	4	5	6	7	8	9	A	B	C	D	E	F
U+280x	⠀	⠁	⠂	⠃	⠄	⠅	⠆	⠇	⠈	⠉	⠊	⠋	⠌	⠍	⠎	⠏
U+281x	⠐	⠑	⠒	⠓	⠔	⠕	⠖	⠗	⠘	⠙	⠚	⠛	⠜	⠝	⠞	⠟
U+282x	⠠	⠡	⠢	⠣	⠤	⠥	⠦	⠧	⠨	⠩	⠪	⠫	⠬	⠭	⠮	⠯
U+283x	⠰	⠱	⠲	⠳	⠴	⠵	⠶	⠷	⠸	⠹	⠺	⠻	⠼	⠽	⠾	⠿
(end of 6-dot cell patterns)
U+284x	⡀	⡁	⡂	⡃	⡄	⡅	⡆	⡇	⡈	⡉	⡊	⡋	⡌	⡍	⡎	⡏
U+285x	⡐	⡑	⡒	⡓	⡔	⡕	⡖	⡗	⡘	⡙	⡚	⡛	⡜	⡝	⡞	⡟
U+286x	⡠	⡡	⡢	⡣	⡤	⡥	⡦	⡧	⡨	⡩	⡪	⡫	⡬	⡭	⡮	⡯
U+287x	⡰	⡱	⡲	⡳	⡴	⡵	⡶	⡷	⡸	⡹	⡺	⡻	⡼	⡽	⡾	⡿
U+288x	⢀	⢁	⢂	⢃	⢄	⢅	⢆	⢇	⢈	⢉	⢊	⢋	⢌	⢍	⢎	⢏
U+289x	⢐	⢑	⢒	⢓	⢔	⢕	⢖	⢗	⢘	⢙	⢚	⢛	⢜	⢝	⢞	⢟
U+28Ax	⢠	⢡	⢢	⢣	⢤	⢥	⢦	⢧	⢨	⢩	⢪	⢫	⢬	⢭	⢮	⢯
U+28Bx	⢰	⢱	⢲	⢳	⢴	⢵	⢶	⢷	⢸	⢹	⢺	⢻	⢼	⢽	⢾	⢿
U+28Cx	⣀	⣁	⣂	⣃	⣄	⣅	⣆	⣇	⣈	⣉	⣊	⣋	⣌	⣍	⣎	⣏
U+28Dx	⣐	⣑	⣒	⣓	⣔	⣕	⣖	⣗	⣘	⣙	⣚	⣛	⣜	⣝	⣞	⣟
U+28Ex	⣠	⣡	⣢	⣣	⣤	⣥	⣦	⣧	⣨	⣩	⣪	⣫	⣬	⣭	⣮	⣯
U+28Fx	⣰	⣱	⣲	⣳	⣴	⣵	⣶	⣷	⣸	⣹	⣺	⣻	⣼	⣽	⣾	⣿
Notes 1.As of Unicode version 18.0

=== Font variations ===
When showing braille graphically in printed instruction manuals, it can be useful to indicate the dots that are not punched, especially if a single braille cell of only one or two punched dots is shown out of context: in this case it might otherwise be difficult to judge the vertical alignment of the dots and tell the difference between, say, dots 2 and 4 versus dots 3 and 5.

The current Unicode charts, and some fonts, use empty circles to indicate dots that are not punched. This does not always render very clearly: if the circle outlines are printed heavily then it can be difficult to tell at a glance whether the dot is filled in or not. The braille package for LaTeX (and several printed publications such as the printed manual for the new international braille music code) shows unpunched dots as very small dots (much smaller than the filled-in dots) rather than circles, and this tends to print better.

Some braille fonts do not indicate unpunched dots at all. Additionally, some Linux braille fonts (e.g., GNU Unifont and the DejaVu fonts) use small squares instead of small circles to indicate dots.

== Other uses ==
The Braille Pattern characters are commonly used in terminal applications as a way to draw multiple pixels per character.

The messaging app Telegram sometimes uses 8-dot-Braile to denote a hidden part of a message, especially when such a hidden message is cited in another message.

== History ==
The following Unicode-related documents record the purpose and process of defining specific characters in the Braille Patterns block:

Documents relating to the addition of Braille Patterns to Unicode
Version	Final code points (Note: Proposed code points and character names may differ from the final code points and names.)	Count	UTC ID	L2 ID	WG2 ID	Document
3.0	U+2800..28FF	256		X3L2/90-064		Extracts from "A Proposal for Funding the Programs of Braille Research and Literacy", 1990-01-01
3.0	U+2800..28FF	256		X3L2/91-085		TC 173 Proposals for new work items for Braille Coding, 1991-03-20
3.0	U+2800..28FF	256		X3L2/92-039		Bishop, Avery (1991-10-29), The long awaited draft reply on Braille symbol encoding
3.0	U+2800..28FF	256			N1093	Shibano, Kohji (1994-12-26), Braille Letters
3.0	U+2800..28FF	256			N1203	Umamaheswaran, V. S.; Ksar, Mike (1995-05-03), "6.1.3.3", Unconfirmed minutes of SC2/WG2 Meeting 27, Geneva
3.0	U+2800..28FF	256		X3L2/95-114	N1279	Braille letters (addition request), 1995-10-27
3.0	U+2800..28FF	256			N1303 (html, doc)	Umamaheswaran, V. S.; Ksar, Mike (1996-01-26), "8.14 Braille", Minutes of Meeting 29, Tokyo
3.0	U+2800..28FF	256		X3L2/95-125		Duran, Peter (1990-05-24), A Proposal for Funding the Programs of Braille Research and Literacy
3.0	U+2800..28FF	256	UTC/1996-002			Aliprand, Joan; Hart, Edwin; Greenfield, Steve (1996-03-05), "Braille", UTC #67 Minutes
3.0	U+2800..28FF	256	UTC/1996-007			Hart, Edwin (1996-03-07), Contribution on Encoding Braille in ISO/IEC 10646
3.0	U+2800..28FF	256			N1342	Sato, Takayuki K. (1996-03-19), Braille letters (confirmation of request)
3.0	U+2800..28FF	256			N1339	Ksar, Mike (1996-03-28), Liaison Letter on Braille to ISO/TC137 Secretariat
3.0	U+2800..28FF	256			N1345	Hart, Edwin (1996-04-01), Initial comments on encoding Braille into ISO/IEC 10646
3.0	U+2800..28FF	256			N1353	Umamaheswaran, V. S.; Ksar, Mike (1996-06-25), "8.9", Draft minutes of WG2 Copenhagen Meeting # 30
3.0	U+2800..28FF	256	UTC/1996-027.2			Greenfield, Steve (1996-07-01), "K. Braille Proposal", UTC #69 Minutes (PART 2)
3.0	U+2800..28FF	256			N1409R	Braille Symbols, 1996-08-12
3.0	U+2800..28FF	256			N1453	Ksar, Mike; Umamaheswaran, V. S. (1996-12-06), "8.9", WG 2 Minutes - Quebec Meeting 31
3.0	U+2800..28FF	256		L2/97-047	N1541	Everson, Michael (1997-03-11), Proposed pDAM text for Braille
3.0	U+2800..28FF	256			N1588	DIS 11 548-1 - Communication aids for blind persons Part 1: Braille identifiers and shift marks - General guidelines, 1997-06-23
3.0	U+2800..28FF	256			N1588.1	DIS 11 548-2 - Communication aids for blind persons Part 2: Latin alphabet based character sets
3.0	U+2800..28FF	256		L2/97-157	N1612	Report of ad-hoc group on Braille encoding, 1997-07-01
3.0	U+2800..28FF	256		L2/97-288	N1603	Umamaheswaran, V. S. (1997-10-24), "8.4", Unconfirmed Meeting Minutes, WG 2 Meeting # 33, Heraklion, Crete, Greece, 20 June – 4 July 1997
3.0	U+2800..28FF	256		L2/98-136	N1770	Paterson, Bruce (1998-04-06), Revised Text of 10646-1/FPDAM 16: Amendment 16: Braille Patterns
3.0	U+2800..28FF	256		L2/98-286	N1703	Umamaheswaran, V. S.; Ksar, Mike (1998-07-02), "6.2.2 FPDAM-16 - Braille patterns", Unconfirmed Meeting Minutes, WG 2 Meeting #34, Redmond, WA, USA; 1998-03-16--20
