= IPA Braille =

Braille encoding of the International Phonetic Alphabet

International in Received Pronunciation and its Braille encoding.

IPA Braille is the modern standard Braille encoding of the International Phonetic Alphabet (IPA), as recognized by the International Council on English Braille.

A braille version of the IPA was first created by Merrick and Potthoff in 1934, and published in London. It was used in France, Germany, and anglophone countries. However, it was not updated as the IPA evolved, and by 1989 had become obsolete. In 1990 it was officially reissued by BAUK, but in a corrupted form that made it largely unworkable. In 1997 BANA created a completely new system for the United States and Canada. However, it was incompatible with braille IPA elsewhere in the world and in addition proved to be cumbersome and often inadequate. In 2008 Robert Englebretson revised the Merrick and Potthoff notation and by 2011 this had been accepted by BANA. (Note: IPA Braille (BANA). According to the minutes of BAUK, BANA had withdrawn its idiosyncratic system by 2008, and BAUK was considering adopting IPA Braille at that time.) It is largely true to the original in consonants and vowels, though the diacritics were completely reworked, as necessitated by the major revisions in print IPA diacritics since 1934. The diacritics were also made more systematic, and follow rather than precede the base letters. However, it has no general procedure for marking tone, and not all diacritics can be written.

IPA Braille does not use the conventions of English Braille. It is set off by slash or square brackets, which indicate that the intervening material is IPA rather than national orthography. Thus brackets are required in braille even when not used in print.

== Basic letters ==
The 26 letters of the basic Latin alphabet are the same as in international braille:

Braille (image)	⠁ (braille pattern dots-1)	⠃ (braille pattern dots-12)	⠉ (braille pattern dots-14)	⠙ (braille pattern dots-145)	⠑ (braille pattern dots-15)	⠋ (braille pattern dots-124)	⠛ (braille pattern dots-1245)	⠓ (braille pattern dots-125)	⠊ (braille pattern dots-24)	⠚ (braille pattern dots-245)	⠅ (braille pattern dots-13)	⠇ (braille pattern dots-123)	⠍ (braille pattern dots-134)
Braille (font)	⠁	⠃	⠉	⠙	⠑	⠋	⠛	⠓	⠊	⠚	⠅	⠇	⠍
Print	a	b	c	d	e	f	ɡ	h	i	j	k	l	m
	⠝ (braille pattern dots-1345)	⠕ (braille pattern dots-135)	⠏ (braille pattern dots-1234)	⠟ (braille pattern dots-12345)	⠗ (braille pattern dots-1235)	⠎ (braille pattern dots-234)	⠞ (braille pattern dots-2345)	⠥ (braille pattern dots-136)	⠧ (braille pattern dots-1236)	⠺ (braille pattern dots-2456)	⠭ (braille pattern dots-1346)	⠽ (braille pattern dots-13456)	⠵ (braille pattern dots-1356)
	⠝	⠕	⠏	⠟	⠗	⠎	⠞	⠥	⠧	⠺	⠭	⠽	⠵
	n	o	p	q	r	s	t	u	v	w	x	y	z

In addition, there are the following dedicated letters:

⠡ (braille pattern dots-16)	⠜ (braille pattern dots-345)	⠣ (braille pattern dots-126)	⠳ (braille pattern dots-1256)	⠪ (braille pattern dots-246)	⠌ (braille pattern dots-34)	⠷ (braille pattern dots-12356)	⠬ (braille pattern dots-346)	⠢ (braille pattern dots-26)	⠩ (braille pattern dots-146)
⠡	⠜	⠣	⠳	⠪	⠌	⠷	⠬	⠢	⠩
ɑ	ɛ	ɔ	ø	œ	ɪ	ʊ	ʌ	ə	æ

⠆ (braille pattern dots-23)	⠿ (braille pattern dots-123456)	⠫ (braille pattern dots-1246)	⠱ (braille pattern dots-156)	⠮ (braille pattern dots-2346)	⠼ (braille pattern dots-3456)	⠻ (braille pattern dots-12456)	⠒ (braille pattern dots-25)	⠐ (braille pattern dots-5) ⠂ (braille pattern dots-2)
⠆	⠿	⠫	⠱	⠮	⠼	⠻	⠒	⠐ ⠂
ʔ	ɲ	ŋ	ʃ	ʒ	ɹ	ð	ː	ˑ

Following a pattern found in many national alphabets, a few braille letters are reversed to represent a similar letter: thus reversed ⟨n, s, z⟩ produces ⟨ŋ, ʃ, ʒ⟩. The choice for ⟨ɹ⟩ may reflect the shape of that letter in print. Many of the vowels are used for modified vowels in national alphabets, such as French Braille.

A few other letters such as ⠹ occur, but only as parts of digraphs.

== Modified letters ==
Other IPA letters are indicated with digraphs or even trigraphs usinɡ 5th-decade letters (letters from the punctuation row). The component letter ⠲ ".", for example, is equivalent to the tail of the retroflex consonants, deriving from the old IPA convention of a subscript dot for retroflex. It also marks vowels which in print are formed by rotating the letter. (Note: For this purpose, ⟨ɤ⟩ is treated as a rotated ⟨o⟩, and ⟨ɯ⟩ as a rotated ⟨u⟩ rather than ⟨m⟩.)

⠲ (braille pattern dots-256) ⠙ (braille pattern dots-145)	⠲ (braille pattern dots-256) ⠇ (braille pattern dots-123)	⠲ (braille pattern dots-256) ⠝ (braille pattern dots-1345)	⠲ (braille pattern dots-256) ⠗ (braille pattern dots-1235)	⠲ (braille pattern dots-256) ⠼ (braille pattern dots-3456)	⠲ (braille pattern dots-256) ⠎ (braille pattern dots-234)	⠲ (braille pattern dots-256) ⠞ (braille pattern dots-2345)	⠲ (braille pattern dots-256) ⠵ (braille pattern dots-1356)
⠲ ⠙	⠲ ⠇	⠲ ⠝	⠲ ⠗	⠲ ⠼	⠲ ⠎	⠲ ⠞	⠲ ⠵
ɖ	ɭ	ɳ	ɽ	ɻ	ʂ	ʈ	ʐ

⠲ (braille pattern dots-256) ⠁ (braille pattern dots-1)	⠲ (braille pattern dots-256) ⠡ (braille pattern dots-16)	⠲ (braille pattern dots-256) ⠑ (braille pattern dots-15)	⠲ (braille pattern dots-256) ⠜ (braille pattern dots-345)	⠲ (braille pattern dots-256) ⠓ (braille pattern dots-125)	⠲ (braille pattern dots-256) ⠕ (braille pattern dots-135)	⠲ (braille pattern dots-256) ⠥ (braille pattern dots-136)
⠲ ⠁	⠲ ⠡	⠲ ⠑	⠲ ⠜	⠲ ⠓	⠲ ⠕	⠲ ⠥
ɐ	ɒ	ɘ	ɜ	ɥ	ɤ	ɯ

Similarly, ⠔ is used to derive small capital variants, as well as ⟨ʢ⟩ (from ʔ). (Note: For this purpose, ⟨ɟ⟩ is treated as a small capital J)

⠔ (braille pattern dots-35) ⠃ (braille pattern dots-12)	⠔ (braille pattern dots-35) ⠛ (braille pattern dots-1245)	⠔ (braille pattern dots-35) ⠓ (braille pattern dots-125)	⠔ (braille pattern dots-35) ⠚ (braille pattern dots-245)	⠔ (braille pattern dots-35) ⠇ (braille pattern dots-123)	⠔ (braille pattern dots-35) ⠝ (braille pattern dots-1345)
⠔ ⠃	⠔ ⠛	⠔ ⠓	⠔ ⠚	⠔ ⠇	⠔ ⠝
ʙ	ɢ	ʜ	ɟ	ʟ	ɴ

⠔ (braille pattern dots-35) ⠪ (braille pattern dots-246)	⠔ (braille pattern dots-35) ⠗ (braille pattern dots-1235)	⠔ (braille pattern dots-35) ⠼ (braille pattern dots-3456)	⠔ (braille pattern dots-35) ⠽ (braille pattern dots-13456)	⠔ (braille pattern dots-35) ⠆ (braille pattern dots-23)
⠔ ⠪	⠔ ⠗	⠔ ⠼	⠔ ⠽	⠔ ⠆
ɶ	ʀ	ʁ	ʏ	ʢ

⠦ "?" is used for hook tops, curly tails, and other loops; turned letters with tails; closed ⟨ɞ⟩ (from ⟨ɛ⟩), and ⟨ʡ⟩.

⠦ (braille pattern dots-236) ⠃ (braille pattern dots-12)	⠦ (braille pattern dots-236) ⠙ (braille pattern dots-145)	⠦ (braille pattern dots-236) ⠔ (braille pattern dots-35) ⠚ (braille pattern dots-245)	⠦ (braille pattern dots-236) ⠛ (braille pattern dots-1245)	⠦ (braille pattern dots-236) ⠔ (braille pattern dots-35) ⠛ (braille pattern dots-1245)	⠦ (braille pattern dots-236) ⠓ (braille pattern dots-125)	⠦ (braille pattern dots-236) ⠫ (braille pattern dots-1246)	⠦ (braille pattern dots-236) ⠚ (braille pattern dots-245)
⠦ ⠃	⠦ ⠙	⠦ ⠔ ⠚	⠦ ⠛	⠦ ⠔ ⠛	⠦ ⠓	⠦ ⠫	⠦ ⠚
ɓ	ɗ	ʄ	ɠ	ʛ	ɦ	ɧ	ʝ

⠦ (braille pattern dots-236) ⠇ (braille pattern dots-123)	⠦ (braille pattern dots-236) ⠉ (braille pattern dots-14)	⠦ (braille pattern dots-236) ⠵ (braille pattern dots-1356)	⠦ (braille pattern dots-236) ⠧ (braille pattern dots-1236)	⠦ (braille pattern dots-236) ⠽ (braille pattern dots-13456)	⠦ (braille pattern dots-236) ⠍ (braille pattern dots-134)	⠦ (braille pattern dots-236) ⠼ (braille pattern dots-3456)	⠦ (braille pattern dots-236) ⠜ (braille pattern dots-345)	⠦ (braille pattern dots-236) ⠆ (braille pattern dots-23)
⠦ ⠇	⠦ ⠉	⠦ ⠵	⠦ ⠧	⠦ ⠽	⠦ ⠍	⠦ ⠼	⠦ ⠜	⠦ ⠆
ɬ	ɕ	ʑ	ʋ	ʎ	ɰ	ɺ	ɞ	ʡ

⠨ is used for fricatives written with Greek letters, using the English conventions for Greek letters in scientific notation. The basic braille letters ⠹ and ⠯, which do not occur on their own in IPA usage, appear here.

⠨ (braille pattern dots-46) ⠋ (braille pattern dots-124)	⠨ (braille pattern dots-46) ⠃ (braille pattern dots-12)	⠨ (braille pattern dots-46) ⠹ (braille pattern dots-1456)	⠨ (braille pattern dots-46) ⠛ (braille pattern dots-1245)	⠨ (braille pattern dots-46) ⠯ (braille pattern dots-12346)
⠨ ⠋	⠨ ⠃	⠨ ⠹	⠨ ⠛	⠨ ⠯
ɸ	β	θ	ɣ	χ

⠨ is also used with letters of the fifth decade for transcriber-defined symbols, which need to be specified for each text, as they have no set meaning. These are ⠨⠂, ⠨⠆, ⠨⠒, ⠨⠲, ⠨⠢, ⠨⠖, ⠨⠶, ⠨⠦, ⠨⠔, ⠨⠴.

⠴ is used for barred vowels.

⠴ (braille pattern dots-356) ⠊ (braille pattern dots-24)	⠴ (braille pattern dots-356) ⠕ (braille pattern dots-135)	⠴ (braille pattern dots-356) ⠥ (braille pattern dots-136)
⠴ ⠊	⠴ ⠕	⠴ ⠥
ɨ	ɵ	ʉ

⠖ is used for other hooks, as in flaps, as well as a couple barred and turned letters.

⠖ (braille pattern dots-235) ⠉ (braille pattern dots-14)	⠖ (braille pattern dots-235) ⠗ (braille pattern dots-1235)	⠖ (braille pattern dots-235) ⠧ (braille pattern dots-1236)	⠖ (braille pattern dots-235) ⠍ (braille pattern dots-134)	⠖ (braille pattern dots-235) ⠓ (braille pattern dots-125)	⠖ (braille pattern dots-235) ⠇ (braille pattern dots-123)	⠖ (braille pattern dots-235) ⠺ (braille pattern dots-2456)	⠖ (braille pattern dots-235) ⠆ (braille pattern dots-23)
⠖ ⠉	⠖ ⠗	⠖ ⠧	⠖ ⠍	⠖ ⠓	⠖ ⠇	⠖ ⠺	⠖ ⠆
ç	ɾ	ⱱ	ɱ	ħ	ɫ	ʍ	ʕ

⠯ is used for click letters. These are far more legible in braille than in print, and there is no distinction from the old click letters.

⠯ (braille pattern dots-12346) ⠏ (braille pattern dots-1234)	⠯ (braille pattern dots-12346) ⠹ (braille pattern dots-1456)	⠯ (braille pattern dots-12346) ⠞ (braille pattern dots-2345)	⠯ (braille pattern dots-12346) ⠱ (braille pattern dots-156)	⠯ (braille pattern dots-12346) ⠇ (braille pattern dots-123)
⠯ ⠏	⠯ ⠹	⠯ ⠞	⠯ ⠱	⠯ ⠇
ʘ	ǀ	ǃ	ǂ	ǁ

Ligatures, regardless of whether these are written with a tie bar or as actual ligatures in print, are indicated by dot 5, so ⟨t͜ʃ⟩ and ⟨ʧ⟩ are both ⠞⠐⠱. This includes the historic ligatures ⟨ɮ⟩ ⠇⠐⠮ and ⟨ɚ⟩ ⠢⠐⠗. Ejectives are written as ligatures with an apostrophe, ⠄, so ⟨tʼ⟩ is ⠞⠐⠄.

== Diacritics ==
IPA Braille diacritics are written in two cells. The first indicates the position: whether superscript, mid-line, or subscript. ⠻, for example, is the tilde. ⠁⠈⠻ is therefore nasal ⟨ã⟩, ⠁⠠⠻ is creaky-voiced ⟨a̰⟩, and ⠎⠐⠻ is pharyngealized ⟨s̴⟩. As noted above, dot 5 is used for the tie bar; the only diacritics which use it are the rhotic and ejective (apostrophe) diacritics seen above, and the velar/pharyngeal tilde just illustrated.

In other cases, such as the ring for voiceless ⟨l̥ ŋ̊⟩, a diacritic may superscript or subscript with no change in meaning. The distinction is therefore not necessary in braille, but can be maintained if the text is to be transliterated into print. The wedge, which indicates voicing when below a letter, can be placed above to represent Americanist notation such as ⟨š⟩ and ⟨č⟩. The placement dot distinguishes the tilde from the letter ⟨ð⟩, and the ring from the letter ⟨ŋ⟩. (Note: It is therefore not possible to transcribe superscript ⟨ᶞ⟩ or ⟨ᵑ⟩ without some additional convention, such as the voiceless diacritic always being subscript, and the superscript indicating an engma in for example ⟨ᵑǃ⟩. Or braille click notation could substitute the proper tilde and the voicing diacritics for the ad hoc superscript engma and gee generally used in print, as the diacritics do not have the legibility problems in braille that they have in print.) Many diacritics are identical in form to the corresponding symbols in Unified English Braille, but always follow the letter in IPA Braille. When there is more than one diacritic, they are written in the order lowest to highest.

Superscript letters are simply the superscript placement dot plus the base letter. So: ⠀⠈⠓ ⟨◌ʰ⟩, ⠀⠈⠚ ⟨◌ʲ⟩, ⠀⠈⠇ ⟨◌ˡ⟩, ⠀⠈⠝ ⟨◌ⁿ⟩, ⠀⠈⠺ ⟨◌ʷ⟩, ⠀⠈⠨⠛ ⟨◌ˠ⟩, ⠀⠈⠖⠆ ⟨◌ˤ⟩, etc., though not all superscript letters are possible. (Note: The IPA letters which duplicate diacritics and which therefore cannot be written as superscripts are ⟨ɑ æ c d ð e ə i ɪ ŋ ʊ x ː⟩. Of these, superscript ⟨i ŋ⟩ are fairly common in print and ⟨d ə x⟩ appear in the IPA Handbook. ⠈⠆ is similarly potentially ambiguous between superscript ⟨ʔ⟩ and the extra-IPA diacritic ⟨◌̍⟩ that is sometimes seen in transcriptions of languages with four- or six-tone systems. See the previous note for two suggested solutions for rendering superscript ⟨ŋ⟩ in braille.) The other diacritics are as follows; any of these may be modified by a change in placement:

⠐ (braille pattern dots-5)	⠐ (braille pattern dots-5) ⠄ (braille pattern dots-3)	⠠ (braille pattern dots-6) ⠫ (braille pattern dots-1246)	⠈ (braille pattern dots-4) ⠫ (braille pattern dots-1246)	⠠ (braille pattern dots-6) ⠦ (braille pattern dots-236)	⠈ (braille pattern dots-4) ⠦ (braille pattern dots-236)	⠠ (braille pattern dots-6) ⠒ (braille pattern dots-25)	⠈ (braille pattern dots-4) ⠒ (braille pattern dots-25)	⠠ (braille pattern dots-6) ⠻ (braille pattern dots-12456)	⠐ (braille pattern dots-5) ⠻ (braille pattern dots-12456)	⠈ (braille pattern dots-4) ⠻ (braille pattern dots-12456)
⠐	⠐ ⠄	⠠ ⠫	⠈ ⠫	⠠ ⠦	⠈ ⠦	⠠ ⠒	⠈ ⠒	⠠ ⠻	⠐ ⠻	⠈ ⠻
◌͡◌	◌ʼ	◌̥	◌̊	◌̬	◌̌	◌̤	◌̈	◌̰	◌̴	◌̃

⠠ (braille pattern dots-6) ⠯ (braille pattern dots-12346)	⠠ (braille pattern dots-6) ⠹ (braille pattern dots-1456)	⠠ (braille pattern dots-6) ⠖ (braille pattern dots-235) ⠹ (braille pattern dots-1456)	⠠ (braille pattern dots-6) ⠶ (braille pattern dots-2356)	⠠ (braille pattern dots-6) ⠕ (braille pattern dots-135)	⠠ (braille pattern dots-6) ⠪ (braille pattern dots-246)	⠠ (braille pattern dots-6) ⠬ (braille pattern dots-346)	⠠ (braille pattern dots-6) ⠤ (braille pattern dots-36)	⠈ (braille pattern dots-4) ⠉ (braille pattern dots-14)
⠠ ⠯	⠠ ⠹	⠠ ⠖ ⠹	⠠ ⠶	⠠ ⠕	⠠ ⠪	⠠ ⠬	⠠ ⠤	⠈ ⠉
◌̼	◌̪	◌̺	◌̻	◌̹	◌̜	◌̟	◌̠	◌̄

⠈ (braille pattern dots-4) ⠭ (braille pattern dots-1346)	⠠ (braille pattern dots-6) ⠎ (braille pattern dots-234)	⠠ (braille pattern dots-6) ⠱ (braille pattern dots-156)	⠠ (braille pattern dots-6) ⠣ (braille pattern dots-126)	⠠ (braille pattern dots-6) ⠜ (braille pattern dots-345)	⠐ (braille pattern dots-5) ⠗ (braille pattern dots-1235)	⠈ (braille pattern dots-4) ⠙ (braille pattern dots-145)	⠠ (braille pattern dots-6) ⠆ (braille pattern dots-23)	⠠ (braille pattern dots-6) ⠾ (braille pattern dots-23456)	⠈ (braille pattern dots-4) ⠷ (braille pattern dots-12356)
⠈ ⠭	⠠ ⠎	⠠ ⠱	⠠ ⠣	⠠ ⠜	⠐ ⠗	⠈ ⠙	⠠ ⠆	⠠ ⠾	⠈ ⠷
◌̽	◌̙	◌̘	◌̞	◌̝	◌˞	◌̚	◌̩	◌̯	◌̆

⠈ (braille pattern dots-4) ⠉ (braille pattern dots-14)	⠈ (braille pattern dots-4) ⠌ (braille pattern dots-34)	⠈ (braille pattern dots-4) ⠡ (braille pattern dots-16)	⠈ (braille pattern dots-4) ⠠ (braille pattern dots-6) ⠌ (braille pattern dots-34)	⠈ (braille pattern dots-4) ⠠ (braille pattern dots-6) ⠡ (braille pattern dots-16)
⠈ ⠉	⠈ ⠌	⠈ ⠡	⠈ ⠠ ⠌	⠈ ⠠ ⠡
◌̄	◌́	◌̀	◌̋	◌̏

⠈ (braille pattern dots-4) ⠦ (braille pattern dots-236)	⠈ (braille pattern dots-4) ⠩ (braille pattern dots-146)	⠈ (braille pattern dots-4) ⠊ (braille pattern dots-24)	⠈ (braille pattern dots-4) ⠔ (braille pattern dots-35)	⠈ (braille pattern dots-4) ⠢ (braille pattern dots-26)	⠈ (braille pattern dots-4) ⠑ (braille pattern dots-15)	⠈ (braille pattern dots-4) ⠲ (braille pattern dots-256)
⠈ ⠦	⠈ ⠩	⠈ ⠊	⠈ ⠔	⠈ ⠢	⠈ ⠑	⠈ ⠲
◌̌	◌̂	◌᷄	◌᷅	◌᷆	◌᷇	◌᷈

The high and low falling-tone diacritics are extrapolated from the rising-tone diacritics, the dipping tone by analogy with the peaking tone and the generic rising and falling tones.

== Non-combining modifiers ==
⠸ marks tone letters, stress, and prosody.

⠸ (braille pattern dots-456) ⠃ (braille pattern dots-12)	⠸ (braille pattern dots-456) ⠆ (braille pattern dots-23)	⠸ (braille pattern dots-456) ⠳ (braille pattern dots-1256)	⠸ (braille pattern dots-456) ⠿ (braille pattern dots-123456)	⠸ (braille pattern dots-456) ⠇ (braille pattern dots-123)
⠸ ⠃	⠸ ⠆	⠸ ⠳	⠸ ⠿	⠸ ⠇
ˈ◌	ˌ◌	|	‖	◌‿◌

⠸ (braille pattern dots-456) ⠮ (braille pattern dots-2346)	⠸ (braille pattern dots-456) ⠫ (braille pattern dots-1246)	⠸ (braille pattern dots-456) ⠙ (braille pattern dots-145)	⠸ (braille pattern dots-456) ⠴ (braille pattern dots-356)
⠸ ⠮	⠸ ⠫	⠸ ⠙	⠸ ⠴
ꜜ	ꜛ	↗	↘

⠸ (braille pattern dots-456) ⠈ (braille pattern dots-4) ⠉ (braille pattern dots-14)	⠸ (braille pattern dots-456) ⠉ (braille pattern dots-14)	⠸ (braille pattern dots-456) ⠒ (braille pattern dots-25)	⠸ (braille pattern dots-456) ⠤ (braille pattern dots-36)	⠸ (braille pattern dots-456) ⠠ (braille pattern dots-6) ⠤ (braille pattern dots-36)
⠸ ⠈ ⠉	⠸ ⠉	⠸ ⠒	⠸ ⠤	⠸ ⠠ ⠤
˥	˦	˧	˨	˩

⠸ (braille pattern dots-456) ⠌ (braille pattern dots-34)	⠸ (braille pattern dots-456) ⠡ (braille pattern dots-16)	⠸ (braille pattern dots-456) ⠊ (braille pattern dots-24)	⠸ (braille pattern dots-456) ⠔ (braille pattern dots-35)	⠸ (braille pattern dots-456) ⠑ (braille pattern dots-15)	⠸ (braille pattern dots-456) ⠢ (braille pattern dots-26)	⠸ (braille pattern dots-456) ⠲ (braille pattern dots-256)
⠸ ⠌	⠸ ⠡	⠸ ⠊	⠸ ⠔	⠸ ⠑	⠸ ⠢	⠸ ⠲
˩˥	˥˩	˧˥	˩˧	˥˧	˧˩	˨˦˨

There is no general provision for IPA tone letters. Ligatures which did not happen to have been chosen as illustrations in the 2005 edition of the IPA summary chart, such as the Mandarin dipping tone ⟨˨˩˦⟩ and various other tones used in the IPA Handbook, are not covered. The high and low falling tone letters above are extrapolated from the high and low rising tone letters. ⠸⠲ transcribes peaking (rising–falling) tones in general, and so has no exact print equivalent; the parallel dipping tone may be expected from the patterns elsewhere. There is no explicit provision for use of the ligature mark to create additional tone letters, nor whether the tone-marker ⠸ would need to be repeated for each component.

== Punctuation and code switching ==
The only punctuation which is defined is the period (syllable break, full stop), comma (pause), hyphen (morpheme break), and rightward arrow (phonological realization).

⠄ (braille pattern dots-3)	⠂ (braille pattern dots-2)	⠤ (braille pattern dots-36)	⠸ (braille pattern dots-456) ⠕ (braille pattern dots-135)
⠄	⠂	⠤	⠸ ⠕
.	,	-	→

For all other punctuation, you must opt out of IPA coding.

The primary indication of IPA coding are the brackets, square or slash depending on whether the transcription is phonetic or phonemic. These are marked by ⠘:

⠘ (braille pattern dots-45) ⠌ (braille pattern dots-34)	⠘ (braille pattern dots-45) ⠷ (braille pattern dots-12356)	⠘ (braille pattern dots-45) ⠾ (braille pattern dots-23456)
⠘ ⠌	⠘ ⠷	⠘ ⠾
/	[	]

⠰ opts out of IPA. A single instance indicates that the following cell is to be read in the national orthography. Doubled, ⠰⠰, it indicates that the following string is to be read in orthography, up to the opt-in indicator ⠰⠆, which marks the end of the non-IPA passage. These are only used for non-IPA (or nonstandard IPA) strings within IPA brackets. An example is the use of parentheses to mark an optional consonant or vowel, since parentheses are not defined for IPA Braille.

⠰ (braille pattern dots-56)	⠰ (braille pattern dots-56)	⠰ (braille pattern dots-56) ⠆ (braille pattern dots-23)
⠰	⠰ ⠰	⠰ ⠆
(not IPA)	(start non-IPA)	(end non-IPA)

== Notes ==
Place →	Labial					Coronal										Dorsal					Laryngeal			
Manner ↓	Bilabial		Labiodental		Linguolabial		Dental		Alveolar		Postalveolar		Retroflex		(Alveolo-)palatal		Velar		Uvular		Pharyngeal/epiglottal		Glottal	
Nasal	m̥	m	ɱ̊	ɱ		n̼	n̪̊	n̪	n̥	n	n̠̊	n̠	ɳ̊	ɳ	ɲ̊	ɲ	ŋ̊	ŋ	ɴ̥	ɴ				
Plosive	p	b	p̪	b̪	t̼	d̼	t̪	d̪	t	d			ʈ	ɖ	c	ɟ	k	ɡ	q	ɢ	ʡ		ʔ	
Sibilant affricate							t̪s̪	d̪z̪	ts	dz	t̠ʃ	d̠ʒ	tʂ	dʐ	tɕ	dʑ								
Non-sibilant affricate	pɸ	bβ	p̪f	b̪v			t̪θ	d̪ð	tɹ̝̊	dɹ̝	t̠ɹ̠̊˔	d̠ɹ̠˔			cç	ɟʝ	kx	ɡɣ	qχ	ɢʁ	ʡʜ	ʡʢ	ʔh	
Sibilant fricative							s̪	z̪	s	z	ʃ	ʒ	ʂ	ʐ	ɕ	ʑ								
Non-sibilant fricative	ɸ	β	f	v	θ̼	ð̼	θ	ð	θ̠	ð̠	ɹ̠̊˔	ɹ̠˔	ɻ̊˔	ɻ˔	ç	ʝ	x	ɣ	χ	ʁ	ħ	ʕ	h	ɦ
Approximant		β̞		ʋ				ð̞		ɹ		ɹ̠		ɻ		j		ɰ						˷
Tap/flap		ⱱ̟		ⱱ					ɾ̥	ɾ			ɽ̊	ɽ						ɢ̆		ʡ̮		
Trill	ʙ̥	ʙ							r̥	r		r̠	ɽ̊r̥	ɽr					ʀ̥	ʀ	ʜ	ʢ		
Lateral affricate									tɬ	dɮ			tꞎ	d𝼅	c𝼆	ɟʎ̝	k𝼄	ɡʟ̝						
Lateral fricative							ɬ̪		ɬ	ɮ			ꞎ	𝼅	𝼆	ʎ̝	𝼄	ʟ̝						
Lateral approximant								l̪	l̥	l		l̠	ɭ̊	ɭ	ʎ̥	ʎ	ʟ̥	ʟ		ʟ̠				
Lateral tap/flap									ɺ̥	ɺ			𝼈̊	𝼈		ʎ̮		ʟ̆						

		BL	LD	D	A	PA	RF	P	V	U
Implosive	Voiced	ɓ			ɗ		ᶑ	ʄ	ɠ	ʛ
Implosive	Voiceless	ɓ̥			ɗ̥		ᶑ̊	ʄ̊	ɠ̊	ʛ̥
Ejective	Stop	pʼ			tʼ		ʈʼ	cʼ	kʼ	qʼ
Ejective	Affricate		p̪fʼ	t̪θʼ	tsʼ	t̠ʃʼ	tʂʼ	tɕʼ	kxʼ	qχʼ
Ejective	Fricative	ɸʼ	fʼ	θʼ	sʼ	ʃʼ	ʂʼ	ɕʼ	xʼ	χʼ
Ejective	Lateral affricate				tɬʼ			c𝼆ʼ	k𝼄ʼ	q𝼄ʼ
Ejective	Lateral fricative				ɬʼ					
Click (top: velar; bottom: uvular)	Tenuis	kʘ qʘ		kǀ qǀ	kǃ qǃ		k𝼊 q𝼊	kǂ qǂ		
Click (top: velar; bottom: uvular)	Voiced	ɡʘ ɢʘ		ɡǀ ɢǀ	ɡǃ ɢǃ		ɡ𝼊 ɢ𝼊	ɡǂ ɢǂ		
Click (top: velar; bottom: uvular)	Nasal	ŋʘ ɴʘ		ŋǀ ɴǀ	ŋǃ ɴǃ		ŋ𝼊 ɴ𝼊	ŋǂ ɴǂ	ʞ	
Click (top: velar; bottom: uvular)	Tenuis lateral				kǁ qǁ					
Click (top: velar; bottom: uvular)	Voiced lateral				ɡǁ ɢǁ					
Click (top: velar; bottom: uvular)	Nasal lateral				ŋǁ ɴǁ					
