= Braille pattern dots-2 =

Braille pattern

6-dot braille cells
⠀	⠁	⠃	⠉	⠙	⠑	⠋	⠛	⠓	⠊	⠚	⠈	⠘
⠄	⠅	⠇	⠍	⠝	⠕	⠏	⠟	⠗	⠎	⠞	⠌	⠜
⠤	⠥	⠧	⠭	⠽	⠵	⠯	⠿	⠷	⠮	⠾	⠬	⠼
⠠	⠡	⠣	⠩	⠹	⠱	⠫	⠻	⠳	⠪	⠺	⠨	⠸
shift down	⠂	⠆	⠒	⠲	⠢	⠖	⠶	⠦	⠔	⠴	⠐	⠰

The Braille pattern dots-2 ( ⠂ ) is a 6-dot braille cell with the middle-left dot raised, or an 8-dot braille cell with its mid-high left dot raised. It is represented by the Unicode code point U+2802, and in Braille ASCII with the number "1".

Character information
Preview	⠂ (braille pattern dots-2)	
Unicode name	BRAILLE PATTERN DOTS-2	
Encodings	decimal	hex
Unicode	10242	U+2802
UTF-8	226 160 130	E2 A0 82
Numeric character reference	&#10242;	&#x2802;
Braille ASCII		

== Unified Braille ==
In unified international braille, the braille pattern dots-2 is used to represent a comma or other non-letter symbol or semi-letter.

=== Table of unified braille values ===
Italian Braille	, (comma)
French Braille	, (comma), an
English Braille	, (comma) / -ea-
German Braille	, (comma)
Bharati Braille	Avagraha ऽ / ઽ / ঽ / ଽ / ఽ
IPA Braille	, (comma)
Russian Braille	, (comma)
Slovak Braille	, (comma)
Arabic Braille	ـَ fatha
Irish Braille	, (comma) / -ea-
Thai Braille	ๆ (reduplication mark)

== Other braille ==
Japanese Braille	sokuon / っ / ッ
Korean Braille	r- / ㄹ-
Mainland Chinese Braille	tone 2
Taiwanese Braille	tone 2
Two-Cell Chinese Braille	们 men (suffix)
Nemeth Braille	not an independent sign

== Plus dots 7 and 8 ==
Related to Braille pattern dots-2 are Braille patterns 27, 28, and 278, which are used in 8-dot braille systems, such as Gardner-Salinas and Luxembourgish Braille.

Character information
Preview	⡂ (braille pattern dots-27)		⢂ (braille pattern dots-28)		⣂ (braille pattern dots-278)	
Unicode name	BRAILLE PATTERN DOTS-27		BRAILLE PATTERN DOTS-28		BRAILLE PATTERN DOTS-278	
Encodings	decimal	hex	dec	hex	dec	hex
Unicode	10306	U+2842	10370	U+2882	10434	U+28C2
UTF-8	226 161 130	E2 A1 82	226 162 130	E2 A2 82	226 163 130	E2 A3 82
Numeric character reference	&#10306;	&#x2842;	&#10370;	&#x2882;	&#10434;	&#x28C2;

	dots 27	dots 28	dots 278
Gardner Salinas Braille	end array element	_ (underscore)	× (multiplication sign)

== Related 8-dot kantenji patterns ==
In the Japanese kantenji braille, the standard 8-dot Braille patterns 3, 13, 34, and 134 are the patterns related to Braille pattern dots-2, since the two additional dots of kantenji patterns 02, 27, and 027 are placed above the base 6-dot cell, instead of below, as in standard 8-dot braille.

Character information
Preview	⠄ (braille pattern dots-3)		⠅ (braille pattern dots-13)		⠌ (braille pattern dots-34)		⠍ (braille pattern dots-134)	
Unicode name	BRAILLE PATTERN DOTS-3		BRAILLE PATTERN DOTS-13		BRAILLE PATTERN DOTS-34		BRAILLE PATTERN DOTS-134	
Encodings	decimal	hex	dec	hex	dec	hex	dec	hex
Unicode	10244	U+2804	10245	U+2805	10252	U+280C	10253	U+280D
UTF-8	226 160 132	E2 A0 84	226 160 133	E2 A0 85	226 160 140	E2 A0 8C	226 160 141	E2 A0 8D
Numeric character reference	&#10244;	&#x2804;	&#10245;	&#x2805;	&#10252;	&#x280C;	&#10253;	&#x280D;

=== Kantenji using braille patterns 3, 13, 34, or 134 ===
This listing includes kantenji using Braille pattern dots-2 for all 6349 kanji found in JIS C 6226-1978.

- - N/A - used only as a selector

==== Selector 2 ====
- - い/糹/#2 + selector 2 = 丼
- - 龸 + selector 2 = 光
  - - る/忄 + 龸 + selector 2 = 恍
  - - 日 + 龸 + selector 2 = 晃
  - - に/氵 + 龸 + selector 2 = 洸
  - - 氷/氵 + 龸 + selector 2 = 滉
  - - い/糹/#2 + 龸 + selector 2 = 絖
  - - ⺼ + 龸 + selector 2 = 胱
- - も/門 + selector 2 = 包
  - - も/門 + selector 2 + selector 2 = 勹
  - - け/犬 + も/門 + selector 2 = 匏
  - - れ/口 + も/門 + selector 2 = 咆
  - - つ/土 + も/門 + selector 2 = 垉
  - - よ/广 + も/門 + selector 2 = 庖
  - - き/木 + も/門 + selector 2 = 枹
  - - 火 + も/門 + selector 2 = 炮
  - - や/疒 + も/門 + selector 2 = 疱
  - - ひ/辶 + も/門 + selector 2 = 皰
  - - く/艹 + も/門 + selector 2 = 苞
  - - む/車 + も/門 + selector 2 = 蚫
  - - ね/示 + も/門 + selector 2 = 袍
  - - か/金 + も/門 + selector 2 = 鉋
  - - め/目 + も/門 + selector 2 = 靤
  - - と/戸 + も/門 + selector 2 = 鞄
  - - せ/食 + も/門 + selector 2 = 鮑
  - - す/発 + も/門 + selector 2 = 麭
- - へ/⺩ + selector 2 = 将
  - - へ/⺩ + selector 2 + selector 2 = 爿
    - - へ/⺩ + へ/⺩ + selector 2 = 將
  - - に/氵 + へ/⺩ + selector 2 = 漿
  - - 心 + へ/⺩ + selector 2 = 蒋
  - - せ/食 + へ/⺩ + selector 2 = 醤
  - - か/金 + へ/⺩ + selector 2 = 鏘
- - 囗 + selector 2 = 式
  - - む/車 + 囗 + selector 2 = 軾
  - - selector 2 + 囗 = 戎
- - は/辶 + selector 2 = 支
  - - み/耳 + は/辶 + selector 2 = 跂
  - - は/辶 + む/車 + selector 2 = 翅
- - ほ/方 + selector 2 = 死
  - - ほ/方 + selector 2 + selector 2 = 歹
  - - 氷/氵 + ほ/方 + selector 2 = 斃
  - - く/艹 + ほ/方 + selector 2 = 薨
- - 氷/氵 + selector 2 = 汰
- - や/疒 + selector 2 = 矢
  - - ち/竹 + や/疒 + selector 2 = 笶
  - - く/艹 + や/疒 + selector 2 = 薙
- - す/発 + selector 2 = 罪
  - - す/発 + selector 2 + selector 2 = 网
- - そ/馬 + selector 2 = 羊
  - - な/亻 + そ/馬 + selector 2 = 佯
  - - む/車 + そ/馬 + selector 2 = 恙
- - 囗 + そ/馬 + selector 2 = 觧
  - - そ/馬 + む/車 + selector 2 = 翔
- - む/車 + selector 2 = 羽
  - - ぬ/力 + む/車 + selector 2 = 勠
  - - よ/广 + む/車 + selector 2 = 廖
  - - て/扌 + む/車 + selector 2 = 挧
  - - き/木 + む/車 + selector 2 = 榻
  - - い/糹/#2 + む/車 + selector 2 = 繆
  - - ま/石 + む/車 + selector 2 = 翊
  - - り/分 + む/車 + selector 2 = 翕
  - - 火 + む/車 + selector 2 = 翡
  - - へ/⺩ + む/車 + selector 2 = 翩
  - - も/門 + む/車 + selector 2 = 翳
  - - つ/土 + む/車 + selector 2 = 翹
  - - 心 + む/車 + selector 2 = 蓼
  - - え/訁 + む/車 + selector 2 = 謬
  - - せ/食 + む/車 + selector 2 = 醪
  - - か/金 + む/車 + selector 2 = 鏐
- - と/戸 + selector 2 = 老
  - - れ/口 + と/戸 + selector 2 = 咾
  - - 心 + と/戸 + selector 2 = 蓍
  - - む/車 + と/戸 + selector 2 = 蛯
- - selector 2 + と/戸 = 卜
- - ⺼ + selector 2 = 臍
- - 心 + selector 2 = 菊
  - - て/扌 + 心 + selector 2 = 掬
  - - 心 + 心 + selector 2 = 椈
  - - と/戸 + 心 + selector 2 = 鞠
- - み/耳 + selector 2 = 足
  - - て/扌 + み/耳 + selector 2 = 捉
  - - う/宀/#3 + み/耳 + selector 2 = 蹇
  - - ん/止 + み/耳 + selector 2 = 齪
- - せ/食 + selector 2 = 魚
- - ろ/十 + selector 2 = 鹵
- - selector 2 + の/禾 = 乏
  - - に/氵 + selector 2 + の/禾 = 泛
- - を/貝 + selector 2 + の/禾 = 貶
- - selector 2 + ひ/辶 = 匕
- - selector 2 + さ/阝 = 卵
  - - う/宀/#3 + selector 2 + さ/阝 = 孵
- - selector 2 + む/車 = 厶
- - selector 2 + け/犬 = 太
- - selector 2 + う/宀/#3 = 孚
  - - き/木 + selector 2 + う/宀/#3 = 桴
- - selector 2 + き/木 = 巳
  - - 火 + selector 2 + き/木 = 煕
- - selector 2 + ゆ/彳 = 罔
- - selector 2 + そ/馬 = 遂
  - - 火 + selector 2 + そ/馬 = 燧
  - - さ/阝 + selector 2 + そ/馬 = 隧
- - ち/竹 + selector 2 + む/車 = 簒
- - selector 2 + 宿 + 宿 = 丿
- - に/氵 + ん/止 + selector 2 = 滷
- - selector 2 + い/糹/#2 = 韋
