= Braille pattern dots-2346 =

Braille pattern

6-dot braille cells
⠀	⠁	⠃	⠉	⠙	⠑	⠋	⠛	⠓	⠊	⠚	⠈	⠘
⠄	⠅	⠇	⠍	⠝	⠕	⠏	⠟	⠗	⠎	⠞	⠌	⠜
⠤	⠥	⠧	⠭	⠽	⠵	⠯	⠿	⠷	⠮	⠾	⠬	⠼
⠠	⠡	⠣	⠩	⠹	⠱	⠫	⠻	⠳	⠪	⠺	⠨	⠸
shift down	⠂	⠆	⠒	⠲	⠢	⠖	⠶	⠦	⠔	⠴	⠐	⠰

The Braille pattern dots-2346 ( ⠮ ) is a 6-dot braille cell with the top right, middle left, and both bottom dots raised, or an 8-dot braille cell with the top right, upper-middle left, and both lower-middle dots raised. It is represented by the Unicode code point U+282e, and in Braille ASCII with an exclamation mark: !.

Character information
Preview	⠮ (braille pattern dots-2346)	
Unicode name	BRAILLE PATTERN DOTS-2346	
Encodings	decimal	hex
Unicode	10286	U+282E
UTF-8	226 160 174	E2 A0 AE
Numeric character reference	&#10286;	&#x282E;
Braille ASCII	33	21

== Unified Braille ==
In unified international braille, the braille pattern dots-2346 is used to represent a voiced alveolar fricative or aspirate, such as /ð/ or /dʱ/, and is otherwise assigned as needed.

=== Table of unified braille values ===
French Braille	È, ss, "sans"
English Braille	the
German Braille	ß / ss
Bharati Braille	ध / ਧ / ધ / ধ / ଧ / ధ / ಧ / ധ / ධ / دھ
IPA Braille	/ʒ/
Russian Braille	Ы
Slovak Braille	Ž
Arabic Braille	ذ
Persian Braille	ذ
Thai Braille	ซ s

== Other braille ==
Japanese Braille	ho / ほ / ホ
Korean Braille	eul / 을
Mainland Chinese Braille	ei
Taiwanese Braille	e / ㄜ
Two-Cell Chinese Braille	tu- -ě/-ǒ, 也 yě
Nemeth Braille	∫ (integral)
Algerian Braille	ى

== Plus dots 7 and 8 ==
Related to Braille pattern dots-2346 are Braille patterns 23467, 23468, and 234678, which are used in 8-dot braille systems, such as Gardner-Salinas and Luxembourgish Braille.

Character information
Preview	⡮ (braille pattern dots-23467)		⢮ (braille pattern dots-23468)		⣮ (braille pattern dots-234678)	
Unicode name	BRAILLE PATTERN DOTS-23467		BRAILLE PATTERN DOTS-23468		BRAILLE PATTERN DOTS-234678	
Encodings	decimal	hex	dec	hex	dec	hex
Unicode	10350	U+286E	10414	U+28AE	10478	U+28EE
UTF-8	226 161 174	E2 A1 AE	226 162 174	E2 A2 AE	226 163 174	E2 A3 AE
Numeric character reference	&#10350;	&#x286E;	&#10414;	&#x28AE;	&#10478;	&#x28EE;

	dots 23467	dots 23468	dots 234678
Gardner Salinas Braille	line ∫	close ∫	∫

== Related 8-dot kantenji patterns ==
In the Japanese kantenji braille, the standard 8-dot Braille patterns 3578, 13578, 34578, and 134578 are the patterns related to Braille pattern dots-2346, since the two additional dots of kantenji patterns 02346, 23467, and 023467 are placed above the base 6-dot cell, instead of below, as in standard 8-dot braille.

Character information
Preview	⣔ (braille pattern dots-3578)		⣕ (braille pattern dots-13578)		⣜ (braille pattern dots-34578)		⣝ (braille pattern dots-134578)	
Unicode name	BRAILLE PATTERN DOTS-3578		BRAILLE PATTERN DOTS-13578		BRAILLE PATTERN DOTS-34578		BRAILLE PATTERN DOTS-134578	
Encodings	decimal	hex	dec	hex	dec	hex	dec	hex
Unicode	10452	U+28D4	10453	U+28D5	10460	U+28DC	10461	U+28DD
UTF-8	226 163 148	E2 A3 94	226 163 149	E2 A3 95	226 163 156	E2 A3 9C	226 163 157	E2 A3 9D
Numeric character reference	&#10452;	&#x28D4;	&#10453;	&#x28D5;	&#10460;	&#x28DC;	&#10461;	&#x28DD;

=== Kantenji using braille patterns 3578, 13578, 34578, or 134578 ===
This listing includes kantenji using Braille pattern dots-2346 for all 6349 kanji found in JIS C 6226-1978.

- - 方

==== Variants and thematic compounds ====
- - selector 3 + ほ/方 = 敖
- - selector 4 + ほ/方 = 旁
- - selector 5 + ほ/方 = 亡
- - selector 6 + ほ/方 = 甫
- - ほ/方 + selector 1 = 夕
- - ほ/方 + selector 2 = 死
  - - ほ/方 + selector 2 + selector 2 = 歹
- - ほ/方 + そ/馬 = 少

==== Compounds of 方 ====
- - つ/土 + ほ/方 = 坊
- - ふ/女 + ほ/方 = 妨
- - と/戸 + ほ/方 = 房
- - い/糹/#2 + ほ/方 = 紡
- - ⺼ + ほ/方 = 肪
- - く/艹 + ほ/方 = 芳
  - - く/艹 + ほ/方 + や/疒 = 蔟
  - - か/金 + く/艹 + ほ/方 = 錺
  - - せ/食 + く/艹 + ほ/方 = 餝
- - え/訁 + ほ/方 = 訪
- - さ/阝 + ほ/方 = 防
- - ほ/方 + 氷/氵 = 放
  - - 仁/亻 + ほ/方 = 倣
- - ほ/方 + 龸 = 於
  - - れ/口 + ほ/方 + 龸 = 唹
  - - に/氵 + ほ/方 + 龸 = 淤
  - - も/門 + ほ/方 + 龸 = 閼
  - - せ/食 + ほ/方 + 龸 = 鯲
- - ほ/方 + ち/竹 = 施
  - - 心 + ほ/方 + ち/竹 = 葹
- - ほ/方 + ゆ/彳 = 旅
  - - ⺼ + ほ/方 + ゆ/彳 = 膂
- - ほ/方 + し/巿 = 旆
- - ほ/方 + よ/广 = 旋
- - ほ/方 + や/疒 = 族
  - - れ/口 + ほ/方 + や/疒 = 嗾
  - - ち/竹 + ほ/方 + や/疒 = 簇
  - - か/金 + ほ/方 + や/疒 = 鏃
- - ほ/方 + き/木 = 旗
  - - ち/竹 + ほ/方 + き/木 = 籏
- - 囗 + 龸 + ほ/方 = 圀
- - ゆ/彳 + 宿 + ほ/方 = 彷
- - ほ/方 + ふ/女 + selector 4 = 旃
- - ほ/方 + selector 4 + せ/食 = 旄
- - ほ/方 + せ/食 + い/糹/#2 = 旌
- - ほ/方 + 宿 + く/艹 = 旒
- - ほ/方 + 宿 + の/禾 = 旙
- - ほ/方 + の/禾 + た/⽥ = 旛
- - 心 + 宿 + ほ/方 = 枋
- - ふ/女 + 宿 + ほ/方 = 舫
- - と/戸 + 宿 + ほ/方 = 髣
- - せ/食 + 宿 + ほ/方 = 魴

==== Compounds of 敖 ====
- - 火 + selector 3 + ほ/方 = 熬
- - む/車 + selector 3 + ほ/方 = 螯
- - ひ/辶 + selector 3 + ほ/方 = 遨
- - せ/食 + selector 3 + ほ/方 = 鰲
- - な/亻 + 宿 + ほ/方 = 傲
- - れ/口 + 宿 + ほ/方 = 嗷
- - ほ/方 + 比 + め/目 = 鼇

==== Compounds of 旁 ====
- - な/亻 + ほ/方 = 傍
- - ゑ/訁 + ほ/方 = 謗
- - 心 + selector 4 + ほ/方 = 蒡
- - き/木 + 宿 + ほ/方 = 榜
- - に/氵 + 宿 + ほ/方 = 滂
- - ま/石 + 宿 + ほ/方 = 磅
- - ⺼ + 宿 + ほ/方 = 膀

==== Compounds of 亡 ====
- - る/忄 + ほ/方 = 忙
- - め/目 + ほ/方 = 盲
- - ほ/方 + 心 = 忘
- - ほ/方 + ら/月 = 望
- - ほ/方 + ふ/女 = 妄
  - - 仁/亻 + ほ/方 + ふ/女 = 侫
- - る/忄 + selector 5 + ほ/方 = 惘
- - に/氵 + selector 5 + ほ/方 = 瀛
- - ⺼ + selector 5 + ほ/方 = 肓
- - 心 + selector 5 + ほ/方 = 芒
  - - か/金 + selector 5 + ほ/方 = 鋩
- - く/艹 + selector 5 + ほ/方 = 茫
- - む/車 + selector 5 + ほ/方 = 虻
- - ほ/方 + み/耳 + ん/止 = 氓

==== Compounds of 甫 ====
- - も/門 + ほ/方 = 匍
- - れ/口 + ほ/方 = 哺
- - て/扌 + ほ/方 = 捕
- - に/氵 + ほ/方 = 浦
  - - 心 + に/氵 + ほ/方 = 蒲
- - り/分 + ほ/方 = 舗
  - - り/分 + り/分 + ほ/方 = 舖
- - ね/示 + ほ/方 = 補
- - ⺼ + selector 6 + ほ/方 = 脯
- - ひ/辶 + selector 6 + ほ/方 = 逋
- - せ/食 + selector 6 + ほ/方 = 鯆
- - 囗 + 宿 + ほ/方 = 圃
- - つ/土 + 宿 + ほ/方 = 埔
- - 心 + 龸 + ほ/方 = 葡
- - む/車 + 宿 + ほ/方 = 輔
- - か/金 + 宿 + ほ/方 = 鋪
- - せ/食 + 龸 + ほ/方 = 餔
- - し/巿 + 宿 + ほ/方 = 黼

==== Compounds of 夕 ====
- - ほ/方 + ほ/方 = 多
  - - た/⽥ + ほ/方 = 夥
  - - selector 1 + ほ/方 + ほ/方 = 夛
  - - な/亻 + ほ/方 + ほ/方 = 侈
- - 龸 + ほ/方 = 夢
  - - な/亻 + 龸 + ほ/方 = 儚
- - 火 + ほ/方 = 炙
- - の/禾 + ほ/方 = 移
- - ほ/方 + れ/口 = 名
  - - 心 + ほ/方 + れ/口 = 茗
  - - せ/食 + ほ/方 + れ/口 = 酩
- - ほ/方 + と/戸 = 外
  - - ひ/辶 + ほ/方 + と/戸 = 迯
- - む/車 + ほ/方 = 舞
- - さ/阝 + ほ/方 + selector 1 = 夘
- - に/氵 + ほ/方 + selector 1 = 汐
- - ほ/方 + き/木 + き/木 = 梦
- - ほ/方 + selector 5 + い/糹/#2 = 舛

==== Compounds of 死 and 歹 ====
- - 宿 + ほ/方 = 夙
- - ほ/方 + ぬ/力 = 列
  - - ほ/方 + 火 = 烈
  - - ほ/方 + ね/示 = 裂
  - - 氷/氵 + ほ/方 + ぬ/力 = 冽
  - - に/氵 + ほ/方 + ぬ/力 = 洌
- - ほ/方 + な/亻 = 殆
- - ほ/方 + か/金 = 殊
- - ほ/方 + 囗 = 残
  - - ほ/方 + ほ/方 + 囗 = 殘
- - ほ/方 + め/目 = 殖
- - ほ/方 + み/耳 = 殱
  - - ほ/方 + ほ/方 + み/耳 = 殲
- - ほ/方 + す/発 = 殉
- - 氷/氵 + ほ/方 + selector 2 = 斃
- - く/艹 + ほ/方 + selector 2 = 薨
- - ほ/方 + に/氵 + の/禾 = 歿
- - ほ/方 + 宿 + け/犬 = 殀
- - ほ/方 + け/犬 + お/頁 = 殃
- - ほ/方 + 宿 + う/宀/#3 = 殄
- - ほ/方 + 龸 + う/宀/#3 = 殍
- - ほ/方 + 宿 + ま/石 = 殕
- - ほ/方 + を/貝 + れ/口 = 殞
- - ほ/方 + 宿 + 数 = 殤
- - ほ/方 + る/忄 + selector 1 = 殪
- - ほ/方 + れ/口 + れ/口 = 殫
- - ほ/方 + う/宀/#3 + を/貝 = 殯

==== Compounds of 少 ====
- - 氷/氵 + ほ/方 = 沙
  - - ふ/女 + 氷/氵 + ほ/方 = 娑
  - - 心 + 氷/氵 + ほ/方 = 莎
  - - ね/示 + 氷/氵 + ほ/方 = 裟
  - - せ/食 + 氷/氵 + ほ/方 = 鯊
- - ほ/方 + せ/食 = 毟
- - ほ/方 + い/糹/#2 = 雀
- - も/門 + ほ/方 + そ/馬 = 尠
- - き/木 + ほ/方 + そ/馬 = 杪
- - め/目 + ほ/方 + そ/馬 = 眇
  - - に/氵 + ほ/方 + そ/馬 = 渺
  - - ゐ/幺 + ほ/方 + そ/馬 = 緲
  - - か/金 + ほ/方 + そ/馬 = 鈔
- - の/禾 + ほ/方 + そ/馬 = 穆
- - い/糹/#2 + ほ/方 + そ/馬 = 紗

==== Other compounds ====
- - 囗 + ほ/方 = 囮
- - け/犬 + ほ/方 = 奉
  - - き/木 + ほ/方 = 棒
  - - な/亻 + け/犬 + ほ/方 = 俸
  - - て/扌 + け/犬 + ほ/方 = 捧
- - 日 + ほ/方 = 曙
- - や/疒 + ほ/方 = 峰
- - か/金 + ほ/方 = 鋒
- - ほ/方 + む/車 = 蜂
- - ひ/辶 + ほ/方 = 逢
  - - 心 + ほ/方 = 蓬
  - - ゐ/幺 + ほ/方 = 縫
  - - ち/竹 + ひ/辶 + ほ/方 = 篷
- - み/耳 + ほ/方 = 聾
- - を/貝 + ほ/方 = 贅
- - ほ/方 + 日 = 屠
- - や/疒 + 宿 + ほ/方 = 峯
- - 火 + 宿 + ほ/方 = 烽
- - む/車 + け/犬 + ほ/方 = 蚌
