= Braille pattern dots-346 =

Braille pattern

6-dot braille cells
⠀	⠁	⠃	⠉	⠙	⠑	⠋	⠛	⠓	⠊	⠚	⠈	⠘
⠄	⠅	⠇	⠍	⠝	⠕	⠏	⠟	⠗	⠎	⠞	⠌	⠜
⠤	⠥	⠧	⠭	⠽	⠵	⠯	⠿	⠷	⠮	⠾	⠬	⠼
⠠	⠡	⠣	⠩	⠹	⠱	⠫	⠻	⠳	⠪	⠺	⠨	⠸
shift down	⠂	⠆	⠒	⠲	⠢	⠖	⠶	⠦	⠔	⠴	⠐	⠰

The Braille pattern dots-346 ( ⠬ ) is a 6-dot braille cell with the top right and both bottom dots raised, or an 8-dot braille cell with the top right and both lower-middle dots raised. It is represented by the Unicode code point U+282c, and in Braille ASCII with the plus sign: +.

Character information
Preview	⠬ (braille pattern dots-346)	
Unicode name	BRAILLE PATTERN DOTS-346	
Encodings	decimal	hex
Unicode	10284	U+282C
UTF-8	226 160 172	E2 A0 AC
Numeric character reference	&#10284;	&#x282C;
Braille ASCII	43	2B

== Unified Braille ==
In unified international braille, the braille pattern dots-346 is used to represent velar nasals, ie /ŋ/, and otherwise as needed.

=== Table of unified braille values ===
French Braille	(Ò), on
English Braille	-ing
German Braille	ie
Bharati Braille	ङ / ਙ / ઙ / ঙ / ଙ / ఙ / ಙ / ങ / ங / ඞ
IPA Braille	/ʌ/
Slovak Braille	Ú
Persian Braille	ژ
Irish Braille	ing
Thai Braille	ช ch

== Other braille ==
Japanese Braille	yu / ゆ / ユ
Korean Braille	yo / ㅛ
Mainland Chinese Braille	yu, -ü
Taiwanese Braille	ye, -ie / ㄧㄝ
Two-Cell Chinese Braille	du- -éi
Nemeth Braille	+ (plus sign)

== Plus dots 7 and 8 ==
Related to Braille pattern dots-346 are Braille patterns 3467, 3468, and 34678, which are used in 8-dot braille systems, such as Gardner-Salinas and Luxembourgish Braille.

Character information
Preview	⡬ (braille pattern dots-3467)		⢬ (braille pattern dots-3468)		⣬ (braille pattern dots-34678)	
Unicode name	BRAILLE PATTERN DOTS-3467		BRAILLE PATTERN DOTS-3468		BRAILLE PATTERN DOTS-34678	
Encodings	decimal	hex	dec	hex	dec	hex
Unicode	10348	U+286C	10412	U+28AC	10476	U+28EC
UTF-8	226 161 172	E2 A1 AC	226 162 172	E2 A2 AC	226 163 172	E2 A3 AC
Numeric character reference	&#10348;	&#x286C;	&#10412;	&#x28AC;	&#10476;	&#x28EC;

	dots 3467	dots 3468	dots 34678
Gardner Salinas Braille	vertical stack	superposition	horizontal combination

== Related 8-dot kantenji patterns ==
In the Japanese kantenji braille, the standard 8-dot Braille patterns 578, 1578, 4578, and 14578 are the patterns related to Braille pattern dots-346, since the two additional dots of kantenji patterns 0346, 3467, and 03467 are placed above the base 6-dot cell, instead of below, as in standard 8-dot braille.

Character information
Preview	⣐ (braille pattern dots-578)		⣑ (braille pattern dots-1578)		⣘ (braille pattern dots-4578)		⣙ (braille pattern dots-14578)	
Unicode name	BRAILLE PATTERN DOTS-578		BRAILLE PATTERN DOTS-1578		BRAILLE PATTERN DOTS-4578		BRAILLE PATTERN DOTS-14578	
Encodings	decimal	hex	dec	hex	dec	hex	dec	hex
Unicode	10448	U+28D0	10449	U+28D1	10456	U+28D8	10457	U+28D9
UTF-8	226 163 144	E2 A3 90	226 163 145	E2 A3 91	226 163 152	E2 A3 98	226 163 153	E2 A3 99
Numeric character reference	&#10448;	&#x28D0;	&#10449;	&#x28D1;	&#10456;	&#x28D8;	&#10457;	&#x28D9;

=== Kantenji using braille patterns 578, 1578, 4578, or 14578 ===
This listing includes kantenji using Braille pattern dots-346 for all 6349 kanji found in JIS C 6226-1978.

- - ゆ/彳 = 行

==== Variants and thematic compounds ====
- - selector 1 + ゆ/彳 = 憂
- - selector 2 + ゆ/彳 = 罔
- - selector 3 + ゆ/彳 = 臾
- - selector 4 + ゆ/彳 = 至
  - - selector 4 + selector 4 + ゆ/彳 = 隶
- - selector 5 + ゆ/彳 = 兪
- - selector 6 + ゆ/彳 = 弯
  - - selector 6 + selector 6 + ゆ/彳 = 彎
- - ゆ/彳 + selector 1 = 弓
  - - selector 1 + ゆ/彳 + selector 1 = 弖
- - ゆ/彳 + selector 3 = 彳
- - ゆ/彳 + selector 4 = 引
- - ゆ/彳 + selector 5 = 弔

==== Compounds of 行 ====
- - ゆ/彳 + き/木 = 桁
- - ゆ/彳 + に/氵 = 術
- - ゆ/彳 + つ/土 = 街
- - ゆ/彳 + え/訁 = 衛
  - - ゆ/彳 + ゆ/彳 + え/訁 = 衞
- - ゆ/彳 + り/分 = 衝
- - ゆ/彳 + せ/食 = 衡
- - れ/口 + 宿 + ゆ/彳 = 哘
- - つ/土 + 宿 + ゆ/彳 = 垳
- - る/忄 + 宿 + ゆ/彳 = 愆
- - い/糹/#2 + 宿 + ゆ/彳 = 絎
- - ゆ/彳 + 宿 + ゆ/彳 = 衍
- - ゆ/彳 + 龸 + ゐ/幺 = 衒
- - ゆ/彳 + ら/月 + れ/口 = 衙
- - ゆ/彳 + 宿 + い/糹/#2 = 衢
- - ね/示 + 宿 + ゆ/彳 = 裄
- - か/金 + 龸 + ゆ/彳 = 銜
- - ゆ/彳 + う/宀/#3 + せ/食 = 鵆

==== Compounds of 憂 ====
- - 比 + ゆ/彳 = 優
- - て/扌 + selector 1 + ゆ/彳 = 擾

==== Compounds of 罔 ====
- - ゐ/幺 + ゆ/彳 = 網

==== Compounds of 臾 ====
- - ゑ/訁 + ゆ/彳 = 諛
- - ⺼ + selector 3 + ゆ/彳 = 腴
- - 心 + 宿 + ゆ/彳 = 萸

==== Compounds of 至 and 隶 ====
- - ゆ/彳 + ぬ/力 = 到
  - - な/亻 + ゆ/彳 = 倒
  - - き/木 + ゆ/彳 + ぬ/力 = 椡
- - う/宀/#3 + ゆ/彳 = 室
  - - 心 + う/宀/#3 + ゆ/彳 = 榁
  - - ⺼ + う/宀/#3 + ゆ/彳 = 腟
- - と/戸 + ゆ/彳 = 屋
  - - て/扌 + ゆ/彳 = 握
  - - し/巿 + と/戸 + ゆ/彳 = 幄
  - - に/氵 + と/戸 + ゆ/彳 = 渥
  - - ん/止 + と/戸 + ゆ/彳 = 齷
- - 宿 + ゆ/彳 = 窒
  - - ⺼ + 宿 + ゆ/彳 = 膣
- - 氷/氵 + ゆ/彳 = 致
  - - い/糹/#2 + 氷/氵 + ゆ/彳 = 緻
- - よ/广 + ゆ/彳 = 康
  - - る/忄 + よ/广 + ゆ/彳 = 慷
  - - の/禾 + よ/广 + ゆ/彳 = 糠
  - - せ/食 + よ/广 + ゆ/彳 = 鱇
- - ぬ/力 + ゆ/彳 = 粛
  - - ぬ/力 + ぬ/力 + ゆ/彳 = 肅
    - - れ/口 + ぬ/力 + ゆ/彳 = 嘯
    - - に/氵 + ぬ/力 + ゆ/彳 = 瀟
    - - ち/竹 + ぬ/力 + ゆ/彳 = 簫
    - - 心 + ぬ/力 + ゆ/彳 = 蕭
  - - い/糹/#2 + ぬ/力 + ゆ/彳 = 繍
- - ひ/辶 + ゆ/彳 = 逮
  - - ち/竹 + ひ/辶 + ゆ/彳 = 靆
- - ね/示 + ゆ/彳 = 隷
  - - ね/示 + ね/示 + ゆ/彳 = 隸
- - れ/口 + selector 4 + ゆ/彳 = 咥
- - つ/土 + selector 4 + ゆ/彳 = 垤
- - ふ/女 + selector 4 + ゆ/彳 = 姪
- - き/木 + selector 4 + ゆ/彳 = 桎
- - と/戸 + selector 4 + ゆ/彳 = 耋
- - む/車 + selector 4 + ゆ/彳 = 蛭
- - 心 + 龸 + ゆ/彳 = 棣
- - ゆ/彳 + け/犬 + の/禾 = 臻
- - む/車 + 宿 + ゆ/彳 = 輊
- - ゆ/彳 + 龸 + せ/食 = 鵄

==== Compounds of 兪 ====
- - れ/口 + ゆ/彳 = 喩
- - る/忄 + ゆ/彳 = 愉
- - や/疒 + ゆ/彳 = 癒
  - - や/疒 + や/疒 + ゆ/彳 = 瘉
- - え/訁 + ゆ/彳 = 諭
- - む/車 + ゆ/彳 = 輸
- - 心 + selector 5 + ゆ/彳 = 楡
- - へ/⺩ + selector 5 + ゆ/彳 = 瑜
- - む/車 + selector 5 + ゆ/彳 = 蝓
- - な/亻 + 宿 + ゆ/彳 = 偸
- - ゆ/彳 + 宿 + 心 = 愈
- - て/扌 + 宿 + ゆ/彳 = 揄
- - に/氵 + 龸 + ゆ/彳 = 渝
- - ゆ/彳 + め/目 + 宿 = 覦
- - み/耳 + 宿 + ゆ/彳 = 踰
- - ひ/辶 + 宿 + ゆ/彳 = 逾
- - か/金 + 宿 + ゆ/彳 = 鍮

==== Compounds of 弯 and 彎 ====
- - に/氵 + ゆ/彳 = 湾
  - - に/氵 + に/氵 + ゆ/彳 = 灣

==== Compounds of 弓 and 弖 ====
- - ゆ/彳 + ゆ/彳 = 弱
  - - ふ/女 + ゆ/彳 + ゆ/彳 = 嫋
  - - や/疒 + ゆ/彳 + ゆ/彳 = 嵶
  - - て/扌 + ゆ/彳 + ゆ/彳 = 搦
  - - に/氵 + ゆ/彳 + ゆ/彳 = 溺
  - - 心 + ゆ/彳 + ゆ/彳 = 蒻
  - - せ/食 + ゆ/彳 + ゆ/彳 = 鰯
- - ゆ/彳 + ち/竹 = 弛
- - ゆ/彳 + な/亻 = 夷
  - - ふ/女 + ゆ/彳 + な/亻 = 姨
  - - に/氵 + ゆ/彳 + な/亻 = 洟
  - - や/疒 + ゆ/彳 + な/亻 = 痍
  - - か/金 + ゆ/彳 + な/亻 = 銕
- - ゆ/彳 + 龸 = 弦
- - ゆ/彳 + こ/子 = 弧
- - ゆ/彳 + と/戸 = 張
  - - に/氵 + ゆ/彳 + と/戸 = 漲
- - ゆ/彳 + む/車 = 強
  - - い/糹/#2 + ゆ/彳 + む/車 = 繦
  - - ね/示 + ゆ/彳 + む/車 = 襁
- - ゆ/彳 + れ/口 = 弾
  - - ゆ/彳 + ゆ/彳 + れ/口 = 彈
- - に/氵 + ゆ/彳 + selector 1 = 泓
- - う/宀/#3 + ゆ/彳 + selector 1 = 穹
- - み/耳 + ゆ/彳 + selector 1 = 躬
- - ゆ/彳 + 宿 + む/車 = 弘
- - ゆ/彳 + 宿 + 龸 = 弥
- - ゆ/彳 + ふ/女 + ゑ/訁 = 弩
- - ゆ/彳 + 宿 + み/耳 = 弭
- - ゆ/彳 + ら/月 + ら/月 = 弸
- - ゆ/彳 + 数 + め/目 = 弼
- - ゆ/彳 + 比 + か/金 = 彁
- - ゆ/彳 + 宿 + た/⽥ = 彊
- - ゆ/彳 + 囗 + め/目 = 彌
- - ゆ/彳 + 龸 + た/⽥ = 疆
- - ゆ/彳 + 宿 + の/禾 = 粥
- - ゆ/彳 + 宿 + れ/口 = 鬻

==== Compounds of 彳 ====
- - ゆ/彳 + の/禾 = 役
- - ゆ/彳 + ひ/辶 = 彼
- - ゆ/彳 + へ/⺩ = 往
- - ゆ/彳 + い/糹/#2 = 征
- - ゆ/彳 + け/犬 = 径
  - - ゆ/彳 + ゆ/彳 + け/犬 = 徑
- - ゆ/彳 + し/巿 = 待
- - ゆ/彳 + ふ/女 = 律
  - - 心 + ゆ/彳 + ふ/女 = 葎
- - ゆ/彳 + ゐ/幺 = 後
- - ゆ/彳 + も/門 = 徐
- - ゆ/彳 + は/辶 = 徒
- - ゆ/彳 + よ/广 = 従
  - - ゆ/彳 + ゆ/彳 + よ/广 = 從
    - - る/忄 + ゆ/彳 + よ/广 = 慫
    - - 心 + ゆ/彳 + よ/广 = 樅
    - - み/耳 + ゆ/彳 + よ/广 = 蹤
    - - ゆ/彳 + み/耳 = 聳
- - ゆ/彳 + 日 = 得
- - ゆ/彳 + 火 = 徘
- - ゆ/彳 + さ/阝 = 御
  - - ね/示 + ゆ/彳 + さ/阝 = 禦
- - ゆ/彳 + す/発 = 復
- - ゆ/彳 + め/目 = 循
- - ゆ/彳 + 氷/氵 = 微
  - - 心 + ゆ/彳 + 氷/氵 = 薇
- - ゆ/彳 + ろ/十 = 徳
- - ゆ/彳 + や/疒 = 徴
  - - ゆ/彳 + 心 = 懲
- - ゆ/彳 + ら/月 = 徹
- - ゆ/彳 + 宿 + ほ/方 = 彷
- - ゆ/彳 + 宿 + め/目 = 彿
- - ゆ/彳 + selector 5 + そ/馬 = 徂
- - ゆ/彳 + せ/食 + い/糹/#2 = 徃
- - ゆ/彳 + 日 + す/発 = 徇
- - ゆ/彳 + 宿 + や/疒 = 很
- - ゆ/彳 + 囗 + れ/口 = 徊
- - ゆ/彳 + 宿 + ん/止 = 徙
- - ゆ/彳 + き/木 + な/亻 = 徠
- - ゆ/彳 + 日 + へ/⺩ = 徨
- - ゆ/彳 + 龸 + か/金 = 徭
- - ゆ/彳 + 宿 + 氷/氵 = 徼
- - ゆ/彳 + 宿 + ゐ/幺 = 徽
- - ゆ/彳 + し/巿 + く/艹 = 黴

==== Compounds of 引 ====
- - や/疒 + ゆ/彳 + selector 4 = 矧
- - む/車 + ゆ/彳 + selector 4 = 蚓

==== Compounds of 弔 ====
- - ゆ/彳 + 宿 = 弟
  - - な/亻 + ゆ/彳 + 宿 = 俤
  - - ぬ/力 + ゆ/彳 + 宿 = 剃
  - - る/忄 + ゆ/彳 + 宿 = 悌
  - - き/木 + ゆ/彳 + 宿 = 梯
  - - に/氵 + ゆ/彳 + 宿 = 涕
  - - め/目 + ゆ/彳 + 宿 = 睇
  - - ゆ/彳 + 宿 + せ/食 = 鵜
- - ち/竹 + ゆ/彳 = 第

==== Other compounds ====
- - 囗 + ゆ/彳 = 岡
  - - い/糹/#2 + ゆ/彳 = 綱
  - - か/金 + ゆ/彳 = 鋼
  - - や/疒 + 囗 + ゆ/彳 = 崗
  - - き/木 + 囗 + ゆ/彳 = 棡
- - 仁/亻 + ゆ/彳 = 悠
  - - ち/竹 + 仁/亻 + ゆ/彳 = 筱
  - - い/糹/#2 + 仁/亻 + ゆ/彳 = 絛
  - - ⺼ + 仁/亻 + ゆ/彳 = 脩
- - ほ/方 + ゆ/彳 = 旅
  - - ⺼ + ほ/方 + ゆ/彳 = 膂
- - き/木 + ゆ/彳 = 樹
- - 囗 + 囗 + ゆ/彳 = 堽
