= Braille pattern dots-0 =

Braille pattern

6-dot braille cells
⠀	⠁	⠃	⠉	⠙	⠑	⠋	⠛	⠓	⠊	⠚	⠈	⠘
⠄	⠅	⠇	⠍	⠝	⠕	⠏	⠟	⠗	⠎	⠞	⠌	⠜
⠤	⠥	⠧	⠭	⠽	⠵	⠯	⠿	⠷	⠮	⠾	⠬	⠼
⠠	⠡	⠣	⠩	⠹	⠱	⠫	⠻	⠳	⠪	⠺	⠨	⠸
shift down	⠂	⠆	⠒	⠲	⠢	⠖	⠶	⠦	⠔	⠴	⠐	⠰

The Braille pattern dots-0 ( ⠀ ), also called a blank Braille pattern, is a 6-dot or 8-dot braille cell with no dots raised. It is represented by the Unicode code point U+2800, and in Braille ASCII with a space.

Character information
Preview	⠀ (braille pattern blank)	
Unicode name	BRAILLE PATTERN BLANK	
Encodings	decimal	hex
Unicode	10240	U+2800
UTF-8	226 160 128	E2 A0 80
Numeric character reference	&#10240;	&#x2800;
Braille ASCII	32	20

== Unified Braille ==
In all braille systems, the braille pattern dots-0 is used to represent a space or the lack of content. In particular some fonts display the character as a fixed-width blank. However, the Unicode standard explicitly states that it does not act as a space, a statement added in response to a comment that it should be treated as a space.

== Plus dots 7 and 8 ==
Related to Braille pattern dots-0 are Braille patterns 7, 8, and 78, which are used in 8-dot braille systems, such as Gardner-Salinas and Luxembourgish Braille.

Character information
Preview	⡀ (braille pattern dots-7)		⢀ (braille pattern dots-8)		⣀ (braille pattern dots-78)	
Unicode name	BRAILLE PATTERN DOTS-7		BRAILLE PATTERN DOTS-8		BRAILLE PATTERN DOTS-78	
Encodings	decimal	hex	dec	hex	dec	hex
Unicode	10304	U+2840	10368	U+2880	10432	U+28C0
UTF-8	226 161 128	E2 A1 80	226 162 128	E2 A2 80	226 163 128	E2 A3 80
Numeric character reference	&#10304;	&#x2840;	&#10368;	&#x2880;	&#10432;	&#x28C0;

	dot 7	dot 8	dots 78
Gardner Salinas Braille	end misc. symbol		invert modifier
