= Braille pattern dots-235 =

Braille pattern

6-dot braille cells
⠀	⠁	⠃	⠉	⠙	⠑	⠋	⠛	⠓	⠊	⠚	⠈	⠘
⠄	⠅	⠇	⠍	⠝	⠕	⠏	⠟	⠗	⠎	⠞	⠌	⠜
⠤	⠥	⠧	⠭	⠽	⠵	⠯	⠿	⠷	⠮	⠾	⠬	⠼
⠠	⠡	⠣	⠩	⠹	⠱	⠫	⠻	⠳	⠪	⠺	⠨	⠸
shift down	⠂	⠆	⠒	⠲	⠢	⠖	⠶	⠦	⠔	⠴	⠐	⠰

The Braille pattern dots-235 ( ⠖ ) is a 6-dot braille cell with dots raised, or an 8-dot braille cell with raised. It is represented by the Unicode code point U+2816, and in Braille ASCII with the number 6.

Character information
Preview	⠖ (braille pattern dots-235)	
Unicode name	BRAILLE PATTERN DOTS-235	
Encodings	decimal	hex
Unicode	10262	U+2816
UTF-8	226 160 150	E2 A0 96
Numeric character reference	&#10262;	&#x2816;
Braille ASCII	54	36

== Unified Braille ==
In unified international braille, the braille pattern dots-235 is used to represent an exclamation point, other punctuation, and otherwise assigned as needed.

=== Table of unified braille values ===
French Braille	! (exclamation), (math) + (plus sign), pro-, pr, "puis"
English Braille	! (exclamation), -ff-
English Contraction	to-†
German Braille	an
Bharati Braille	फ / ਫ / ફ / ফ / ଫ / ఫ / ಫ / ഫ پھ
IPA Braille	hook and barred consonant modifier
Russian Braille	! (exclamation)
Slovak Braille	! (exclamation)
Arabic Braille	! (exclamation)
Thai Braille	เ◌า ao

† Abolished in Unified English Braille

== Other braille ==
Japanese Braille	we / ゑ / ヱ
Korean Braille	-k / ㅋ
Mainland Chinese Braille	ao, -
Taiwanese Braille	yong, -iong / ㄩㄥ
Two-Cell Chinese Braille	是 -shì (suffix)
Nemeth Braille	6

== Plus dots 7 and 8 ==
Related to Braille pattern dots-235 are Braille patterns 2357, 2358, and 23578, which are used in 8-dot braille systems, such as Gardner-Salinas and Luxembourgish Braille.

Character information
Preview	⡖ (braille pattern dots-2357)		⢖ (braille pattern dots-2358)		⣖ (braille pattern dots-23578)	
Unicode name	BRAILLE PATTERN DOTS-2357		BRAILLE PATTERN DOTS-2358		BRAILLE PATTERN DOTS-23578	
Encodings	decimal	hex	dec	hex	dec	hex
Unicode	10326	U+2856	10390	U+2896	10454	U+28D6
UTF-8	226 161 150	E2 A1 96	226 162 150	E2 A2 96	226 163 150	E2 A3 96
Numeric character reference	&#10326;	&#x2856;	&#10390;	&#x2896;	&#10454;	&#x28D6;

	dots 2357	dots 2358	dots 23578
Gardner Salinas Braille			open math expression / hyperlink

== Related 8-dot kantenji patterns ==
In the Japanese kantenji braille, the standard 8-dot Braille patterns 367, 1367, 3467, and 13467 are the patterns related to Braille pattern dots-235, since the two additional dots of kantenji patterns 0235, 2357, and 02357 are placed above the base 6-dot cell, instead of below, as in standard 8-dot braille.

Character information
Preview	⡤ (braille pattern dots-367)		⡥ (braille pattern dots-1367)		⡬ (braille pattern dots-3467)		⡭ (braille pattern dots-13467)	
Unicode name	BRAILLE PATTERN DOTS-367		BRAILLE PATTERN DOTS-1367		BRAILLE PATTERN DOTS-3467		BRAILLE PATTERN DOTS-13467	
Encodings	decimal	hex	dec	hex	dec	hex	dec	hex
Unicode	10340	U+2864	10341	U+2865	10348	U+286C	10349	U+286D
UTF-8	226 161 164	E2 A1 A4	226 161 165	E2 A1 A5	226 161 172	E2 A1 AC	226 161 173	E2 A1 AD
Numeric character reference	&#10340;	&#x2864;	&#10341;	&#x2865;	&#10348;	&#x286C;	&#10349;	&#x286D;

=== Kantenji using braille patterns 367, 1367, 3467, or 13467 ===
This listing includes kantenji using Braille pattern dots-235 for all 6349 kanji found in JIS C 6226-1978.

- - 語

==== Variants and thematic compounds ====
- - selector 1 + ゑ/訁 = 叉
- - selector 4 + ゑ/訁 = 又
- - ゑ/訁 + selector 4 = 詠

==== Compounds of 語 and 訁 ====
- - け/犬 + ゑ/訁 = 獄
  - - や/疒 + ゑ/訁 = 嶽
- - ひ/辶 + ゑ/訁 = 這
- - ゑ/訁 + ろ/十 = 訊
- - ゑ/訁 + か/金 = 訓
- - ゑ/訁 + こ/子 = 訟
- - ゑ/訁 + て/扌 = 訣
- - ゑ/訁 + た/⽥ = 訳
  - - ゑ/訁 + ゑ/訁 + た/⽥ = 譯
- - ゑ/訁 + を/貝 = 訴
- - ゑ/訁 + う/宀/#3 = 診
- - ゑ/訁 + い/糹/#2 = 証
  - - ゑ/訁 + ゑ/訁 + い/糹/#2 = 證
- - ゑ/訁 + に/氵 = 詣
- - ゑ/訁 + 囗 = 試
- - ゑ/訁 + し/巿 = 詩
- - ゑ/訁 + な/亻 = 詫
- - ゑ/訁 + り/分 = 詮
- - ゑ/訁 + れ/口 = 詰
- - ゑ/訁 + ゐ/幺 = 該
- - ゑ/訁 + そ/馬 = 詳
- - ゑ/訁 + 宿 = 誂
- - ゑ/訁 + 心 = 誌
- - ゑ/訁 + ぬ/力 = 認
- - ゑ/訁 + は/辶 = 誨
- - ゑ/訁 + 火 = 誹
- - ゑ/訁 + つ/土 = 調
- - ゑ/訁 + せ/食 = 請
- - ゑ/訁 + ひ/辶 = 諌
- - ゑ/訁 + ゆ/彳 = 諛
- - ゑ/訁 + ん/止 = 諮
- - ゑ/訁 + ま/石 = 諳
- - ゑ/訁 + 日 = 諸
  - - 心 + ゑ/訁 + 日 = 藷
- - ゑ/訁 + る/忄 = 謀
- - ゑ/訁 + ほ/方 = 謗
- - ゑ/訁 + け/犬 = 謙
- - ゑ/訁 + む/車 = 講
- - ゑ/訁 + き/木 = 謹
- - ゑ/訁 + み/耳 = 譲
  - - ゑ/訁 + ゑ/訁 + み/耳 = 讓
- - ゑ/訁 + 数 = 讐
- - ゑ/訁 + 比 + ひ/辶 = 諫
- - う/宀/#3 + 宿 + ゑ/訁 = 謇
- - ゑ/訁 + 宿 + 数 = 讎

==== Compounds of 叉 ====
- - む/車 + ゑ/訁 = 蚤
- - て/扌 + selector 1 + ゑ/訁 = 扠
- - か/金 + selector 1 + ゑ/訁 = 釵
- - と/戸 + selector 1 + ゑ/訁 = 靫

==== Compounds of 又 ====
- - 仁/亻 + ゑ/訁 = 侵
- - ぬ/力 + ゑ/訁 = 努
- - ろ/十 + ゑ/訁 = 友
  - - の/禾 + ろ/十 + ゑ/訁 = 秡
  - - み/耳 + ろ/十 + ゑ/訁 = 跋
  - - し/巿 + ろ/十 + ゑ/訁 = 黻
- - ゑ/訁 + ゑ/訁 = 双
- - へ/⺩ + ゑ/訁 = 収
  - - へ/⺩ + へ/⺩ + ゑ/訁 = 收
- - う/宀/#3 + ゑ/訁 = 叔
  - - な/亻 + う/宀/#3 + ゑ/訁 = 俶
  - - 心 + う/宀/#3 + ゑ/訁 = 椒
- - み/耳 + ゑ/訁 = 取
  - - ふ/女 + み/耳 + ゑ/訁 = 娶
  - - て/扌 + み/耳 + ゑ/訁 = 掫
  - - え/訁 + み/耳 + ゑ/訁 = 諏
  - - む/車 + み/耳 + ゑ/訁 = 輙
  - - さ/阝 + み/耳 + ゑ/訁 = 陬
  - - そ/馬 + み/耳 + ゑ/訁 = 驟
- - 龸 + ゑ/訁 = 受
  - - ゐ/幺 + 龸 + ゑ/訁 = 綬
- - り/分 + ゑ/訁 = 叙
  - - selector 1 + り/分 + ゑ/訁 = 敍
  - - り/分 + り/分 + ゑ/訁 = 敘
- - め/目 + ゑ/訁 = 叡
- - き/木 + ゑ/訁 = 叢
- - れ/口 + ゑ/訁 = 啜
- - ふ/女 + ゑ/訁 = 奴
  - - れ/口 + ふ/女 + ゑ/訁 = 呶
  - - こ/子 + ふ/女 + ゑ/訁 = 孥
  - - し/巿 + ふ/女 + ゑ/訁 = 帑
  - - ゆ/彳 + ふ/女 + ゑ/訁 = 弩
  - - て/扌 + ふ/女 + ゑ/訁 = 拏
  - - そ/馬 + ふ/女 + ゑ/訁 = 駑
- - 宿 + ゑ/訁 = 寝
  - - 宿 + 宿 + ゑ/訁 = 寢
- - よ/广 + ゑ/訁 = 度
  - - に/氵 + ゑ/訁 = 渡
  - - か/金 + よ/广 + ゑ/訁 = 鍍
- - て/扌 + ゑ/訁 = 抜
  - - て/扌 + て/扌 + ゑ/訁 = 拔
- - 日 + ゑ/訁 = 最
  - - き/木 + 日 + ゑ/訁 = 樶
- - 心 + ゑ/訁 = 桑
- - つ/土 + ゑ/訁 = 殻
  - - る/忄 + つ/土 + ゑ/訁 = 愨
  - - つ/土 + つ/土 + ゑ/訁 = 殼
- - 氷/氵 + ゑ/訁 = 浸
- - た/⽥ + ゑ/訁 = 畷
- - ね/示 + ゑ/訁 = 祓
- - ゐ/幺 + ゑ/訁 = 綴
- - ⺼ + ゑ/訁 = 腎
- - も/門 + ゑ/訁 = 警
- - は/辶 + ゑ/訁 = 趣
- - い/糹/#2 + ゑ/訁 = 隻
  - - め/目 + い/糹/#2 + ゑ/訁 = 矍
- - せ/食 + ゑ/訁 = 餐
- - お/頁 + ゑ/訁 = 魃
- - う/宀/#3 + selector 4 + ゑ/訁 = 攴
- - 火 + selector 4 + ゑ/訁 = 燮
- - ゑ/訁 + ゑ/訁 + ゑ/訁 = 雙
- - ふ/女 + 龸 + ゑ/訁 = 娵
- - ゑ/訁 + 宿 + そ/馬 = 聚
- - 心 + 宿 + ゑ/訁 = 菽
- - む/車 + 宿 + ゑ/訁 = 輟
- - か/金 + 宿 + ゑ/訁 = 錣
- - そ/馬 + 宿 + ゑ/訁 = 馭

==== Other compounds ====
- - さ/阝 + ゑ/訁 = 陰
  - - く/艹 + さ/阝 + ゑ/訁 = 蔭
- - そ/馬 + ゑ/訁 = 駁
