= Braille pattern dots-356 =

Braille pattern

6-dot braille cells
⠀	⠁	⠃	⠉	⠙	⠑	⠋	⠛	⠓	⠊	⠚	⠈	⠘
⠄	⠅	⠇	⠍	⠝	⠕	⠏	⠟	⠗	⠎	⠞	⠌	⠜
⠤	⠥	⠧	⠭	⠽	⠵	⠯	⠿	⠷	⠮	⠾	⠬	⠼
⠠	⠡	⠣	⠩	⠹	⠱	⠫	⠻	⠳	⠪	⠺	⠨	⠸
shift down	⠂	⠆	⠒	⠲	⠢	⠖	⠶	⠦	⠔	⠴	⠐	⠰

The Braille pattern dots-356 ( ⠴ ) is a 6-dot braille cell with the middle right and both bottom dots raised, or an 8-dot braille cell with the upper-middle right and both lower-middle dots raised. It is represented by the Unicode code point U+2834, and in Braille ASCII with the number 0.

Character information
Preview	⠴ (braille pattern dots-356)	
Unicode name	BRAILLE PATTERN DOTS-356	
Encodings	decimal	hex
Unicode	10292	U+2834
UTF-8	226 160 180	E2 A0 B4
Numeric character reference	&#10292;	&#x2834;
Braille ASCII	48	30

== Unified Braille ==
In unified international braille, the braille pattern dots-356 is used to represent various punctuation, often coupled with Braille pattern dots-236 as a closing mark.

=== Table of unified braille values ===
French Braille	) (close parenthesis), trans-, tr, "sous"
English Braille	” (close quote)
English Contraction	by †, was
German Braille	ar
Bharati Braille	झ / ਝ / ઝ / ঝ / ଝ / ఝ / ಝ / ഝ / ඣ / جھ
IPA Braille	barred vowel mark
Russian Braille	» (close quote)
Slovak Braille	) (close parenthesis)
Arabic Braille	close quote
Thai Braille	์ (virama)

† Abolished in Unified English Braille

== Other braille ==
Japanese Braille	'n / ん / ン
Korean Braille	-h / ㅎ
Taiwanese Braille	ei / ㄟ, yo / ㄧㄛ, } (end bracket)
Two-Cell Chinese Braille	ru-
Nemeth Braille	0

== Plus dots 7 and 8 ==
Related to Braille pattern dots-356 are Braille patterns 3567, 3568, and 35678, which are used in 8-dot braille systems, such as Gardner-Salinas and Luxembourgish Braille.

Character information
Preview	⡴ (braille pattern dots-3567)		⢴ (braille pattern dots-3568)		⣴ (braille pattern dots-35678)	
Unicode name	BRAILLE PATTERN DOTS-3567		BRAILLE PATTERN DOTS-3568		BRAILLE PATTERN DOTS-35678	
Encodings	decimal	hex	dec	hex	dec	hex
Unicode	10356	U+2874	10420	U+28B4	10484	U+28F4
UTF-8	226 161 180	E2 A1 B4	226 162 180	E2 A2 B4	226 163 180	E2 A3 B4
Numeric character reference	&#10356;	&#x2874;	&#10420;	&#x28B4;	&#10484;	&#x28F4;

	dots 3567	dots 3568	dots 35678
Gardner Salinas Braille		← (left arrow)	] (close bracket)

== Related 8-dot kantenji patterns ==
In the Japanese kantenji braille, the standard 8-dot Braille patterns 678, 1678, 4678, and 14678 are the patterns related to Braille pattern dots-356, since the two additional dots of kantenji patterns 0356, 3567, and 03567 are placed above the base 6-dot cell, instead of below, as in standard 8-dot braille.

Character information
Preview	⣠ (braille pattern dots-678)		⣡ (braille pattern dots-1678)		⣨ (braille pattern dots-4678)		⣩ (braille pattern dots-14678)	
Unicode name	BRAILLE PATTERN DOTS-678		BRAILLE PATTERN DOTS-1678		BRAILLE PATTERN DOTS-4678		BRAILLE PATTERN DOTS-14678	
Encodings	decimal	hex	dec	hex	dec	hex	dec	hex
Unicode	10464	U+28E0	10465	U+28E1	10472	U+28E8	10473	U+28E9
UTF-8	226 163 160	E2 A3 A0	226 163 161	E2 A3 A1	226 163 168	E2 A3 A8	226 163 169	E2 A3 A9
Numeric character reference	&#10464;	&#x28E0;	&#10465;	&#x28E1;	&#10472;	&#x28E8;	&#10473;	&#x28E9;

=== Kantenji using braille patterns 678, 1678, 4678, or 14678 ===
This listing includes kantenji using Braille pattern dots-356 for all 6349 kanji found in JIS C 6226-1978.

- - 止

==== Variants and thematic compounds ====
- - ん/止 + selector 1 = 欠
- - selector 1 + ん/止 = 氏
- - selector 4 + ん/止 = 缶
- - selector 6 + ん/止 = 焉
- - 比 + ん/止 = 低

==== Compounds of 止 ====
- - 仁/亻 + ん/止 = 企
- - 囗 + ん/止 = 武
  - - お/頁 + ん/止 = 賦
  - - 龸 + 囗 + ん/止 = 斌
    - - を/貝 + 囗 + ん/止 = 贇
  - - か/金 + 囗 + ん/止 = 錻
- - こ/子 + ん/止 = 歴
  - - き/木 + こ/子 + ん/止 = 櫪
  - - に/氵 + こ/子 + ん/止 = 瀝
  - - や/疒 + こ/子 + ん/止 = 癧
  - - む/車 + こ/子 + ん/止 = 轣
  - - ち/竹 + こ/子 + ん/止 = 靂
- - に/氵 + ん/止 = 渋
  - - に/氵 + ん/止 + お/頁 = 瀕
  - - に/氵 + に/氵 + ん/止 = 澁
- - ね/示 + ん/止 = 祉
- - の/禾 + ん/止 = 穢
- - ん/止 + む/車 = 凪
- - ん/止 + つ/土 = 址
- - ん/止 + て/扌 = 捗
- - ん/止 + そ/馬 = 歩
  - - さ/阝 + ん/止 + そ/馬 = 陟
- - ん/止 + の/禾 = 歯
  - - ん/止 + ろ/十 = 齢
    - - ん/止 + ん/止 + ろ/十 = 齡
  - - ん/止 + も/門 = 齣
  - - れ/口 + ん/止 + の/禾 = 噛
  - - ん/止 + ん/止 + の/禾 = 齒
    - - せ/食 + ん/止 + の/禾 = 囓
    - - ひ/辶 + ん/止 + の/禾 = 齔
    - - そ/馬 + ん/止 + の/禾 = 齟
    - - 囗 + ん/止 + の/禾 = 齠
    - - や/疒 + ん/止 + の/禾 = 齦
    - - ぬ/力 + ん/止 + の/禾 = 齧
    - - み/耳 + ん/止 + の/禾 = 齲
    - - け/犬 + ん/止 + の/禾 = 齶
- - ん/止 + り/分 = 帰
  - - ん/止 + ん/止 + り/分 = 歸
- - ん/止 + ひ/辶 = 歳
- - ん/止 + に/氵 = 渉
- - ん/止 + ら/月 = 肯
- - ん/止 + お/頁 = 頻
  - - 心 + ん/止 + お/頁 = 蘋
- - く/艹 + ん/止 + ん/止 = 蕋
- - ゆ/彳 + 宿 + ん/止 = 徙
- - に/氵 + 龸 + ん/止 = 沚
- - に/氵 + う/宀/#3 + ん/止 = 澀
- - ち/竹 + 宿 + ん/止 = 篶
- - み/耳 + 宿 + ん/止 = 耻
- - み/耳 + 龸 + ん/止 = 趾
- - さ/阝 + 宿 + ん/止 = 阯
- - ん/止 + み/耳 + selector 2 = 齪
- - ん/止 + ら/月 + れ/口 = 齬
- - ん/止 + と/戸 + ゆ/彳 = 齷

==== Compounds of 欠 ====
- - れ/口 + ん/止 = 吹
- - や/疒 + ん/止 = 嵌
- - 氷/氵 + ん/止 = 次
  - - ふ/女 + ん/止 = 姿
  - - そ/馬 + ん/止 = 羨
  - - 心 + ん/止 = 茨
  - - ん/止 + ⺼ = 盗
    - - ん/止 + ん/止 + ⺼ = 盜
  - - れ/口 + 氷/氵 + ん/止 = 咨
    - - ゑ/訁 + ん/止 = 諮
  - - る/忄 + 氷/氵 + ん/止 = 恣
  - - か/金 + 氷/氵 + ん/止 = 瓷
  - - の/禾 + 氷/氵 + ん/止 = 粢
- - も/門 + ん/止 = 欧
  - - も/門 + も/門 + ん/止 = 歐
- - た/⽥ + ん/止 = 欲
  - - る/忄 + た/⽥ + ん/止 = 慾
- - か/金 + ん/止 = 歌
- - く/艹 + ん/止 = 歎
- - け/犬 + ん/止 = 歓
  - - け/犬 + け/犬 + ん/止 = 歡
- - 火 + ん/止 = 炊
- - む/車 + ん/止 = 軟
- - ん/止 + を/貝 = 欣
  - - て/扌 + ん/止 + を/貝 = 掀
- - ん/止 + き/木 = 欺
- - ん/止 + か/金 = 欽
- - ん/止 + ね/示 = 款
- - ん/止 + せ/食 = 飲
  - - ん/止 + ん/止 + せ/食 = 飮
- - よ/广 + ん/止 + selector 1 = 厥
  - - け/犬 + ん/止 + selector 1 = 獗
  - - み/耳 + ん/止 + selector 1 = 蹶
- - つ/土 + ん/止 + selector 1 = 坎
- - そ/馬 + ん/止 + selector 1 = 歃
- - 氷/氵 + ん/止 + selector 1 = 歇
- - ち/竹 + ん/止 + selector 1 = 篏
- - ん/止 + ん/止 + selector 1 = 缺
- - む/車 + ん/止 + selector 1 = 蠍
- - も/門 + ん/止 + selector 1 = 闕
- - 囗 + 宿 + ん/止 = 嗽
- - る/忄 + 宿 + ん/止 = 懿
- - ん/止 + め/目 + し/巿 = 欷
- - ん/止 + selector 6 + む/車 = 欸
- - ん/止 + け/犬 + か/金 = 欹
- - ん/止 + り/分 + け/犬 = 歉
- - ん/止 + す/発 + 火 = 歔
- - ん/止 + り/分 + 囗 = 歙
- - ん/止 + selector 6 + り/分 = 歛
- - ん/止 + 宿 + selector 4 = 歟
- - に/氵 + 宿 + ん/止 = 漱

==== Compounds of 氏 ====
- - 日 + ん/止 = 昏
  - - き/木 + 日 + ん/止 = 棔
- - は/辶 + ん/止 = 反
  - - な/亻 + ん/止 = 仮
    - - な/亻 + な/亻 + ん/止 = 假
  - - ろ/十 + ん/止 = 叛
  - - つ/土 + ん/止 = 坂
  - - き/木 + ん/止 = 板
  - - へ/⺩ + ん/止 = 版
  - - を/貝 + ん/止 = 販
  - - ひ/辶 + ん/止 = 返
  - - さ/阝 + ん/止 = 阪
  - - せ/食 + ん/止 = 飯
  - - に/氵 + は/辶 + ん/止 = 汳
  - - 日 + は/辶 + ん/止 = 皈
  - - か/金 + は/辶 + ん/止 = 鈑
- - み/耳 + ん/止 = 民
  - - め/目 + ん/止 = 眠
  - - す/発 + ん/止 = 罠
  - - や/疒 + み/耳 + ん/止 = 岷
  - - る/忄 + み/耳 + ん/止 = 愍
  - - ほ/方 + み/耳 + ん/止 = 氓
  - - に/氵 + み/耳 + ん/止 = 泯
  - - い/糹/#2 + み/耳 + ん/止 = 緡
- - い/糹/#2 + ん/止 = 紙
- - ん/止 + ふ/女 = 婚
- - や/疒 + selector 1 + ん/止 = 岻
- - し/巿 + selector 1 + ん/止 = 帋
- - そ/馬 + selector 1 + ん/止 = 牴
- - ま/石 + selector 1 + ん/止 = 砥
- - ね/示 + selector 1 + ん/止 = 祇
- - ⺼ + selector 1 + ん/止 = 胝
- - 囗 + selector 1 + ん/止 = 觝
- - え/訁 + selector 1 + ん/止 = 詆
- - そ/馬 + 宿 + ん/止 = 羝
- - ん/止 + れ/口 + せ/食 = 舐
- - き/木 + よ/广 + ん/止 = 柢
- - ね/示 + 宿 + ん/止 = 祗
- - ん/止 + 宿 + せ/食 = 鴟

==== Compounds of 缶 ====
- - ん/止 + け/犬 = 罐
- - ん/止 + さ/阝 = 卸
  - - れ/口 + ん/止 + さ/阝 = 啣
- - ん/止 + こ/子 + selector 1 = 缸
- - ん/止 + 宿 + す/発 = 罅
- - ん/止 + を/貝 + を/貝 = 罌
- - ん/止 + た/⽥ + た/⽥ = 罍
- - ん/止 + 日 + ち/竹 = 罎

==== Compounds of 焉 and 正 ====
- - ん/止 + い/糹/#2 = 正
  - - 心 + ん/止 + い/糹/#2 = 柾
  - - ふ/女 + ん/止 + い/糹/#2 = 歪
  - - か/金 + ん/止 + い/糹/#2 = 鉦
- - ん/止 + 氷/氵 = 政
- - ん/止 + 数 = 整
- - ふ/女 + selector 6 + ん/止 = 嫣
- - ん/止 + 宿 + も/門 = 丐
- - す/発 + 宿 + ん/止 = 麪

==== Compounds of 低 ====
- - よ/广 + ん/止 = 底
- - て/扌 + ん/止 = 抵

==== Other compounds ====
- - え/訁 + ん/止 = 円
  - - え/訁 + え/訁 + ん/止 = 圓
- - ち/竹 + ん/止 = 零
  - - に/氵 + ち/竹 + ん/止 = 澪
- - に/氵 + ん/止 + selector 2 = 滷
- - れ/口 + 宿 + ん/止 = 唄
- - ふ/女 + 宿 + ん/止 = 嫩
- - え/訁 + か/金 + ん/止 = 謌
- - ん/止 + 宿 + り/分 = 鹸
- - ん/止 + ひ/辶 + selector 3 = 鹹
