= Braille pattern dots-236 =

Braille pattern

6-dot braille cells
| ⠀ | ⠁ | ⠃ | ⠉ | ⠙ | ⠑ | ⠋ | ⠛ | ⠓ | ⠊ | ⠚ | ⠈ | ⠘ |
| ⠄ | ⠅ | ⠇ | ⠍ | ⠝ | ⠕ | ⠏ | ⠟ | ⠗ | ⠎ | ⠞ | ⠌ | ⠜ |
| ⠤ | ⠥ | ⠧ | ⠭ | ⠽ | ⠵ | ⠯ | ⠿ | ⠷ | ⠮ | ⠾ | ⠬ | ⠼ |
| ⠠ | ⠡ | ⠣ | ⠩ | ⠹ | ⠱ | ⠫ | ⠻ | ⠳ | ⠪ | ⠺ | ⠨ | ⠸ |
| shift down | ⠂ | ⠆ | ⠒ | ⠲ | ⠢ | ⠖ | ⠶ | ⠦ | ⠔ | ⠴ | ⠐ | ⠰ |

The Braille pattern dots-236 ( ⠦ ) is a 6-dot braille cell with the middle left and both bottom dots raised, or an 8-dot braille cell with the upper-middle left and both lower-middle dots raised. It is represented by the Unicode code point U+2826, and in Braille ASCII with the number 8.

Character information
| Preview | ⠦ (braille pattern dots-236) | |
|---|---|---|
| Unicode name | BRAILLE PATTERN DOTS-236 | |
| Encodings | decimal | hex |
| Unicode | 10278 | U+2826 |
| UTF-8 | 226 160 166 | E2 A0 A6 |
| Numeric character reference | &#10278; | &#x2826; |
| Braille ASCII | 56 | 38 |

== Unified Braille ==
In unified international braille, the braille pattern dots-236 is used to represent various punctuation, often coupled with Braille pattern dots-356 as an opening mark.

=== Table of unified braille values ===
| French Braille | ( (open parenthesis), er, "du" |
| English Braille | ? (question mark), “ (opening quote) |
| English Contraction | his |
| German Braille | tt |
| Bharati Braille | ? (question mark), “ (opening quote) |
| IPA Braille | hook top, curly tail, loop modifier |
| Russian Braille | « (open quote) |
| Slovak Braille | ( (open parenthesis) |
| Arabic Braille | ـٌ (tanwīn) |
| Thai Braille | ๋ (tone 4) |

== Other braille ==
| Korean Braille | -t / ㅌ |
| Mainland Chinese Braille | ang |
| Taiwanese Braille | yue, -üe / ㄩㄝ, { (opening bracket) |
| Two-Cell Chinese Braille | p- |
| Nemeth Braille | 8 |

== Plus dots 7 and 8 ==
Related to Braille pattern dots-236 are Braille patterns 2367, 2368, and 23678, which are used in 8-dot braille systems, such as Gardner-Salinas and Luxembourgish Braille.

Character information
| Preview | ⡦ (braille pattern dots-2367) | | ⢦ (braille pattern dots-2368) | | ⣦ (braille pattern dots-23678) | |
|---|---|---|---|---|---|---|
| Unicode name | BRAILLE PATTERN DOTS-2367 | | BRAILLE PATTERN DOTS-2368 | | BRAILLE PATTERN DOTS-23678 | |
| Encodings | decimal | hex | dec | hex | dec | hex |
| Unicode | 10342 | U+2866 | 10406 | U+28A6 | 10470 | U+28E6 |
| UTF-8 | 226 161 166 | E2 A1 A6 | 226 162 166 | E2 A2 A6 | 226 163 166 | E2 A3 A6 |
| Numeric character reference | &#10342; | &#x2866; | &#10406; | &#x28A6; | &#10470; | &#x28E6; |

| | dots 2367 | dots 2368 | dots 23678 |
|---|---|---|---|
| Gardner Salinas Braille | → (right arrow) | | [ (open bracket) |

== Related 8-dot kantenji patterns ==
In the Japanese kantenji braille, the standard 8-dot Braille patterns 378, 1378, 3478, and 13478 are the patterns related to Braille pattern dots-236, since the two additional dots of kantenji patterns 0236, 2367, and 02367 are placed above the base 6-dot cell, instead of below, as in standard 8-dot braille.

Character information
| Preview | ⣄ (braille pattern dots-378) | | ⣅ (braille pattern dots-1378) | | ⣌ (braille pattern dots-3478) | | ⣍ (braille pattern dots-13478) | |
|---|---|---|---|---|---|---|---|---|
| Unicode name | BRAILLE PATTERN DOTS-378 | | BRAILLE PATTERN DOTS-1378 | | BRAILLE PATTERN DOTS-3478 | | BRAILLE PATTERN DOTS-13478 | |
| Encodings | decimal | hex | dec | hex | dec | hex | dec | hex |
| Unicode | 10436 | U+28C4 | 10437 | U+28C5 | 10444 | U+28CC | 10445 | U+28CD |
| UTF-8 | 226 163 132 | E2 A3 84 | 226 163 133 | E2 A3 85 | 226 163 140 | E2 A3 8C | 226 163 141 | E2 A3 8D |
| Numeric character reference | &#10436; | &#x28C4; | &#10437; | &#x28C5; | &#10444; | &#x28CC; | &#10445; | &#x28CD; |

=== Kantenji using braille patterns 378, 1378, 3478, or 13478 ===
This listing includes kantenji using Braille pattern dots-236 for all 6349 kanji found in JIS C 6226-1978.

- - 日

==== Variants and thematic compounds ====
- - selector 4 + 日 = 旦
- - selector 5 + 日 = 亘
- - 日 + selector 1 = 白
- - 日 + selector 4 = 旧
- - 日 + selector 6 = 曰

==== Compounds of 日 ====
- - 龸 + 日 = 冥
  - - し/巿 + 龸 + 日 = 幎
  - - 日 + 龸 + 日 = 暝
  - - 心 + 龸 + 日 = 榠
  - - に/氵 + 龸 + 日 = 溟
  - - め/目 + 龸 + 日 = 瞑
  - - む/車 + 龸 + 日 = 螟
- - よ/广 + 日 = 厚
- - れ/口 + 日 = 唱
- - 宿 + 日 = 宴
- - し/巿 + 日 = 幟
- - り/分 + 日 = 昌
  - - な/亻 + り/分 + 日 = 倡
  - - ふ/女 + り/分 + 日 = 娼
  - - き/木 + り/分 + 日 = 椙
  - - け/犬 + り/分 + 日 = 猖
  - - 心 + り/分 + 日 = 菖
- - け/犬 + 日 = 春
  - - る/忄 + け/犬 + 日 = 惷
  - - 心 + け/犬 + 日 = 椿
  - - せ/食 + け/犬 + 日 = 鰆
- - や/疒 + 日 = 智
- - こ/子 + 日 = 暦
- - く/艹 + 日 = 暮
- - に/氵 + 日 = 潮
- - ち/竹 + 日 = 簡
- - い/糹/#2 + 日 = 織
- - と/戸 + 日 = 者
  - - ほ/方 + 日 = 屠
  - - 日 + 日 = 暑
  - - 火 + 日 = 煮
  - - ゐ/幺 + 日 = 緒
  - - す/発 + 日 = 署
    - - 心 + す/発 + 日 = 薯
  - - ゑ/訁 + 日 = 諸
    - - 心 + ゑ/訁 + 日 = 藷
  - - を/貝 + 日 = 賭
  - - な/亻 + と/戸 + 日 = 偖
  - - け/犬 + と/戸 + 日 = 奢
  - - 心 + と/戸 + 日 = 楮
  - - に/氵 + と/戸 + 日 = 渚
  - - 氷/氵 + と/戸 + 日 = 瀦
  - - め/目 + と/戸 + 日 = 睹
  - - か/金 + と/戸 + 日 = 赭
  - - も/門 + と/戸 + 日 = 闍
- - み/耳 + 日 = 職
- - え/訁 + 日 = 識
- - も/門 + 日 = 間
  - - つ/土 + も/門 + 日 = 墹
  - - 火 + も/門 + 日 = 燗
- - ま/石 + 日 = 音
  - - 日 + ま/石 = 暗
  - - し/巿 + ま/石 + 日 = 黯
- - お/頁 + 日 = 題
- - の/禾 + 日 = 香
  - - す/発 + の/禾 + 日 = 馥
  - - み/耳 + の/禾 + 日 = 馨
- - 日 + と/戸 = 卓
  - - な/亻 + 日 + と/戸 = 倬
  - - れ/口 + 日 + と/戸 = 啅
  - - て/扌 + 日 + と/戸 = 掉
  - - き/木 + 日 + と/戸 = 棹
  - - い/糹/#2 + 日 + と/戸 = 綽
  - - す/発 + 日 + と/戸 = 罩
- - 日 + う/宀/#3 = 影
- - 日 + ろ/十 = 早
  - - 氷/氵 + 日 + ろ/十 = 覃
    - - に/氵 + 日 + ろ/十 = 潭
    - - ち/竹 + 日 + ろ/十 = 簟
    - - 心 + 日 + ろ/十 = 蕈
    - - え/訁 + 日 + ろ/十 = 譚
    - - か/金 + 日 + ろ/十 = 鐔
- - 日 + す/発 = 旬
  - - ゆ/彳 + 日 + す/発 = 徇
  - - る/忄 + 日 + す/発 = 恂
  - - に/氵 + 日 + す/発 = 洵
  - - い/糹/#2 + 日 + す/発 = 絢
  - - 心 + 日 + す/発 = 荀
  - - え/訁 + 日 + す/発 = 詢
- - 日 + 比 = 昆
  - - き/木 + 日 + 比 = 棍
  - - 火 + 日 + 比 = 焜
  - - ち/竹 + 日 + 比 = 箟
  - - 心 + 日 + 比 = 菎
  - - せ/食 + 日 + 比 = 鯤
- - 日 + く/艹 = 昇
- - 日 + ら/月 = 明
  - - 日 + ⺼ = 盟
  - - く/艹 + 日 + ら/月 = 萌
- - 日 + ん/止 = 昏
  - - き/木 + 日 + ん/止 = 棔
- - 日 + 数 = 易
  - - ぬ/力 + 日 + 数 = 剔
  - - む/車 + 日 + 数 = 蜴
  - - ね/示 + 日 + 数 = 裼
  - - せ/食 + 日 + 数 = 鯣
- - 日 + ね/示 = 昔
  - - く/艹 + 日 + ね/示 = 藉
  - - せ/食 + 日 + ね/示 = 醋
- - 日 + い/糹/#2 = 星
  - - る/忄 + 日 + い/糹/#2 = 惺
  - - け/犬 + 日 + い/糹/#2 = 猩
  - - ⺼ + 日 + い/糹/#2 = 腥
  - - せ/食 + 日 + い/糹/#2 = 醒
- - 日 + お/頁 = 映
- - 日 + さ/阝 = 昨
- - 日 + ぬ/力 = 昭
  - - 日 + 火 = 照
- - 日 + よ/广 = 是
  - - う/宀/#3 + 日 + よ/广 = 寔
  - - せ/食 + 日 + よ/广 = 醍
- - 日 + し/巿 = 時
  - - つ/土 + 日 + し/巿 = 塒
  - - く/艹 + 日 + し/巿 = 蒔
- - 日 + ひ/辶 = 晋
  - - 日 + 日 + ひ/辶 = 晉
  - - い/糹/#2 + 日 + ひ/辶 = 縉
- - 日 + に/氵 = 晒
- - 日 + は/辶 = 晦
- - 日 + 宿 = 晩
- - 日 + れ/口 = 景
  - - る/忄 + 日 + れ/口 = 憬
- - 日 + せ/食 = 晴
- - 日 + 龸 = 晶
  - - き/木 + 日 + 龸 = 橸
- - 日 + つ/土 = 暁
  - - 日 + 日 + つ/土 = 曉
- - 日 + の/禾 = 暇
- - 日 + 仁/亻 = 暖
- - 日 + む/車 = 暫
- - 日 + こ/子 = 暴
  - - 日 + 日 + こ/子 = 曝
  - - に/氵 + 日 + こ/子 = 瀑
- - 日 + ち/竹 = 曇
  - - つ/土 + 日 + ち/竹 = 壜
  - - ん/止 + 日 + ち/竹 = 罎
- - 日 + ほ/方 = 曙
- - 日 + や/疒 = 曜
- - 日 + ぬ/力 + そ/馬 = 勗
- - 日 + 宿 + ひ/辶 = 匙
- - つ/土 + 宿 + 日 = 堵
- - て/扌 + 宿 + 日 = 搨
- - 日 + 数 + お/頁 = 旭
- - 日 + selector 4 + か/金 = 旱
- - 日 + 龸 + selector 3 = 旻
- - 日 + 宿 + さ/阝 = 昂
- - 日 + 仁/亻 + よ/广 = 昃
- - 日 + selector 1 + け/犬 = 昊
- - 日 + selector 4 + 数 = 昜
- - 日 + き/木 + selector 4 = 昧
- - 日 + さ/阝 + う/宀/#3 = 昴
- - 日 + と/戸 + 仁/亻 = 昵
- - 日 + 宿 + よ/广 = 昿
- - 日 + 数 + 宿 = 晁
- - 日 + 龸 + selector 2 = 晃
- - 日 + 宿 + 龸 = 晄
- - 日 + う/宀/#3 + ふ/女 = 晏
- - 日 + め/目 + し/巿 = 晞
- - 日 + せ/食 + ひ/辶 = 晟
- - 日 + て/扌 + を/貝 = 晢
- - 日 + ら/月 + れ/口 = 晤
- - 日 + こ/子 + く/艹 = 晧
- - 日 + selector 4 + ろ/十 = 晨
- - 日 + 宿 + お/頁 = 晰
- - 日 + selector 4 + 火 = 暃
- - 日 + 宿 + む/車 = 暈
- - 日 + 龸 + む/車 = 暉
- - 日 + く/艹 + お/頁 = 暎
- - 日 + 宿 + 数 = 暘
- - 日 + 龸 + ろ/十 = 暸
- - 日 + ひ/辶 + ひ/辶 = 暹
- - 日 + selector 3 + は/辶 = 暼
- - 日 + 宿 + 氷/氵 = 暾
- - 日 + く/艹 + か/金 = 曄
- - 日 + 龸 + selector 1 = 曖
- - 日 + 宿 + そ/馬 = 曚
- - 日 + よ/广 + こ/子 = 曠
- - 日 + そ/馬 + 囗 = 曦
- - 日 + 宿 + み/耳 = 曩
- - 日 + 宿 + き/木 = 杲
- - き/木 + 龸 + 日 = 杳
- - 氷/氵 + 宿 + 日 = 汨
- - 火 + 宿 + 日 = 熾
- - ち/竹 + 宿 + 日 = 簪
- - ふ/女 + 宿 + 日 = 艪
- - ね/示 + 宿 + 日 = 衵
- - え/訁 + 龸 + 日 = 譖

==== Compounds of 旦 ====
- - な/亻 + 日 = 但
- - て/扌 + 日 = 担
  - - て/扌 + て/扌 + 日 = 擔
- - た/⽥ + 日 = 昼
  - - た/⽥ + た/⽥ + 日 = 晝
- - ⺼ + 日 = 胆
  - - ⺼ + ⺼ + 日 = 膽
- - ゆ/彳 + 日 = 得
- - 日 + り/分 = 量
- - き/木 + 日 = 査
  - - に/氵 + き/木 + 日 = 渣
- - つ/土 + selector 4 + 日 = 坦
- - ふ/女 + selector 4 + 日 = 妲
- - る/忄 + selector 4 + 日 = 怛
- - や/疒 + selector 4 + 日 = 疸
- - ね/示 + selector 4 + 日 = 袒
- - と/戸 + selector 4 + 日 = 靼
- - る/忄 + 宿 + 日 = 憺
- - 日 + や/疒 + 仁/亻 = 曁
- - き/木 + う/宀/#3 + 日 = 檐
- - き/木 + 宿 + 日 = 櫓
- - に/氵 + 宿 + 日 = 澹
- - め/目 + 宿 + 日 = 瞻
- - ち/竹 + 龸 + 日 = 簷
- - む/車 + 宿 + 日 = 蟾
- - え/訁 + 宿 + 日 = 譫
- - を/貝 + 宿 + 日 = 贍

==== Compounds of 亘 ====
- - つ/土 + 日 = 垣
- - う/宀/#3 + 日 = 宣
  - - れ/口 + う/宀/#3 + 日 = 喧
  - - る/忄 + う/宀/#3 + 日 = 愃
  - - 日 + う/宀/#3 + 日 = 暄
  - - 心 + う/宀/#3 + 日 = 萱
  - - え/訁 + う/宀/#3 + 日 = 諠
- - る/忄 + 日 = 恒
  - - る/忄 + る/忄 + 日 = 恆
- - き/木 + selector 5 + 日 = 桓

==== Compounds of 白 ====
- - 仁/亻 + 日 = 伯
- - 心 + 日 = 柏
- - 氷/氵 + 日 = 泊
  - - ち/竹 + 氷/氵 + 日 = 箔
- - ふ/女 + 日 = 舶
- - ひ/辶 + 日 = 迫
  - - ひ/辶 + 日 + へ/⺩ = 遑
- - せ/食 + 日 = 魯
- - 日 + て/扌 = 拍
- - 日 + ゐ/幺 = 楽
  - - 日 + 日 + ゐ/幺 = 樂
    - - て/扌 + 日 + ゐ/幺 = 擽
    - - 火 + 日 + ゐ/幺 = 爍
    - - ま/石 + 日 + ゐ/幺 = 礫
    - - む/車 + 日 + ゐ/幺 = 轢
    - - か/金 + 日 + ゐ/幺 = 鑠
  - - 心 + 日 + ゐ/幺 = 檪
- - 日 + 氷/氵 = 泉
  - - き/木 + 日 + 氷/氵 = 楾
  - - に/氵 + 日 + 氷/氵 = 湶
  - - ⺼ + 日 + 氷/氵 = 腺
  - - 日 + 氷/氵 + selector 4 = 昶
- - 日 + た/⽥ = 畠
- - 日 + も/門 = 的
- - 日 + へ/⺩ = 皇
  - - む/車 + 日 + へ/⺩ = 凰
  - - ゆ/彳 + 日 + へ/⺩ = 徨
  - - る/忄 + 日 + へ/⺩ = 惶
  - - に/氵 + 日 + へ/⺩ = 湟
  - - 火 + 日 + へ/⺩ = 煌
  - - ち/竹 + 日 + へ/⺩ = 篁
  - - か/金 + 日 + へ/⺩ = 鍠
  - - さ/阝 + 日 + へ/⺩ = 隍
  - - せ/食 + 日 + へ/⺩ = 鰉
  - - 日 + へ/⺩ + selector 1 = 旺
- - 比 + 日 = 皆
  - - さ/阝 + 日 = 階
  - - な/亻 + 比 + 日 = 偕
  - - て/扌 + 比 + 日 = 揩
  - - き/木 + 比 + 日 = 楷
  - - え/訁 + 比 + 日 = 諧
- - む/車 + 日 = 習
  - - る/忄 + む/車 + 日 = 慴
  - - て/扌 + む/車 + 日 = 摺
  - - ね/示 + む/車 + 日 = 褶
- - そ/馬 + 日 = 貌
  - - く/艹 + そ/馬 + 日 = 藐
- - し/巿 + 日 + selector 1 = 帛
- - る/忄 + 日 + selector 1 = 怕
- - き/木 + 日 + selector 1 = 槹
- - け/犬 + 日 + selector 1 = 狛
- - へ/⺩ + 日 + selector 1 = 珀
- - ひ/辶 + 日 + selector 1 = 皀
- - 宿 + 日 + selector 1 = 皃
- - や/疒 + 日 + selector 1 = 皚
- - の/禾 + 日 + selector 1 = 粕
- - く/艹 + 日 + selector 1 = 葩
- - ね/示 + 日 + selector 1 = 袙
- - や/疒 + う/宀/#3 + 日 = 岶
- - 心 + 宿 + 日 = 櫟
- - 日 + は/辶 + ん/止 = 皈
- - 日 + き/木 + selector 6 = 皋
- - 日 + 龸 + ち/竹 = 皎
- - 日 + 宿 + ろ/十 = 皐
- - 日 + 宿 + こ/子 = 皓
- - 日 + う/宀/#3 + 宿 = 皖
- - 日 + き/木 + お/頁 = 皙
- - 日 + お/頁 + に/氵 = 魄

==== Compounds of 旧 ====
- - 日 + 日 + selector 4 = 舊

==== Compounds of 曰 ====
- - 日 + な/亻 = 更
  - - れ/口 + 日 + な/亻 = 哽
  - - や/疒 + 日 + な/亻 = 峺
  - - 心 + 日 + な/亻 = 梗
  - - の/禾 + 日 + な/亻 = 粳
- - 日 + め/目 = 冒
  - - へ/⺩ + 日 + め/目 = 瑁
- - 日 + ふ/女 = 書
- - 日 + け/犬 = 替
  - - な/亻 + 日 + け/犬 = 僣
  - - 仁/亻 + 日 + け/犬 = 僭
  - - え/訁 + 日 + け/犬 = 譛
- - 日 + ゑ/訁 = 最
  - - き/木 + 日 + ゑ/訁 = 樶
- - に/氵 + 日 + selector 6 = 沓
- - 日 + 宿 + め/目 = 冐
- - 日 + ぬ/力 + 宿 = 冕

==== Other compounds ====
- - ね/示 + 日 = 衿
- - か/金 + 日 = 鈴
- - 日 + か/金 = 年
- - 日 + そ/馬 = 秒
- - 日 + を/貝 = 頃
  - - に/氵 + 日 + を/貝 = 潁
- - め/目 + 日 = 瞼
- - さ/阝 + 日 + く/艹 = 陞
- - か/金 + う/宀/#3 + 日 = 瓰
