= Braille pattern dots-26 =

Braille pattern

6-dot braille cells
| ⠀ | ⠁ | ⠃ | ⠉ | ⠙ | ⠑ | ⠋ | ⠛ | ⠓ | ⠊ | ⠚ | ⠈ | ⠘ |
| ⠄ | ⠅ | ⠇ | ⠍ | ⠝ | ⠕ | ⠏ | ⠟ | ⠗ | ⠎ | ⠞ | ⠌ | ⠜ |
| ⠤ | ⠥ | ⠧ | ⠭ | ⠽ | ⠵ | ⠯ | ⠿ | ⠷ | ⠮ | ⠾ | ⠬ | ⠼ |
| ⠠ | ⠡ | ⠣ | ⠩ | ⠹ | ⠱ | ⠫ | ⠻ | ⠳ | ⠪ | ⠺ | ⠨ | ⠸ |
| shift down | ⠂ | ⠆ | ⠒ | ⠲ | ⠢ | ⠖ | ⠶ | ⠦ | ⠔ | ⠴ | ⠐ | ⠰ |

The Braille pattern dots-26 ( ⠢ ) is a 6-dot braille cell with the middle left and bottom right dots raised, or an 8-dot braille cell with the upper-middle left and lower-middle right dots raised. It is represented by the Unicode code point U+2822, and in Braille ASCII with the number 5.

Character information
| Preview | ⠢ (braille pattern dots-26) | |
|---|---|---|
| Unicode name | BRAILLE PATTERN DOTS-26 | |
| Encodings | decimal | hex |
| Unicode | 10274 | U+2822 |
| UTF-8 | 226 160 162 | E2 A0 A2 |
| Numeric character reference | &#10274; | &#x2822; |
| Braille ASCII | 53 | 35 |

== Unified Braille ==
In unified international braille, the braille pattern dots-26 is used to represent an unrounded open-mid to close-mid front vowel, such as /e/, /e̞/, or /ɛ/ when multiple letters correspond to these values, a question mark, or is otherwise assigned as needed.

=== Table of unified braille values ===
| French Braille | ? (question mark), mathematical subscript mark, en |
| English Braille | en |
| English Contraction | enough |
| German Braille | or |
| Bharati Braille | ऎ / য় / ୟ / ఎ / ಎ / എ / எ / ඒ |
| Icelandic Braille | ? (question mark) |
| IPA Braille | /ə/ |
| Russian Braille | ? (question mark) |
| Slovak Braille | ? (question mark) |
| Irish Braille | en |
| Thai Braille | ื e͞u |

== Other braille ==
| Japanese Braille | -w- (gō-yōon |
| Korean Braille | -m / ㅁ |
| Mainland Chinese Braille | e/o |
| Taiwanese Braille | ê / ㄝ |
| Two-Cell Chinese Braille | w- |
| Nemeth Braille | 5 |
| Gardner Salinas Braille | subscript mark |

== Plus dots 7 and 8 ==
Related to Braille pattern dots-26 are Braille patterns 267, 268, and 2678, which are used in 8-dot braille systems, such as Gardner-Salinas and Luxembourgish Braille.

Character information
| Preview | ⡢ (braille pattern dots-267) | | ⢢ (braille pattern dots-268) | | ⣢ (braille pattern dots-2678) | |
|---|---|---|---|---|---|---|
| Unicode name | BRAILLE PATTERN DOTS-267 | | BRAILLE PATTERN DOTS-268 | | BRAILLE PATTERN DOTS-2678 | |
| Encodings | decimal | hex | dec | hex | dec | hex |
| Unicode | 10338 | U+2862 | 10402 | U+28A2 | 10466 | U+28E2 |
| UTF-8 | 226 161 162 | E2 A1 A2 | 226 162 162 | E2 A2 A2 | 226 163 162 | E2 A3 A2 |
| Numeric character reference | &#10338; | &#x2862; | &#10402; | &#x28A2; | &#10466; | &#x28E2; |

| | dots 267 | dots 268 | dots 2678 |
|---|---|---|---|
| Gardner Salinas Braille | > (greater than sign) | | left subscript |

== Related 8-dot kantenji patterns ==
In the Japanese kantenji braille, the standard 8-dot Braille patterns 38, 138, 348, and 1348 are the patterns related to Braille pattern dots-26, since the two additional dots of kantenji patterns 026, 267, and 0267 are placed above the base 6-dot cell, instead of below, as in standard 8-dot braille.

Character information
| Preview | ⢄ (braille pattern dots-38) | | ⢅ (braille pattern dots-138) | | ⢌ (braille pattern dots-348) | | ⢍ (braille pattern dots-1348) | |
|---|---|---|---|---|---|---|---|---|
| Unicode name | BRAILLE PATTERN DOTS-38 | | BRAILLE PATTERN DOTS-138 | | BRAILLE PATTERN DOTS-348 | | BRAILLE PATTERN DOTS-1348 | |
| Encodings | decimal | hex | dec | hex | dec | hex | dec | hex |
| Unicode | 10372 | U+2884 | 10373 | U+2885 | 10380 | U+288C | 10381 | U+288D |
| UTF-8 | 226 162 132 | E2 A2 84 | 226 162 133 | E2 A2 85 | 226 162 140 | E2 A2 8C | 226 162 141 | E2 A2 8D |
| Numeric character reference | &#10372; | &#x2884; | &#10373; | &#x2885; | &#10380; | &#x288C; | &#10381; | &#x288D; |

=== Kantenji using braille patterns 38, 138, 348, or 1348 ===
This listing includes kantenji using Braille pattern dots-26 for all 6349 kanji found in JIS C 6226-1978.

- - 肉

==== Variants and thematic compounds ====
- - selector 1 + ⺼ = 血
- - selector 4 + ⺼ = 皿
- - selector 5 + ⺼ = 奐
- - selector 6 + ⺼ = 孟
- - ⺼ + selector 2 = 臍
- - 比 + ⺼ = 互

==== Compounds of 肉 and ⺼ ====
- - よ/广 + ⺼ = 腐
- - ろ/十 + ⺼ = 朝
  - - 囗 + ⺼ = 嘲
  - - よ/广 + ろ/十 + ⺼ = 廟
- - き/木 + ⺼ = 棚
- - ⺼ + ろ/十 = 肋
  - - ち/竹 + ⺼ = 筋
- - そ/馬 + ⺼ = 肖
  - - ま/石 + ⺼ = 硝
  - - む/車 + ⺼ = 蛸
  - - ⺼ + ぬ/力 = 削
  - - や/疒 + そ/馬 + ⺼ = 峭
  - - る/忄 + そ/馬 + ⺼ = 悄
  - - き/木 + そ/馬 + ⺼ = 梢
  - - の/禾 + そ/馬 + ⺼ = 稍
  - - え/訁 + そ/馬 + ⺼ = 誚
  - - は/辶 + そ/馬 + ⺼ = 趙
  - - ひ/辶 + そ/馬 + ⺼ = 逍
  - - か/金 + そ/馬 + ⺼ = 銷
  - - ち/竹 + そ/馬 + ⺼ = 霄
  - - と/戸 + そ/馬 + ⺼ = 鞘
  - - せ/食 + そ/馬 + ⺼ = 鮹
- - と/戸 + ⺼ = 肩
- - め/目 + ⺼ = 肴
  - - に/氵 + め/目 + ⺼ = 淆
- - た/⽥ + ⺼ = 胃
  - - え/訁 + ⺼ = 謂
  - - れ/口 + た/⽥ + ⺼ = 喟
  - - に/氵 + た/⽥ + ⺼ = 渭
  - - む/車 + た/⽥ + ⺼ = 蝟
- - ⺼ + 龸 = 肌
- - ⺼ + 比 = 肘
- - ⺼ + か/金 = 肝
- - ⺼ + の/禾 = 股
- - ⺼ + は/辶 = 肢
- - ⺼ + ひ/辶 = 肥
- - ⺼ + ほ/方 = 肪
- - ⺼ + し/巿 = 肺
- - ⺼ + 日 = 胆
  - - ⺼ + ⺼ + 日 = 膽
- - ⺼ + き/木 = 背
- - ⺼ + な/亻 = 胎
- - ⺼ + い/糹/#2 = 胤
- - ⺼ + と/戸 = 胴
- - ⺼ + も/門 = 胸
- - ⺼ + に/氵 = 脂
- - ⺼ + ね/示 = 脇
- - ⺼ + み/耳 = 脈
- - ⺼ + 仁/亻 = 脊
  - - や/疒 + ⺼ + 仁/亻 = 瘠
  - - み/耳 + ⺼ + 仁/亻 = 蹐
- - ⺼ + さ/阝 = 脚
- - ⺼ + け/犬 = 脛
- - ⺼ + 宿 = 脱
- - ⺼ + ち/竹 = 脳
  - - ⺼ + ⺼ + ち/竹 = 腦
- - ⺼ + た/⽥ = 脾
- - ⺼ + ゑ/訁 = 腎
- - ⺼ + う/宀/#3 = 腕
- - ⺼ + ふ/女 = 腰
- - ⺼ + 数 = 腸
  - - ⺼ + ⺼ + 数 = 膓
- - ⺼ + す/発 = 腹
- - ⺼ + 囗 = 膈
- - ⺼ + え/訁 = 膏
- - ⺼ + く/艹 = 膜
- - ⺼ + 氷/氵 = 膝
- - ⺼ + む/車 = 膠
- - ⺼ + れ/口 = 膳
- - ⺼ + お/頁 = 膵
- - ⺼ + よ/广 = 膺
- - ⺼ + こ/子 = 臀
- - ⺼ + ま/石 = 臂
- - ⺼ + ら/月 = 髄
  - - ⺼ + ⺼ + ら/月 = 膸
- - ⺼ + 宿 + そ/馬 = 羸
- - ⺼ + selector 5 + ほ/方 = 肓
- - ⺼ + 宿 + つ/土 = 肚
- - ⺼ + こ/子 + selector 1 = 肛
- - ⺼ + selector 6 + 仁/亻 = 肬
- - ⺼ + 囗 + 仁/亻 = 肭
- - ⺼ + 宿 + ろ/十 = 肱
- - ⺼ + ろ/十 + は/辶 = 胖
- - ⺼ + 宿 + さ/阝 = 胙
- - ⺼ + selector 4 + ふ/女 = 胚
- - ⺼ + 数 + こ/子 = 胛
- - ⺼ + selector 1 + ん/止 = 胝
- - ⺼ + 宿 + よ/广 = 胥
- - ⺼ + 宿 + け/犬 = 胯
- - ⺼ + 龸 + selector 2 = 胱
- - ⺼ + 宿 + と/戸 = 胼
- - ⺼ + く/艹 + さ/阝 = 脆
- - ⺼ + 氷/氵 + selector 4 = 脉
- - ⺼ + selector 4 + ろ/十 = 脣
- - ⺼ + 仁/亻 + ゆ/彳 = 脩
- - ⺼ + selector 6 + ほ/方 = 脯
- - ⺼ + た/⽥ + り/分 = 腆
- - ⺼ + 龸 + な/亻 = 腋
- - ⺼ + selector 4 + 火 = 腓
- - ⺼ + う/宀/#3 + き/木 = 腔
- - ⺼ + う/宀/#3 + ゆ/彳 = 腟
- - ⺼ + 日 + い/糹/#2 = 腥
- - ⺼ + 龸 + り/分 = 腫
- - ⺼ + た/⽥ + 心 = 腮
- - ⺼ + は/辶 + ふ/女 = 腱
- - ⺼ + selector 3 + ゆ/彳 = 腴
- - ⺼ + 日 + 氷/氵 = 腺
- - ⺼ + ひ/辶 + や/疒 = 腿
- - ⺼ + 宿 + ほ/方 = 膀
- - ⺼ + ほ/方 + ゆ/彳 = 膂
- - ⺼ + 宿 + て/扌 = 膊
- - ⺼ + 囗 + へ/⺩ = 膕
- - ⺼ + 宿 + ゆ/彳 = 膣
- - ⺼ + ち/竹 + せ/食 = 膤
- - ⺼ + 囗 + い/糹/#2 = 膩
- - ⺼ + の/禾 + た/⽥ = 膰
- - ⺼ + り/分 + え/訁 = 膾
- - ⺼ + た/⽥ + ろ/十 = 膿
- - ⺼ + 宿 + り/分 = 臉
- - ⺼ + ち/竹 + の/禾 = 臑
- - ⺼ + 囗 + け/犬 = 臙
- - ⺼ + 宿 + た/⽥ = 臚
- - え/訁 + 宿 + ⺼ = 臠
- - ⺼ + 宿 + を/貝 = 贏
- - ⺼ + 宿 + ら/月 = 髓
- - ⺼ + し/巿 + く/艹 = 黶

==== Compounds of 血 ====
- - る/忄 + ⺼ = 恤
- - ⺼ + そ/馬 = 衆
  - - せ/食 + ⺼ + そ/馬 = 鰥
- - に/氵 + selector 1 + ⺼ = 洫
- - ぬ/力 + selector 1 + ⺼ = 衂
- - そ/馬 + selector 1 + ⺼ = 衄

==== Compounds of 皿 ====
- - つ/土 + ⺼ = 塩
  - - つ/土 + つ/土 + ⺼ = 鹽
- - に/氵 + ⺼ = 温
  - - 心 + に/氵 + ⺼ = 薀
- - ぬ/力 + ⺼ = 盆
- - り/分 + ⺼ = 益
  - - い/糹/#2 + ⺼ = 縊
  - - さ/阝 + ⺼ = 隘
  - - え/訁 + り/分 + ⺼ = 謚
  - - か/金 + り/分 + ⺼ = 鎰
- - ん/止 + ⺼ = 盗
  - - ん/止 + ん/止 + ⺼ = 盜
- - せ/食 + ⺼ = 盛
- - 日 + ⺼ = 盟
- - す/発 + ⺼ = 監
  - - 氷/氵 + ⺼ = 濫
  - - ふ/女 + ⺼ = 艦
  - - 心 + ⺼ = 藍
  - - か/金 + ⺼ = 鑑
    - - か/金 + か/金 + ⺼ = 鑒
  - - な/亻 + す/発 + ⺼ = 儖
  - - き/木 + す/発 + ⺼ = 檻
  - - ち/竹 + す/発 + ⺼ = 籃
  - - い/糹/#2 + す/発 + ⺼ = 繿
  - - ね/示 + す/発 + ⺼ = 襤
- - の/禾 + ⺼ = 盤
- - く/艹 + ⺼ = 蘊
- - ふ/女 + selector 4 + ⺼ = 盃
- - る/忄 + 宿 + ⺼ = 慍
- - き/木 + 宿 + ⺼ = 楹
- - 心 + 宿 + ⺼ = 榲
- - や/疒 + 宿 + ⺼ = 瘟
- - か/金 + 宿 + ⺼ = 盂
- - ゐ/幺 + 宿 + ⺼ = 盈
- - つ/土 + 宿 + ⺼ = 盍
- - ⺼ + り/分 + 囗 = 盒
- - 囗 + 宿 + ⺼ = 盞
- - に/氵 + 宿 + ⺼ = 盥
- - ⺼ + に/氵 + 数 = 盪
- - ⺼ + 宿 + ⺼ = 膃
- - む/車 + 宿 + ⺼ = 蠱
- - ね/示 + 宿 + ⺼ = 褞
- - せ/食 + 宿 + ⺼ = 饂
- - せ/食 + 龸 + ⺼ = 鰛
- - せ/食 + う/宀/#3 + ⺼ = 鰮

==== Compounds of 奐 ====
- - れ/口 + ⺼ = 喚
- - て/扌 + ⺼ = 換
- - 火 + ⺼ = 煥
- - に/氵 + 龸 + ⺼ = 渙

==== Compounds of 孟 ====
- - け/犬 + ⺼ = 猛

==== Compounds of 互 ====
- - 氷/氵 + 比 + ⺼ = 冱
- - に/氵 + 比 + ⺼ = 沍
- - た/⽥ + 比 + ⺼ = 疉

==== Other compounds ====
- - し/巿 + ⺼ = 帥
- - ⺼ + つ/土 = 爪
  - - て/扌 + ⺼ + つ/土 = 抓
  - - ひ/辶 + ⺼ + つ/土 = 爬
  - - ち/竹 + ⺼ + つ/土 = 笊
