= 1829 braille =

Louis Braille's original braille alphabet

Braille (first edition)
- Script type: Alphabet
- Period: 1824-c. 1837
- Direction: Left-to-right
- Languages: French

Related scripts
- Parent systems: Night Writing: Braille (first edition)
- Child systems: modern French Braille

Unicode
- Unicode range: (not supported)

Louis Braille's original publication, Procedure for Writing Words, Music, and Plainsong in Dots (1829), credits Barbier's night writing as being the basis for the braille script. It differed in a fundamental way from modern braille: It contained nine decades (series) of characters rather than the modern five, utilizing dashes as well as dots. Braille recognized, however, that the dashes were problematic, being difficult to distinguish from the dots in practice, and those characters were abandoned in the second edition of the book.

The first four decades indicated the 40 letters of the alphabet (39 letters of the French alphabet, plus English w); the fifth the digits; the sixth punctuation; and the seventh and part of the eighth mathematical symbols. The seventh decade was also used for musical notes. Most of the remaining characters were unassigned.

== Script ==
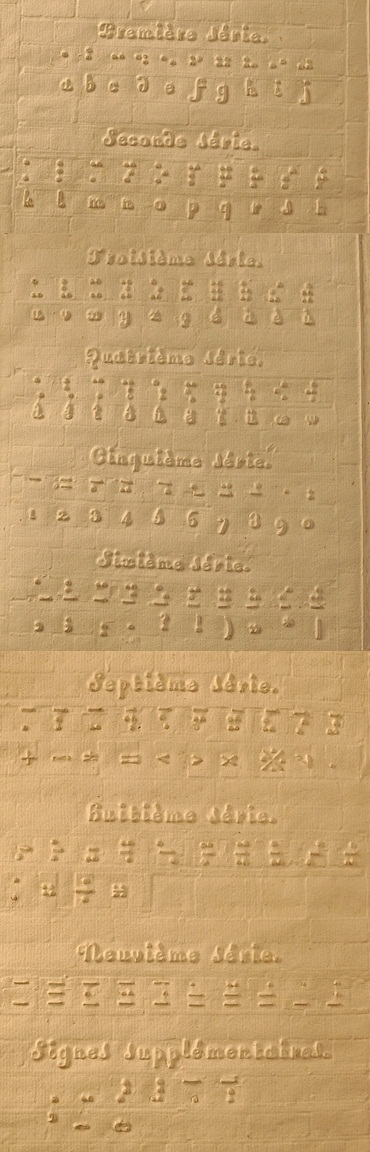
The character tables of Braille's 1829 publication.

As in modern braille, most of the higher decades were derived from the first:

- Decades 1–4 were the same as today and had their modern French values.
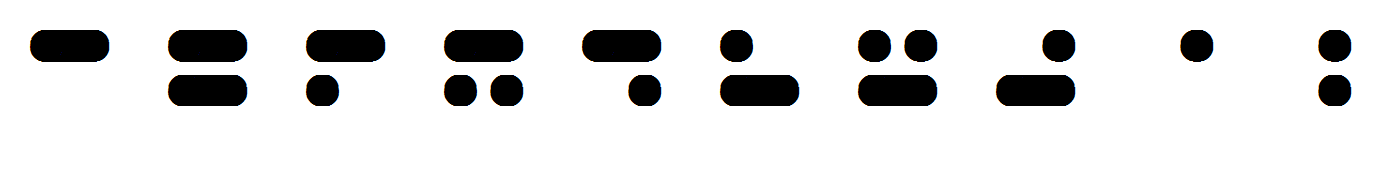
- Decade 5 was not derived from the first. (See image at left or table below.) Like the first decade, only the top half of the cell was used. The digit 1 was a dash in the top row; 2 was dashes in the top and mid rows. (That is, these were a and b, or modern digits 1 and 2, but with dashes in place of dots.) 3–5 were a top dash with a left, double, and right dot in the middle; 6–8 were a mid dash with a left, double, and right dot at top. 9 and 0 were a and b shifted to the right (that is, the modern French superscript and currency signs, ⠈ and ⠘):
- Decade 6 was derived from the first by adding dash at the bottom. That is, it resembled the 3rd decade with the two bottom dots connected into a line.
- Decade 7 was formed with a dash in the top row of the cell, displacing the dots of the first decade downward. That is, it was much like the modern fifth decade with an overstruck dash at the top. For the 1st and 3rd characters of the decade, however, the dots were shifted all the way down to the bottom row, rather than shifted once to the middle as in the modern 5th decade: No character outside the original 1st and 5th decades occupied just the top half of the cell.
- Decade 8 was formed by splitting the first decade with a dash, placing it between the upper and lower parts of each sign. That is, a dash appeared in the middle row, displacing the dots of that row to the bottom of the cell. In the case of first and 3rd characters (from a and c), which did not have dots in the middle row, the dots at the top were displaced to the bottom instead. That is, this decade was equivalent to adding an overstrike to ⠄⠅⠤⠩⠡⠍⠭⠥⠌⠬.
- Decade 9 was derived from the fifth (the digits) by adding a dash in the bottom row. These were left unassigned apart from the first three, which were used when needed as markers of words, music, and plainsong, respectively.

Thus the 1st and 5th decades occupied only the top half of the cell, while all characters in the other decades had a dot or dash in the bottom row.

=== Table ===
1829 Braille cells
Decade	numeric sequence									
I	a	b	c	d	e	f	g	h	i	j
II	k	l	m	n	o	p	q	r	s	t
III	u	v	x	y	z	ç	é	à	è	ù
IV	â	ê	î	ô	û	ë	ï	ü	œ	w
V	1	2	3	4	5	6	7	8	9	0
VI	,	;	:	.	?	!	( )	« »	*	|
VII	+	−	±	=	<	>	×	※	²√	.
VIII	:	∷	÷	∺	(braille pattern dots-B16)	(braille pattern dots-B134)	(braille pattern dots-B1346)	(braille pattern dots-B136)	(braille pattern dots-B34)	(braille pattern dots-B346)
IX	(braille pattern dots-AC0)	(braille pattern dots-ABC)	(braille pattern dots-AC2)	(braille pattern dots-AC25)	(braille pattern dots-AC5)	(braille pattern dots-BC1)	(braille pattern dots-BC14)	(braille pattern dots-BC4)	(braille pattern dots-C4)	(braille pattern dots-C45)
Supp.	'	-	∝	⠸ (braille pattern dots-456)	(braille pattern dots-A6)	(braille pattern dots-A56)				

The supplemental signs were ⠄⠤⠜⠼ and a top dash with ⠠⠰. Of the 125 (5^{3}) possible patterns, 97 were used. The modern 5th decade and other supplemental signs do not appear in the 1829 version of braille, apart from ⠐ and ⠒ in plainsong notation.

Punctuation differed slightly from today, even accounting for the shift downward when the dash was dropped from the bottom row of the cell. ⠶ was used for both parentheses, as in modern English braille. ⠦ was used for either quotation mark; ⠴ was a pipe. ⠢ was the question mark, as in modern French braille, while ⠔ was the asterisk, which is used doubled in English braille.

=== Substitutions for the dash ===
Anticipating that the dashes might prove problematic, Braille provided that the supplemental sign ⠼ (now known as the number sign) would shift the decade by four. That is, adding it to the first four decades would produce substitutes for the fifth through eighth. Only its use to replace the old fifth decade has been retained; the old sixth decade survives as the modern fifth, with the dash removed and the dots shifted down to replace it. The original proposal was as follows:

Digraph substitutions for characters containing dashes
(5th)	⠼⠁ 1	⠼⠃ 2	⠼⠉ 3	⠼⠙ 4	⠼⠑ 5	⠼⠋ 6	⠼⠛ 7	⠼⠓ 8	⠼⠊ 9	⠼⠚ 0
(6th)	⠼⠅,	⠼⠇;	⠼⠍ :	⠼⠝.	⠼⠕ ?	⠼⠏ !	⠼⠟ ()	⠼⠗ «»	⠼⠎ *	⠼⠞ |
(7th)	⠼⠥ +	⠼⠧ −	⠼⠭ ±	⠼⠽ =	⠼⠵ <	⠼⠯ >	⠼⠿ ×	⠼⠷ ※ ♯	⠼⠮ ²√ ♭	⠼⠾. ♮
(8th)	⠼⠡ :	⠼⠣ ∷	⠼⠩ ÷	⠼⠹ ∺						

== Musical notation ==
The book allots a great deal of space to the representation of music. Instrumental notation was largely a one-to-one transcription of the system already in use for the blind. The durations of the notes and the accidentals, however, had to be replaced; for these the 7th decade was used, as shown in the table above.

A simplified system for plainsong was provided. The twelve notes are the twelve characters of the upper half of the cell (the first and fifth decades) which do not have dashes. By themselves (1st decade), they indicate half notes. Quarter notes are 2nd decade, dotted quarter notes 3rd, and eighth notes 4th. Dotted half notes are indicated by a dash below (6th decade), whole notes by a dash above (7th decade), and dotted whole notes by a mid dash (8th decade). The alto, bass, treble, and tenor clefs were indicated by the 5th–8th characters of the fifth decade. ⠐ is the sharp-note prefix, ⠒ the bass-note prefix, and the equivalent with a dash the natural prefix. ⠄⠤ are the repetition sign and 'star'.

== Shorthand ==
The book finishes with a proposal for braille shorthand, utilizing the first decade for vowels, and the fifth for consonants (without a voicing distinction). That is, Braille's shorthand used a 4-dot cell rather than the standard 6-dot cell, taking two-thirds the space of normal braille, and one-third the space of Barbier's night writing.

Braille shorthand
I	⠁ (braille pattern dots-1)	⠃ (braille pattern dots-12)	⠉ (braille pattern dots-14)	⠙ (braille pattern dots-145)	⠑ (braille pattern dots-15)	⠋ (braille pattern dots-124)	⠛ (braille pattern dots-1245)	⠓ (braille pattern dots-125)	⠊ (braille pattern dots-24)	⠚ (braille pattern dots-245)
I	a	é è	i	o	u ou	an	in un	on	eu	oi

V	(braille pattern dots-A0)	(braille pattern dots-AB0)	(braille pattern dots-A2)	(braille pattern dots-A25)	(braille pattern dots-A5)	(braille pattern dots-B1)	(braille pattern dots-B14)	(braille pattern dots-B4)	⠈ (braille pattern dots-4)	⠘ (braille pattern dots-45)
V	b p	d t	g q	j ch	v f	z s	l	m	n gn	r

== Second edition ==
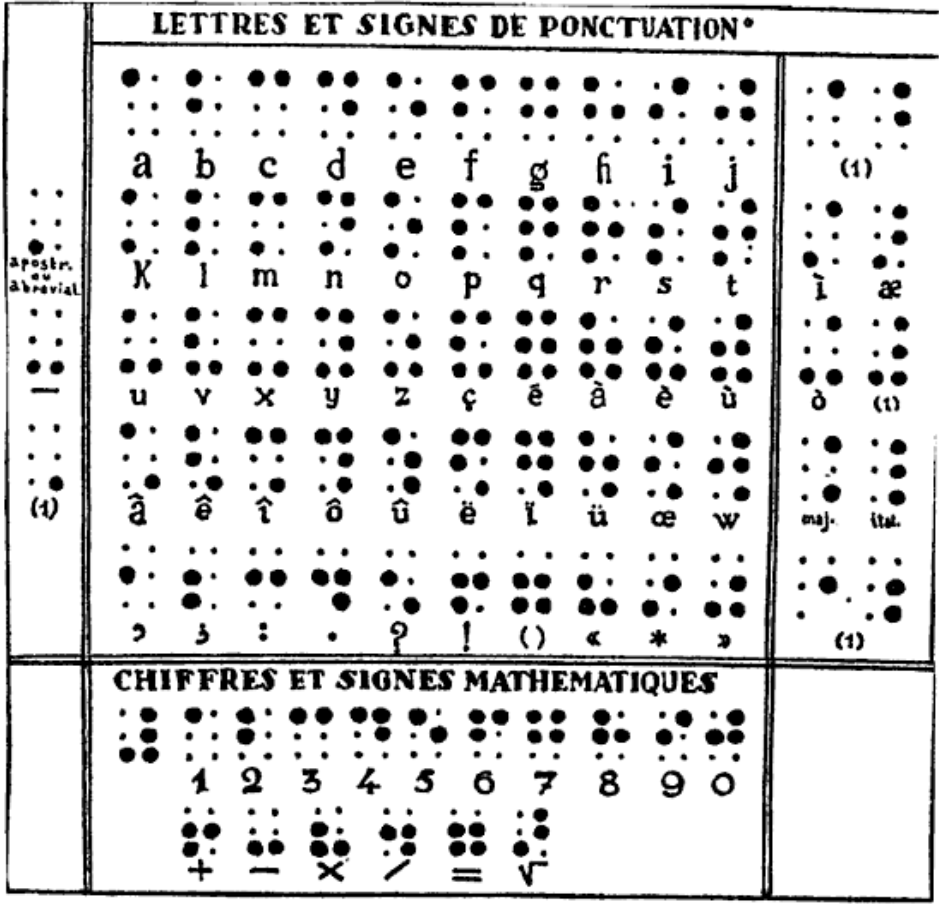
The final form of Braille's alphabet, according to Henri (1952). The decade diacritics are listed at left, and the supplementary letters are assigned to the appropriate decade at right. "(1)" indicates markers for musical and mathematical notation.

In the classroom, Braille's students found the characters with dashes to be impractical, as the dashes were not easily distinguishable from pairs of dots, and they were quickly abandoned. The second edition of the Procédé, published in 1837, sets out French Braille essentially as we know it today. According to Henri (1952), at right, the numerical sign was used with the new fifth decade, plus one of the supplementary characters, for mathematical notation: ⠼⠖ +, ⠼⠤ −, ⠼⠦ ×, ⠼⠲ /, ⠼⠶ =, ⠼⠜ √. Several of these values continue today in Antoine notation.

== Computer encoding ==
The official Unicode encoding for Braille only specifies codepoints for modern dot-only patterns. An unofficial encoding for dash patterns can be found in the Under-ConScript Unicode Registry, and as such may be found in some fonts that cover characters from that agreement. Together, these two blocks can represent all cell definitions from the 1829 Braille specification.

Braille Patterns^{[1]} Official Unicode Consortium code chart (PDF)
	0	1	2	3	4	5	6	7	8	9	A	B	C	D	E	F
U+280x	⠀	⠁	⠂	⠃	⠄	⠅	⠆	⠇	⠈	⠉	⠊	⠋	⠌	⠍	⠎	⠏
U+281x	⠐	⠑	⠒	⠓	⠔	⠕	⠖	⠗	⠘	⠙	⠚	⠛	⠜	⠝	⠞	⠟
U+282x	⠠	⠡	⠢	⠣	⠤	⠥	⠦	⠧	⠨	⠩	⠪	⠫	⠬	⠭	⠮	⠯
U+283x	⠰	⠱	⠲	⠳	⠴	⠵	⠶	⠷	⠸	⠹	⠺	⠻	⠼	⠽	⠾	⠿
(end of 6-dot cell patterns)
U+284x	⡀	⡁	⡂	⡃	⡄	⡅	⡆	⡇	⡈	⡉	⡊	⡋	⡌	⡍	⡎	⡏
U+285x	⡐	⡑	⡒	⡓	⡔	⡕	⡖	⡗	⡘	⡙	⡚	⡛	⡜	⡝	⡞	⡟
U+286x	⡠	⡡	⡢	⡣	⡤	⡥	⡦	⡧	⡨	⡩	⡪	⡫	⡬	⡭	⡮	⡯
U+287x	⡰	⡱	⡲	⡳	⡴	⡵	⡶	⡷	⡸	⡹	⡺	⡻	⡼	⡽	⡾	⡿
U+288x	⢀	⢁	⢂	⢃	⢄	⢅	⢆	⢇	⢈	⢉	⢊	⢋	⢌	⢍	⢎	⢏
U+289x	⢐	⢑	⢒	⢓	⢔	⢕	⢖	⢗	⢘	⢙	⢚	⢛	⢜	⢝	⢞	⢟
U+28Ax	⢠	⢡	⢢	⢣	⢤	⢥	⢦	⢧	⢨	⢩	⢪	⢫	⢬	⢭	⢮	⢯
U+28Bx	⢰	⢱	⢲	⢳	⢴	⢵	⢶	⢷	⢸	⢹	⢺	⢻	⢼	⢽	⢾	⢿
U+28Cx	⣀	⣁	⣂	⣃	⣄	⣅	⣆	⣇	⣈	⣉	⣊	⣋	⣌	⣍	⣎	⣏
U+28Dx	⣐	⣑	⣒	⣓	⣔	⣕	⣖	⣗	⣘	⣙	⣚	⣛	⣜	⣝	⣞	⣟
U+28Ex	⣠	⣡	⣢	⣣	⣤	⣥	⣦	⣧	⣨	⣩	⣪	⣫	⣬	⣭	⣮	⣯
U+28Fx	⣰	⣱	⣲	⣳	⣴	⣵	⣶	⣷	⣸	⣹	⣺	⣻	⣼	⣽	⣾	⣿
Notes 1.As of Unicode version 17.0

Braille Extended (Images)
	0	1	2	3	4	5	6	7	8	9	A	B	C	D	E	F
U+EB6x	(braille pattern dots-A0) (braille pattern dots-A0)	(braille pattern dots-A2) (braille pattern dots-A2)	(braille pattern dots-A3) (braille pattern dots-A3)	(braille pattern dots-A23) (braille pattern dots-A23)	(braille pattern dots-A5) (braille pattern dots-A5)	(braille pattern dots-A25) (braille pattern dots-A25)	(braille pattern dots-A35) (braille pattern dots-A35)	(braille pattern dots-A235) (braille pattern dots-A235)	(braille pattern dots-A6) (braille pattern dots-A6)	(braille pattern dots-A26) (braille pattern dots-A26)	(braille pattern dots-A36) (braille pattern dots-A36)	(braille pattern dots-A236) (braille pattern dots-A236)	(braille pattern dots-A56) (braille pattern dots-A56)	(braille pattern dots-A256) (braille pattern dots-A256)	(braille pattern dots-A356) (braille pattern dots-A356)	(braille pattern dots-A2356) (braille pattern dots-A2356)
U+EB7x	(braille pattern dots-B0) (braille pattern dots-B0)	(braille pattern dots-B1) (braille pattern dots-B1)	(braille pattern dots-B3) (braille pattern dots-B3)	(braille pattern dots-B13) (braille pattern dots-B13)	(braille pattern dots-B4) (braille pattern dots-B4)	(braille pattern dots-B14) (braille pattern dots-B14)	(braille pattern dots-B34) (braille pattern dots-B34)	(braille pattern dots-B134) (braille pattern dots-B134)	(braille pattern dots-B6) (braille pattern dots-B6)	(braille pattern dots-B16) (braille pattern dots-B16)	(braille pattern dots-B36) (braille pattern dots-B36)	(braille pattern dots-B136) (braille pattern dots-B136)	(braille pattern dots-B46) (braille pattern dots-B46)	(braille pattern dots-B146) (braille pattern dots-B146)	(braille pattern dots-B346) (braille pattern dots-B346)	(braille pattern dots-B1346) (braille pattern dots-B1346)
U+EB8x	(braille pattern dots-C0) (braille pattern dots-C0)	(braille pattern dots-C1) (braille pattern dots-C1)	(braille pattern dots-C2) (braille pattern dots-C2)	(braille pattern dots-C12) (braille pattern dots-C12)	(braille pattern dots-C4) (braille pattern dots-C4)	(braille pattern dots-C14) (braille pattern dots-C14)	(braille pattern dots-C24) (braille pattern dots-C24)	(braille pattern dots-C124) (braille pattern dots-C124)	(braille pattern dots-C5) (braille pattern dots-C5)	(braille pattern dots-C15) (braille pattern dots-C15)	(braille pattern dots-C25) (braille pattern dots-C25)	(braille pattern dots-C125) (braille pattern dots-C125)	(braille pattern dots-C45) (braille pattern dots-C45)	(braille pattern dots-C145) (braille pattern dots-C145)	(braille pattern dots-C245) (braille pattern dots-C245)	(braille pattern dots-C1245) (braille pattern dots-C1245)
U+EB9x	(braille pattern dots-AB0) (braille pattern dots-AB0)	(braille pattern dots-AB3) (braille pattern dots-AB3)	(braille pattern dots-AB6) (braille pattern dots-AB6)	(braille pattern dots-AB36) (braille pattern dots-AB36)	(braille pattern dots-AC0) (braille pattern dots-AC0)	(braille pattern dots-AC2) (braille pattern dots-AC2)	(braille pattern dots-AC5) (braille pattern dots-AC5)	(braille pattern dots-AC25) (braille pattern dots-AC25)	(braille pattern dots-BC0) (braille pattern dots-BC0)	(braille pattern dots-BC1) (braille pattern dots-BC1)	(braille pattern dots-BC4) (braille pattern dots-BC4)	(braille pattern dots-BC14) (braille pattern dots-BC14)	(braille pattern dots-ABC) (braille pattern dots-ABC)			
Notes Added to UCSUR 2020-04-28.

Braille Extended (Plain Text)
	0	1	2	3	4	5	6	7	8	9	A	B	C	D	E	F
U+EB6x																
U+EB7x																
U+EB8x																
U+EB9x																
Notes Added to UCSUR 2020-04-28.
