= Korean Braille =

Braille alphabet of the Korean language

Korean Braille ⠚⠒⠈⠮⠨⠎⠢⠨
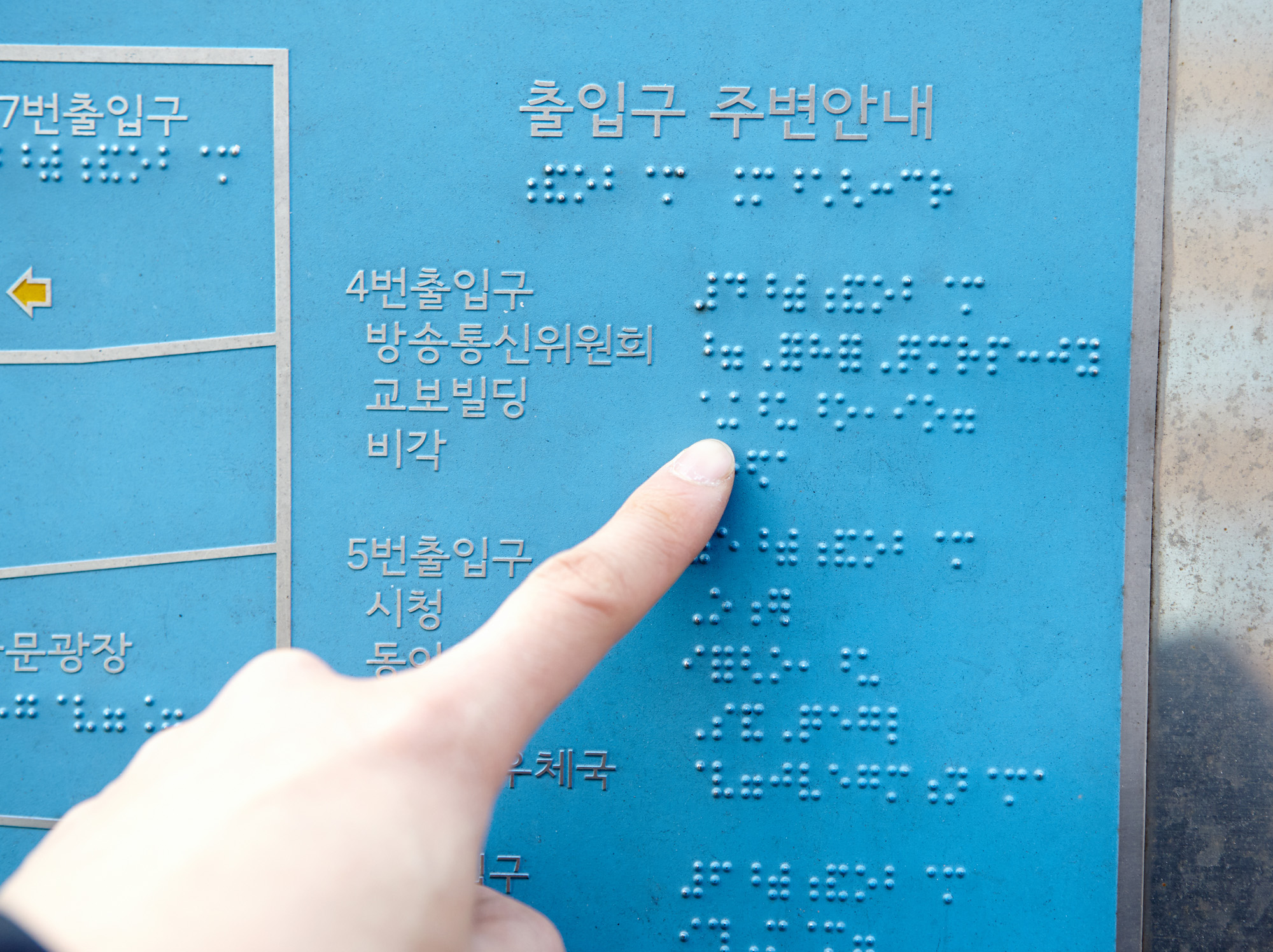
- Script type: Tactile alphabet , syllabically marked
- Print basis: Hangul
- Languages: Korean

Related scripts
- Parent systems: Night writing: Braille; Korean Braille

- Korean Braille
- Hangul: 한글 점자
- Hanja: 한글 點字
- RR: Hangeul jeomja
- MR: Han'gŭl chŏmcha

Korean Braille is the Braille alphabet of the Korean language. It is not graphically-related to other braille scripts found around the world. Instead, it reflects the patterns found in Hangul, and differentiates initial consonants, vowels, and final consonants.

== History ==
The first tactile encoding of Hangul was developed by Rosetta Sherwood Hall in 1897. It used a cell 4 dots wide by 2 dots high, like New York Point. 6-dot braille was adapted to Korean by Park Du-seong in 1926. There have since been a number of revisions. The current form was announced in 1994.

== Charts ==
It features characters for grammatical devices and punctuation. Numerals are similar to those of other braille systems.

=== Consonants ===
Consonants have different syllable-initial and -final variants, capturing some of the feel of hangul. The initial and final variants have the same shapes, but are shifted across the braille block. There are two patterns: The consonants that span the width of the block are shifted one space downward when final. Those that do not span the width of the block are on the right side of the block when initial, but on the left side when final. The sibilants ㅅ ㅈ ㅊ all have a bottom dot, while the other aspirated consonants, ㅋ ㅌ ㅍ ㅎ, all have angled forms.

No consonant occupies more than two rows.

roman	g	n	d	r	m	b	s	j	ch	k	t	p	h	ng
hangul	ㄱ	ㄴ	ㄷ	ㄹ	ㅁ	ㅂ	ㅅ	ㅈ	ㅊ	ㅋ	ㅌ	ㅍ	ㅎ	ㅇ
initial	⠈ (braille pattern dots-4)	⠉ (braille pattern dots-14)	⠊ (braille pattern dots-24)	⠐ (braille pattern dots-5)	⠑ (braille pattern dots-15)	⠘ (braille pattern dots-45)	⠠ (braille pattern dots-6)	⠨ (braille pattern dots-46)	⠰ (braille pattern dots-56)	⠋ (braille pattern dots-124)	⠓ (braille pattern dots-125)	⠙ (braille pattern dots-145)	⠚ (braille pattern dots-245)	*
initial	⠈	⠉	⠊	⠐	⠑	⠘	⠠	⠨	⠰	⠋	⠓	⠙	⠚	*
final	⠁ (braille pattern dots-1)	⠒ (braille pattern dots-25)	⠔ (braille pattern dots-35)	⠂ (braille pattern dots-2)	⠢ (braille pattern dots-26)	⠃ (braille pattern dots-12)	⠄ (braille pattern dots-3)	⠅ (braille pattern dots-13)	⠆ (braille pattern dots-23)	⠖ (braille pattern dots-235)	⠦ (braille pattern dots-236)	⠲ (braille pattern dots-256)	⠴ (braille pattern dots-356)	⠶ (braille pattern dots-2356)
final	⠁	⠒	⠔	⠂	⠢	⠃	⠄	⠅	⠆	⠖	⠦	⠲	⠴	⠶

*There is no initial version of ng. Initial ieung in hangul is not written in Korean Braille. However, the expected form is reserved and may not serve other basic uses, such as punctuation, but it is used in contractions (see below).

The heavy (double) consonants are written by prefixing an s, an old hangul convention. In initial position, they are:

⠠⠠ ㅆ ss
⠠⠈ ㄲ kk
⠠⠊ ㄸ tt
⠠⠘ ㅃ pp
⠠⠨ ㅉ jj

=== Vowels ===
All vowels span the width and height of the block. Because the consonants are specifically syllable-initial or syllable-final, a syllable that begins with a vowel causes no confusion when written without ieung.

The simpler vowels reflect the symmetries of hangul: the yin–yang pairs a, eo and o, u are related through inversion, and yotization of a, eo, o, u is indicated by reflecting the vowel. This creates a different pattern of symmetry than in hangul. The graphically-similar hangul letters i and eu are also related by reflection. The w in wa, wo is indicated by making the left side of the block solid (essentially a conflation of o and a for wa, and of u and eo for wo), while the i in ui, oe is shown by making the right side solid. However, the diphthongs e, ae and their yotized variants show no such patterns.

Four diphthongs are represented with two braille blocks, by adding ⠗ to the appropriate vowel for the final element -i.

roman	a	ya	eo	yeo	o	yo	u	yu	eu	i	e	ae	ye
hangul	ㅏ	ㅑ	ㅓ	ㅕ	ㅗ	ㅛ	ㅜ	ㅠ	ㅡ	ㅣ	ㅔ	ㅐ	ㅖ
braille	⠣ (braille pattern dots-126)	⠜ (braille pattern dots-345)	⠎ (braille pattern dots-234)	⠱ (braille pattern dots-156)	⠥ (braille pattern dots-136)	⠬ (braille pattern dots-346)	⠍ (braille pattern dots-134)	⠩ (braille pattern dots-146)	⠪ (braille pattern dots-246)	⠕ (braille pattern dots-135)	⠝ (braille pattern dots-1345)	⠗ (braille pattern dots-1235)	⠌ (braille pattern dots-34)
braille	⠣	⠜	⠎	⠱	⠥	⠬	⠍	⠩	⠪	⠕	⠝	⠗	⠌

roman	ui	wa	wo	oe	yae	wae	we	wi
hangul	ㅢ	ㅘ	ㅝ	ㅚ	ㅒ	ㅙ	ㅞ	ㅟ
braille	⠺ (braille pattern dots-2456)	⠧ (braille pattern dots-1236)	⠏ (braille pattern dots-1234)	⠽ (braille pattern dots-13456)	⠜ (braille pattern dots-345) ⠗ (braille pattern dots-1235)	⠧ (braille pattern dots-1236) ⠗ (braille pattern dots-1235)	⠏ (braille pattern dots-1234) ⠗ (braille pattern dots-1235)	⠍ (braille pattern dots-134) ⠗ (braille pattern dots-1235)
braille	⠺	⠧	⠏	⠽	⠜⠗	⠧⠗	⠏⠗	⠍⠗

=== Contractions ===
Korean Braille defines several cells as consonant-vowel or vowel-consonant sequences. These may be used alone as syllables or combined with another initial or final consonant for a longer syllable. Many are the braille cell for an initial consonant, with an assumed vowel "a" added. (For example, initial s- on its own is read sa, while initial s- followed by final -m is read sam.) Some make use of otherwise unused cells, while some are multi-cell abbreviations, often using malformed consonant clusters or consonant/vowel combinations otherwise abbreviated.

roman	ga	na	da	ma	ba	sa	ja	ka	ta	pa	ha	-ss	eog	ong
hangul	가	나	다	마	바	사	자	카	타	파	하	-ㅆ	억	옹
braille	⠫ (braille pattern dots-1246)	⠉ (braille pattern dots-14)	⠊ (braille pattern dots-24)	⠑ (braille pattern dots-15)	⠘ (braille pattern dots-45)	⠇ (braille pattern dots-123)	⠨ (braille pattern dots-46)	⠋ (braille pattern dots-124)	⠓ (braille pattern dots-125)	⠙ (braille pattern dots-145)	⠚ (braille pattern dots-245)	⠌ (braille pattern dots-34)	⠹ (braille pattern dots-1456)	⠿ (braille pattern dots-123456)
braille	⠫	⠉	⠊	⠑	⠘	⠇	⠨	⠋	⠓	⠙	⠚	⠌	⠹	⠿

roman	ul	og	yeon	un	on	eon	eol	yeol	in	yeong	eul	eun	geos
hangul	울	옥	연	운	온	언	얼	열	인	영	을	은	것
braille	⠯ (braille pattern dots-12346)	⠭ (braille pattern dots-1346)	⠡ (braille pattern dots-16)	⠛ (braille pattern dots-1245)	⠷ (braille pattern dots-12356)	⠾ (braille pattern dots-23456)	⠞ (braille pattern dots-2345)	⠳ (braille pattern dots-1256)	⠟ (braille pattern dots-12345)	⠻ (braille pattern dots-12456)	⠮ (braille pattern dots-2346)	⠵ (braille pattern dots-1356)	⠸ (braille pattern dots-456) ⠎ (braille pattern dots-234)
braille	⠯	⠭	⠡	⠛	⠷	⠾	⠞	⠳	⠟	⠻	⠮	⠵	⠸⠎

roman	geureona	geureomyeon	geuraeseo	geureonde	geureomeuro	geurigo	geurihayeo
hangul	그러나	그러면	그래서	그런데	그러므로	그리고	그리하여
braille	⠁ (braille pattern dots-1) ⠉ (braille pattern dots-14)	⠁ (braille pattern dots-1) ⠒ (braille pattern dots-25)	⠁ (braille pattern dots-1) ⠎ (braille pattern dots-234)	⠁ (braille pattern dots-1) ⠝ (braille pattern dots-1345)	⠁ (braille pattern dots-1) ⠢ (braille pattern dots-26)	⠁ (braille pattern dots-1) ⠥ (braille pattern dots-136)	⠁ (braille pattern dots-1) ⠱ (braille pattern dots-156)
braille	⠁⠉	⠁⠒	⠁⠎	⠁⠝	⠁⠢	⠁⠥	⠁⠱

=== Punctuation ===
print	,	;	:	.	?	!	“...”	‘...’	(...)
braille	⠐ (braille pattern dots-5)	⠰ (braille pattern dots-56) ⠆ (braille pattern dots-23)	⠐ (braille pattern dots-5) ⠂ (braille pattern dots-2)	⠲ (braille pattern dots-256)	⠦ (braille pattern dots-236)	⠖ (braille pattern dots-235)	...	...	...
braille	⠐	⠰⠆	⠐⠂	⠲	⠦	⠖	⠦...⠴	⠠⠦...⠴⠄	⠤...⠤

print	–	–	※	·	/	+	−	×	÷	=
braille	⠤ (braille pattern dots-36)	⠤ (braille pattern dots-36)	⠔ (braille pattern dots-35)	⠐ (braille pattern dots-5) ⠆ (braille pattern dots-23)	⠸ (braille pattern dots-456) ⠌ (braille pattern dots-34)	⠢ (braille pattern dots-26)	⠔ (braille pattern dots-35)	⠡ (braille pattern dots-16)	⠌ (braille pattern dots-34)	⠒ (braille pattern dots-25)
braille	⠤	⠤⠤	⠔⠔	⠐⠆	⠸⠌	⠢	⠔	⠡	⠌⠌	⠒⠒

== Formatting ==
print	(number)	(roman)
braille	⠼ (braille pattern dots-3456)	⠴ (braille pattern dots-356)
braille	⠼	⠴

As in most braille scripts, ⠼ is prefixed to digits, which are the same as in English Braille. ⠴ is prefixed to the 26 basic roman letters in the same way.

== Sources ==
- Korean Braille library (in Korean); chart is here
