= Braille pattern dots-5 =

Braille pattern

6-dot braille cells
⠀	⠁	⠃	⠉	⠙	⠑	⠋	⠛	⠓	⠊	⠚	⠈	⠘
⠄	⠅	⠇	⠍	⠝	⠕	⠏	⠟	⠗	⠎	⠞	⠌	⠜
⠤	⠥	⠧	⠭	⠽	⠵	⠯	⠿	⠷	⠮	⠾	⠬	⠼
⠠	⠡	⠣	⠩	⠹	⠱	⠫	⠻	⠳	⠪	⠺	⠨	⠸
shift down	⠂	⠆	⠒	⠲	⠢	⠖	⠶	⠦	⠔	⠴	⠐	⠰

The Braille pattern dots-5 ( ⠐ ) is a 6-dot braille cell with the middle right dot raised, or an 8-dot braille cell with the upper-middle right dot raised. It is represented by the Unicode code point U+2810, and in Braille ASCII with a quote mark: ".

Character information
Preview	⠐ (braille pattern dots-5)	
Unicode name	BRAILLE PATTERN DOTS-5	
Encodings	decimal	hex
Unicode	10256	U+2810
UTF-8	226 160 144	E2 A0 90
Numeric character reference	&#10256;	&#x2810;
Braille ASCII	34	22

== Unified Braille ==
In unified international braille, the braille pattern dots-5 is used as a formatting indicator, accent mark, or punctuation.

=== Table of unified braille values ===
French Braille	symbol mark, eu
English Braille	abbreviation sign
Bharati Braille	Urdu consonant modifier
IPA Braille	mid-script (overlap or other)
Arabic Braille	, (comma)

== Other braille ==
Japanese Braille	dakuten
Korean Braille	r- / ㄹ
Mainland Chinese Braille	, (comma)
Taiwanese Braille	tone 4
Two-Cell Chinese Braille	homophone discriminator
Nemeth Braille	"run over" indicator

== Plus dots 7 and 8 ==
Related to Braille pattern dots-5 are Braille patterns 57, 58, and 578, which are used in 8-dot braille systems, such as Gardner-Salinas and Luxembourgish Braille.

Character information
Preview	⡐ (braille pattern dots-57)		⢐ (braille pattern dots-58)		⣐ (braille pattern dots-578)	
Unicode name	BRAILLE PATTERN DOTS-57		BRAILLE PATTERN DOTS-58		BRAILLE PATTERN DOTS-578	
Encodings	decimal	hex	dec	hex	dec	hex
Unicode	10320	U+2850	10384	U+2890	10448	U+28D0
UTF-8	226 161 144	E2 A1 90	226 162 144	E2 A2 90	226 163 144	E2 A3 90
Numeric character reference	&#10320;	&#x2850;	&#10384;	&#x2890;	&#10448;	&#x28D0;

	dots 57	dots 58	dots 578
Gardner Salinas Braille	^ (caret)		÷ (division sign)

== Related 8-dot kantenji patterns ==
In the Japanese kantenji braille, the standard 8-dot Braille patterns 6, 16, 46, and 146 are the patterns related to Braille pattern dots-5, since the two additional dots of kantenji patterns 05, 57, and 057 are placed above the base 6-dot cell, instead of below, as in standard 8-dot braille.

Character information
Preview	⠠ (braille pattern dots-6)		⠡ (braille pattern dots-16)		⠨ (braille pattern dots-46)		⠩ (braille pattern dots-146)	
Unicode name	BRAILLE PATTERN DOTS-6		BRAILLE PATTERN DOTS-16		BRAILLE PATTERN DOTS-46		BRAILLE PATTERN DOTS-146	
Encodings	decimal	hex	dec	hex	dec	hex	dec	hex
Unicode	10272	U+2820	10273	U+2821	10280	U+2828	10281	U+2829
UTF-8	226 160 160	E2 A0 A0	226 160 161	E2 A0 A1	226 160 168	E2 A0 A8	226 160 169	E2 A0 A9
Numeric character reference	&#10272;	&#x2820;	&#10273;	&#x2821;	&#10280;	&#x2828;	&#10281;	&#x2829;

=== Kantenji using braille patterns 6, 16, 46, or 146 ===
This listing includes kantenji using Braille pattern dots-5 for all 6349 kanji found in JIS C 6226-1978.

- - N/A - used only as a selector

==== Selector ====
- - を/貝 + selector 5 = 具
  - - な/亻 + を/貝 + selector 5 = 倶
  - - る/忄 + を/貝 + selector 5 = 惧
  - - む/車 + を/貝 + selector 5 = 颶
- - も/門 + selector 5 = 句
  - - な/亻 + も/門 + selector 5 = 佝
  - - ぬ/力 + も/門 + selector 5 = 劬
  - - る/忄 + も/門 + selector 5 = 怐
  - - 心 + も/門 + selector 5 = 枸
  - - 火 + も/門 + selector 5 = 煦
  - - く/艹 + も/門 + selector 5 = 苟
  - - か/金 + も/門 + selector 5 = 鉤
- - ふ/女 + selector 5 = 妹
- - ゆ/彳 + selector 5 = 弔
- - 心 + selector 5 = 必
  - - え/訁 + 心 + selector 5 = 謐
- - 囗 + selector 5 = 戔
- - て/扌 + selector 5 = 拘
- - た/⽥ + selector 5 = 曲
  - - と/戸 + た/⽥ + selector 5 = 髷
- - き/木 + selector 5 = 末
  - - て/扌 + き/木 + selector 5 = 抹
  - - に/氵 + き/木 + selector 5 = 沫
  - - の/禾 + き/木 + selector 5 = 秣
  - - 心 + き/木 + selector 5 = 茉
  - - と/戸 + き/木 + selector 5 = 靺
- - へ/⺩ + selector 5 = 片
- - や/疒 + selector 5 = 疾
  - - ふ/女 + や/疒 + selector 5 = 嫉
- - の/禾 + selector 5 = 秘
  - - の/禾 + の/禾 + selector 5 = 祕
- - と/戸 + selector 5 = 考
  - - き/木 + と/戸 + selector 5 = 栲
- - む/車 + selector 5 = 虱
- - か/金 + selector 5 = 鈎
- - そ/馬 + selector 5 = 駒
- - け/犬 + selector 5 = 鼡
  - - け/犬 + け/犬 + selector 5 = 鼠
    - - う/宀/#3 + け/犬 + selector 5 = 竄
    - - と/戸 + け/犬 + selector 5 = 鬣
- - selector 5 + そ/馬 = 且
  - - な/亻 + selector 5 + そ/馬 = 俎
  - - れ/口 + selector 5 + そ/馬 = 咀
  - - ふ/女 + selector 5 + そ/馬 = 姐
  - - や/疒 + selector 5 + そ/馬 = 岨
  - - ゆ/彳 + selector 5 + そ/馬 = 徂
  - - き/木 + selector 5 + そ/馬 = 柤
  - - に/氵 + selector 5 + そ/馬 = 沮
  - - め/目 + selector 5 + そ/馬 = 爼
  - - ま/石 + selector 5 + そ/馬 = 砠
  - - く/艹 + selector 5 + そ/馬 = 苴
  - - む/車 + selector 5 + そ/馬 = 蛆
  - - え/訁 + selector 5 + そ/馬 = 詛
- - selector 5 + の/禾 = 之
- - selector 5 + い/糹/#2 = 井
  - - た/⽥ + selector 5 + い/糹/#2 = 畊
  - - ほ/方 + selector 5 + い/糹/#2 = 舛
    - - き/木 + selector 5 + い/糹/#2 = 桝
- - selector 5 + 日 = 亘
  - - き/木 + selector 5 + 日 = 桓
- - selector 5 + ほ/方 = 亡
  - - ⺼ + selector 5 + ほ/方 = 肓
  - - 心 + selector 5 + ほ/方 = 芒
    - - か/金 + selector 5 + ほ/方 = 鋩
  - - く/艹 + selector 5 + ほ/方 = 茫
  - - む/車 + selector 5 + ほ/方 = 虻
  - - る/忄 + selector 5 + ほ/方 = 惘
  - - に/氵 + selector 5 + ほ/方 = 瀛
- - selector 5 + 宿 = 亢
  - - れ/口 + selector 5 + 宿 = 吭
- - selector 5 + ゐ/幺 = 亥
  - - つ/土 + selector 5 + ゐ/幺 = 垓
  - - こ/子 + selector 5 + ゐ/幺 = 孩
  - - そ/馬 + selector 5 + ゐ/幺 = 駭
- - selector 5 + る/忄 = 侖
- - selector 5 + ゆ/彳 = 兪
  - - 心 + selector 5 + ゆ/彳 = 楡
  - - へ/⺩ + selector 5 + ゆ/彳 = 瑜
  - - む/車 + selector 5 + ゆ/彳 = 蝓
- - selector 5 + 囗 = 冂
- - selector 5 + え/訁 = 叟
  - - ふ/女 + selector 5 + え/訁 = 嫂
- - selector 5 + こ/子 = 呉
  - - く/艹 + selector 5 + こ/子 = 茣
  - - む/車 + selector 5 + こ/子 = 蜈
- - selector 5 + け/犬 = 咢
- - selector 5 + て/扌 = 夬
- - selector 5 + な/亻 = 夾
  - - て/扌 + selector 5 + な/亻 = 挾
  - - ち/竹 + selector 5 + な/亻 = 筴
- - selector 5 + ⺼ = 奐
- - selector 5 + ひ/辶 = 巴
  - - ち/竹 + selector 5 + ひ/辶 = 笆
- - selector 5 + さ/阝 = 巷
- - selector 5 + り/分 = 帚
  - - く/艹 + selector 5 + り/分 = 菷
- - selector 5 + う/宀/#3 = 彭
- - selector 5 + ま/石 = 曼
- - selector 5 + か/金 = 朱
  - - な/亻 + selector 5 + か/金 = 侏
  - - に/氵 + selector 5 + か/金 = 洙
  - - 心 + selector 5 + か/金 = 茱
  - - む/車 + selector 5 + か/金 = 蛛
  - - え/訁 + selector 5 + か/金 = 誅
  - - か/金 + selector 5 + か/金 = 銖
- - selector 5 + 仁/亻 = 爰
- - selector 5 + む/車 = 牟
  - - き/木 + selector 5 + む/車 = 桙
  - - め/目 + selector 5 + む/車 = 眸
- - selector 5 + し/巿 = 申
  - - つ/土 + selector 5 + し/巿 = 坤
  - - て/扌 + selector 5 + し/巿 = 抻
- - selector 5 + み/耳 = 禹
- - selector 5 + く/艹 = 禺
  - - く/艹 + selector 5 + く/艹 = 藕
- - selector 5 + 龸 = 舜
  - - 心 + selector 5 + 龸 = 蕣
- - selector 5 + と/戸 = 豆
  - - よ/广 + selector 5 + と/戸 = 厨
  - - 心 + selector 5 + と/戸 = 荳
  - - う/宀/#3 + selector 5 + と/戸 = 豌
  - - ひ/辶 + selector 5 + と/戸 = 逗
- - selector 5 + や/疒 = 豈
  - - 心 + selector 5 + や/疒 = 榿
  - - ま/石 + selector 5 + や/疒 = 磑
- - selector 5 + ふ/女 = 賁
- - selector 5 + に/氵 = 賈
- - selector 5 + も/門 = 鬥
- - selector 5 + め/目 = 黽
- - selector 5 + selector 4 + ね/示 = 劔
