= Braille pattern dots-56 =

Braille pattern

6-dot braille cells
| ⠀ | ⠁ | ⠃ | ⠉ | ⠙ | ⠑ | ⠋ | ⠛ | ⠓ | ⠊ | ⠚ | ⠈ | ⠘ |
| ⠄ | ⠅ | ⠇ | ⠍ | ⠝ | ⠕ | ⠏ | ⠟ | ⠗ | ⠎ | ⠞ | ⠌ | ⠜ |
| ⠤ | ⠥ | ⠧ | ⠭ | ⠽ | ⠵ | ⠯ | ⠿ | ⠷ | ⠮ | ⠾ | ⠬ | ⠼ |
| ⠠ | ⠡ | ⠣ | ⠩ | ⠹ | ⠱ | ⠫ | ⠻ | ⠳ | ⠪ | ⠺ | ⠨ | ⠸ |
| shift down | ⠂ | ⠆ | ⠒ | ⠲ | ⠢ | ⠖ | ⠶ | ⠦ | ⠔ | ⠴ | ⠐ | ⠰ |

The Braille pattern dots-56 ( ⠰ ) is a 6-dot braille cell with the middle and bottom right dots raised, or an 8-dot braille cell with the upper-middle and lower-middle right dots raised. It is represented by the Unicode code point U+2830, and in Braille ASCII with a semicolon: ;.

Character information
| Preview | ⠰ (braille pattern dots-56) | |
|---|---|---|
| Unicode name | BRAILLE PATTERN DOTS-56 | |
| Encodings | decimal | hex |
| Unicode | 10288 | U+2830 |
| UTF-8 | 226 160 176 | E2 A0 B0 |
| Numeric character reference | &#10288; | &#x2830; |
| Braille ASCII | 59 | 3B |

== Unified Braille ==
In unified international braille, the braille pattern dots-56 is used as a punctuation or formatting sign, or otherwise as needed.

=== Table of unified braille values ===
| French Braille | uncontracted value sign, or |
| English Braille | final letter abbreviation |
| German Braille | -ach |
| Bharati Braille | / ன |
| IPA Braille | national orthography (non-IPA) format sign |
| Slovak Braille | lower case mark |
| Arabic Braille | ; (semicolon) |
| Persian Braille | mathematical symbol sign |
| Thai Braille | not an independent sign |

== Other braille ==
| Japanese Braille | 、 (comma) |
| Korean Braille | ch- / ㅊ |
| Mainland Chinese Braille | ; (semicolon) |
| Taiwanese Braille | ; (semicolon) |
| Two-Cell Chinese Braille | foreign script mark |
| Nemeth Braille | subscript, letter mark |

== Plus dots 7 and 8 ==
Related to Braille pattern dots-56 are Braille patterns 567, 568, and 5678, which are used in 8-dot braille systems, such as Gardner-Salinas and Luxembourgish Braille.

Character information
| Preview | ⡰ (braille pattern dots-567) | | ⢰ (braille pattern dots-568) | | ⣰ (braille pattern dots-5678) | |
|---|---|---|---|---|---|---|
| Unicode name | BRAILLE PATTERN DOTS-567 | | BRAILLE PATTERN DOTS-568 | | BRAILLE PATTERN DOTS-5678 | |
| Encodings | decimal | hex | dec | hex | dec | hex |
| Unicode | 10352 | U+2870 | 10416 | U+28B0 | 10480 | U+28F0 |
| UTF-8 | 226 161 176 | E2 A1 B0 | 226 162 176 | E2 A2 B0 | 226 163 176 | E2 A3 B0 |
| Numeric character reference | &#10352; | &#x2870; | &#10416; | &#x28B0; | &#10480; | &#x28F0; |

| | dots 567 | dots 568 | dots 5678 |
|---|---|---|---|
| Gardner Salinas Braille | | | close complex radicand |

== Related 8-dot kantenji patterns ==
In the Japanese kantenji braille, the standard 8-dot Braille patterns 68, 168, 468, and 1468 are the patterns related to Braille pattern dots-56, since the two additional dots of kantenji patterns 056, 567, and 0567 are placed above the base 6-dot cell, instead of below, as in standard 8-dot braille.

Character information
| Preview | ⢠ (braille pattern dots-68) | | ⢡ (braille pattern dots-168) | | ⢨ (braille pattern dots-468) | | ⢩ (braille pattern dots-1468) | |
|---|---|---|---|---|---|---|---|---|
| Unicode name | BRAILLE PATTERN DOTS-68 | | BRAILLE PATTERN DOTS-168 | | BRAILLE PATTERN DOTS-468 | | BRAILLE PATTERN DOTS-1468 | |
| Encodings | decimal | hex | dec | hex | dec | hex | dec | hex |
| Unicode | 10400 | U+28A0 | 10401 | U+28A1 | 10408 | U+28A8 | 10409 | U+28A9 |
| UTF-8 | 226 162 160 | E2 A2 A0 | 226 162 161 | E2 A2 A1 | 226 162 168 | E2 A2 A8 | 226 162 169 | E2 A2 A9 |
| Numeric character reference | &#10400; | &#x28A0; | &#10401; | &#x28A1; | &#10408; | &#x28A8; | &#10409; | &#x28A9; |

=== Kantenji using braille patterns 68, 168, 468, or 1468 ===
This listing includes kantenji using Braille pattern dots-56 for all 6349 kanji found in JIS C 6226-1978.

The kantenji is used in indicating most of the common (non-banking) number kanji, as well as the classical heavenly stem ordinals.

- - 数

==== Variants and thematic compounds ====
- - selector 4 + 数 = 勿
- - 比 + 数 = 右

==== Compounds of 勿 ====
- - れ/口 + 数 = 吻
- - 数 + 心 = 忽
- - 日 + 数 = 易
  - - 仁/亻 + 数 = 傷
  - - つ/土 + 数 = 場
    - - つ/土 + つ/土 + 数 = 塲
  - - て/扌 + 数 = 揚
  - - し/巿 + 数 = 暢
  - - に/氵 + 数 = 湯
    - - ⺼ + に/氵 + 数 = 盪
    - - く/艹 + に/氵 + 数 = 蕩
  - - や/疒 + 数 = 瘍
  - - ⺼ + 数 = 腸
    - - ⺼ + ⺼ + 数 = 膓
  - - 囗 + 数 = 觴
  - - を/貝 + 数 = 賜
  - - か/金 + 数 = 錫
  - - さ/阝 + 数 = 陽
  - - ぬ/力 + 日 + 数 = 剔
  - - む/車 + 日 + 数 = 蜴
  - - ね/示 + 日 + 数 = 裼
  - - せ/食 + 日 + 数 = 鯣
  - - る/忄 + 宿 + 数 = 慯
  - - 日 + 宿 + 数 = 暘
  - - 心 + 宿 + 数 = 楊
  - - ほ/方 + 宿 + 数 = 殤
  - - 火 + 宿 + 数 = 煬
  - - む/車 + 宿 + 数 = 蝪
- - そ/馬 + 数 = 物
- - の/禾 + 数 = 黎
- - ぬ/力 + selector 4 + 数 = 刎
- - 日 + selector 4 + 数 = 昜
- - ち/竹 + selector 4 + 数 = 笏

==== Compounds of 右 ====
- - く/艹 + 数 = 若
  - - も/門 + 数 = 匿
    - - る/忄 + も/門 + 数 = 慝
  - - え/訁 + 数 = 諾
  - - る/忄 + く/艹 + 数 = 惹
- - ね/示 + 数 = 祐
- - な/亻 + 比 + 数 = 佑
- - せ/食 + 比 + 数 = 醢

==== Compounds of numbers ====
- - 数 + #1 = 一
  - - ふ/女 + 数 + selector 1 = 丕
- - 数 + #2 = 二
- - 数 + #3 = 三
- - 数 + #4 = 四
  - - に/氵 + 数 + る/忄 = 泗
  - - そ/馬 + 数 + る/忄 = 駟
- - 数 + #5 = 五
  - - な/亻 + 数 + ら/月 = 伍
- - 数 + #6 = 六
  - - う/宀/#3 + 数 + え/訁 = 宍
- - 数 + #7 = 七
- - 数 + #8 = 八
  - - れ/口 + 数 + り/分 = 叭
  - - か/金 + 数 + り/分 = 釟
- - 数 + #9 = 九
  - - と/戸 + 数 = 尻
  - - 日 + 数 + お/頁 = 旭
  - - ひ/辶 + 数 + お/頁 = 馗
- - 数 + め/目 = 百
  - - な/亻 + 数 + め/目 = 佰
  - - ゆ/彳 + 数 + め/目 = 弼
  - - 心 + 数 + め/目 = 栢
  - - か/金 + 数 + め/目 = 瓸
  - - ま/石 + 数 + め/目 = 竡
  - - の/禾 + 数 + め/目 = 粨
  - - そ/馬 + 数 + め/目 = 貊
  - - さ/阝 + 数 + め/目 = 陌
- - 数 + せ/食 = 千
  - - な/亻 + 数 + せ/食 = 仟
  - - ぬ/力 + 数 + せ/食 = 刋
  - - ま/石 + 数 + せ/食 = 竏
  - - さ/阝 + 数 + せ/食 = 阡
- - 数 + ま/石 = 万
  - - 数 + 数 + ま/石 = 萬
    - - の/禾 + 数 + ま/石 = 糲
    - - や/疒 + 数 + ま/石 = 癘
  - - む/車 + 数 + ま/石 = 蛎
  - - 心 + 数 + ま/石 = 栃
  - - ま/石 + 数 + ま/石 = 砺
  - - き/木 + 数 + る/忄 = 楞
  - - 心 + 龸 + 数 = 杤
- - 数 + 宿 = 兆
  - - な/亻 + 数 + 宿 = 佻
  - - て/扌 + 数 + 宿 = 挑
  - - 日 + 数 + 宿 = 晁
  - - う/宀/#3 + 数 + 宿 = 窕
  - - か/金 + 数 + 宿 = 銚
- - 数 + な/亻 = 億
- - 数 + と/戸 = 廿
- - 数 + よ/广 = 丗
  - - 数 + 数 + よ/广 = 卅

==== Compounds of heavenly stems ====
- - 数 + こ/子 = 甲
  - - も/門 + 数 + こ/子 = 匣
  - - れ/口 + 数 + こ/子 = 呷
  - - け/犬 + 数 + こ/子 = 狎
  - - ⺼ + 数 + こ/子 = 胛
- - 数 + を/貝 = 乙
  - - や/疒 + 数 + を/貝 = 乢
  - - て/扌 + 数 + を/貝 = 扎
- - 数 + へ/⺩ = 丙
  - - 火 + 数 + へ/⺩ = 炳
  - - さ/阝 + 数 + へ/⺩ = 陋
  - - と/戸 + 数 + へ/⺩ = 鞆
- - 数 + て/扌 = 丁
  - - れ/口 + 数 + て/扌 = 叮
  - - に/氵 + 数 + て/扌 = 汀
  - - た/⽥ + 数 + て/扌 = 甼
  - - や/疒 + 数 + て/扌 = 疔
  - - ま/石 + 数 + て/扌 = 竚
  - - い/糹/#2 + 数 + て/扌 = 紵
  - - 心 + 数 + て/扌 = 苧
  - - せ/食 + 数 + て/扌 = 酊
- - 数 + ひ/辶 = 戊
- - 数 + き/木 = 己
  - - 心 + 数 + き/木 = 杞
- - 数 + の/禾 = 庚
- - 数 + に/氵 = 壬
  - - ふ/女 + 数 + に/氵 = 婬
  - - ね/示 + 数 + に/氵 = 衽
- - 数 + す/発 = 癸
  - - て/扌 + 数 + す/発 = 揆

==== Other compounds ====
- - 数 + ち/竹 = 父
- - 数 + し/巿 = 寸
- - き/木 + 数 = 束
  - - ぬ/力 + 数 = 勅
    - - ぬ/力 + ぬ/力 + 数 = 敕
  - - ん/止 + 数 = 整
  - - 氷/氵 + 数 = 瀬
  - - よ/广 + 数 = 疎
  - - ま/石 + 数 = 辣
  - - ひ/辶 + 数 = 速
  - - お/頁 + 数 = 頼
  - - る/忄 + き/木 + 数 = 悚
  - - selector 1 + き/木 + 数 = 朿
    - - ち/竹 + 数 = 策
    - - き/木 + き/木 + 数 = 棗
    - - 心 + き/木 + 数 = 棘
  - - ま/石 + き/木 + 数 = 竦
  - - み/耳 + き/木 + 数 = 踈
  - - 心 + 数 + 数 = 蕀
  - - ふ/女 + お/頁 + 数 = 嬾
  - - る/忄 + お/頁 + 数 = 懶
  - - け/犬 + お/頁 + 数 = 獺
  - - や/疒 + お/頁 + 数 = 癩
  - - ち/竹 + お/頁 + 数 = 籟
  - - 心 + お/頁 + 数 = 藾
- - ゑ/訁 + 数 = 讐
- - そ/馬 + 数 + り/分 = 尓
- - 数 + う/宀/#3 + 龸 = 卍
- - く/艹 + 宿 + 数 = 薮
- - ゑ/訁 + 宿 + 数 = 讎
- - 数 + 数 + 数 = 數
- - う/宀/#3 + 宿 + 数 = 窶
- - ち/竹 + 宿 + 数 = 籔
- - く/艹 + 龸 + 数 = 藪
- - 数 + か/金 + ら/月 = 髏
