= Night writing =

System of code

Night Writing
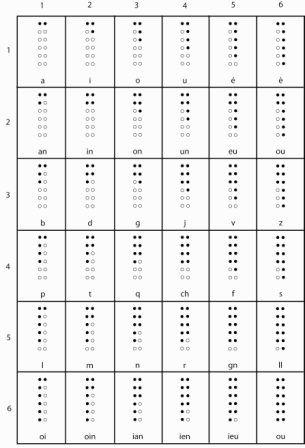
- Script type: Alphabet
- Period: 1815
- Languages: French

Related scripts
- Child systems: Braille, New York Point

Unicode
- Unicode range: (not supported)

Night writing is the name given to a form of tactile writing invented by Charles Barbier de la Serre (1767–1841). It is one of a dozen forms of alternative writing presented in a book published in 1815: Essai sur divers procédés d'expéditive française, contenant douze écritures différentes, avec une planche pour chaque procédé (Essay on various processes of French expedition, containing twelve different writings, with a plate for each process). The term (in French: écriture nocturne) does not appear in the book, but was later applied to the method shown on Plate VII of that book. This method of writing with raised dots that could be read by touch was adopted at the Institution Royale des Jeunes Aveugles (Royal Institution for Blind Youth) in Paris in 1821.

A student at the school, Louis Braille, used the tools and Barbier's idea of communicating with raised dots in a form of code, and developed a more compact and flexible system for communications, Braille.

== Function ==
The principle of night writing is to transcribe using 36 distinct phonetic sounds, each represented by a raised pattern of dots in a 2 × 6 grid.

The 36 sounds are represented in a 6 × 6 table; the 2 × 6 grid of dots designates the coordinates of the desired sound. For example, the sound placed in the first line and the third column of the table is represented by (1, 3). This, in turn, is written with 1 dot in the first column, and 3 dots in the second.

Table of correspondence between phoneme and respective coordinates
	1	2	3	4	5	6
1	a	i	o	u	é	è
2	an	in	on	un	eu	ou
3	b	d	g	j	v	z
4	p	t	q	ch	f	s
5	l	m	n	r	gn	ll
6	oi	oin	ian	ien	ion	ieu

The phoneme "t" is represented thus:

Charles Barbier also invented the tools to facilitate this form of writing with raised dots: a shelf ruler that had groups of 6 horizontal grooves. To transcribe their message, the writer uses a punch to pierce the paper, guided by the grooves of the ruler. A movable cursor helps guide the punch. The relief writing appears on the back of the paper; the writing is therefore reversed, hence one must write from right to left. By running their fingers across the front, the recipient of the message counts the number of dots in each row and deduces the nature of the corresponding sound.

This was an extraordinary advancement in its time. Previously, the only writing accessible to the blind was one developed by Valentin Haüy, the founder of the Royal Institution for Blind Youth. His system impressed the shapes of typographic characters onto wet paper. However, as the embossed letters had to each be distinct, books using the system were cumbersome and of limited length. Furthermore, students had no means to reproduce the method so as to write themselves.

Barbier's night writing also faced several limitations and imperfections:

- no combinations of dots existed to represent capital letters, musical notes, mathematical symbols, etc.
- the height of the grid (2 × 6 points) made it impossible to read in a single go with one finger
- potential information is wasted: a grid of 12 points would theoretically allow up to 2^{12} (or 4096) symbols to be represented, when Barbier presented only 36 symbols.

== Influence on Braille ==
In 1815, Barbier published a pamphlet titled Essai sur divers procédés d'expéditive française, contenant douze écritures différentes, avec une planche pour chaque procédé (Essay on various processes of French expedition, containing twelve different writings, with a plate for each process). The aim was to present how relief writing, recognisable by touch, could aid the blind.

In 1823, Barbier received a bronze medal at Versailles' industrial exposition for having invented this new form of writing which could be read without seeing. Under the administration of Count Alexis de Noailles, his method was adopted by the Royal Institution for Blind Youth.

In 1829, Louis Braille published Procédé pour écrire les paroles, la musique et le plain-chant au moyen de points, à l’usage des aveugles et disposés pour eux (Process for writing words, music and plainsong by way of dots, for the use of, and arranged for, the blind). This was based on Barbier's invention but greatly improved its legibility, and the publication marked the official birth of the Braille alphabet. Louis Braille revised the publication in 1837, and this second edition contained the system now known by the name Braille.

In 1832, Barbier published a new pamphlet, Émancipation intellectuelle d’expéditive française, which stresses that his writing system, though designed for the blind, could also be of use in the army and in hospitals.

== Encoding ==
The characters of Night Writing can be partially represented by the existing Braille allocation in Unicode. Additional patterns needed for representing the remaining Night Writing characters can be found in the Under-ConScript Unicode Registry, an unofficial but widely supported Private Use agreement for Unicode Private Use Areas.

Braille Patterns^{[1]} Official Unicode Consortium code chart (PDF)
	0	1	2	3	4	5	6	7	8	9	A	B	C	D	E	F
U+280x										⠉		⠋				⠏
U+281x										⠙		⠛				⠟
U+282x																
U+283x										⠹		⠻				⠿
U+284x																⡏
U+285x																⡟
U+286x																
U+287x																⡿
U+288x																
U+289x																
U+28Ax																
U+28Bx										⢹		⢻				⢿
U+28Cx																
U+28Dx																
U+28Ex																
U+28Fx																⣿
Notes 1.As of Unicode version 17.0

Braille Supplement (Images)
	0	1	2	3	4	5	6	7	8	9	A	B	C	D	E	F
U+F16Ex																
U+F16Fx																
Notes Added to UCSUR 2025-08-11.

Braille Supplement (Plain Text)
	0	1	2	3	4	5	6	7	8	9	A	B	C	D	E	F
U+F16Ex	󱛠	󱛡	󱛢	󱛣	󱛤	󱛥	󱛦	󱛧	󱛨	󱛩	󱛪	󱛫	󱛬	󱛭	󱛮	󱛯
U+F16Fx	󱛰	󱛱	󱛲	󱛳												
Notes Added to UCSUR 2025-08-11.

== See also ==
- Nyctography
- New York Point
