= Braille pattern dots-1 =

Braille pattern

6-dot braille cells
| ⠀ | ⠁ | ⠃ | ⠉ | ⠙ | ⠑ | ⠋ | ⠛ | ⠓ | ⠊ | ⠚ | ⠈ | ⠘ |
| ⠄ | ⠅ | ⠇ | ⠍ | ⠝ | ⠕ | ⠏ | ⠟ | ⠗ | ⠎ | ⠞ | ⠌ | ⠜ |
| ⠤ | ⠥ | ⠧ | ⠭ | ⠽ | ⠵ | ⠯ | ⠿ | ⠷ | ⠮ | ⠾ | ⠬ | ⠼ |
| ⠠ | ⠡ | ⠣ | ⠩ | ⠹ | ⠱ | ⠫ | ⠻ | ⠳ | ⠪ | ⠺ | ⠨ | ⠸ |
| shift down | ⠂ | ⠆ | ⠒ | ⠲ | ⠢ | ⠖ | ⠶ | ⠦ | ⠔ | ⠴ | ⠐ | ⠰ |

The Braille pattern dots-1 ( ⠁ ) is a 6-dot or 8-dot braille cell with the top left dot raised. It is represented by the Unicode code point U+2801, and in Braille ASCII with "A".

Character information
| Preview | ⠁ (braille pattern dots-1) | |
|---|---|---|
| Unicode name | BRAILLE PATTERN DOTS-1 | |
| Encodings | decimal | hex |
| Unicode | 10241 | U+2801 |
| UTF-8 | 226 160 129 | E2 A0 81 |
| Numeric character reference | &#10241; | &#x2801; |
| Braille ASCII | 65 | 41 |

== Unified Braille ==
In unified international braille, the braille pattern dots-1 is used to represent open, unrounded vowel sound, like /æ/ or /ɑ/, such as the Latin letter A, Greek alpha, Cyrillic А, Hebrew/Arabic aleph, etc. It is also used to signify the number 1.

=== Table of unified braille values ===
| Italian Braille | A |
| French Braille | A |
| English Braille | A |
| German Braille | A |
| Bharati Braille | अ / ਅ / અ / অ / ଅ / అ / ಅ / അ / அ / අ |
| Icelandic Braille | A |
| IPA Braille | /a/ |
| Russian Braille | А |
| Slovak Braille | A |
| Arabic Braille | ا |
| Persian Braille | ا |
| Irish Braille | A |
| Thai Braille | ◌ะ |
| Luxembourgish Braille | a (minuscule) |

== Other braille ==
| Japanese Braille | a / あ / ア |
| Korean Braille | g- / ㄱ |
| Mainland Chinese Braille | tone 1 |
| Taiwanese Braille | tone 0 |
| Two-Cell Chinese Braille | g- -èn |
| Nemeth Braille | not an independent symbol |
| Gardner Salinas Braille | "a" |
| Algerian Braille | ا |

== Plus dots 7 and 8 ==
Related to Braille pattern dots-1 are Braille patterns 17, 18, and 178, which are used in 8-dot braille systems, such as Gardner-Salinas and Luxembourgish Braille.

Character information
| Preview | ⡁ (braille pattern dots-17) | | ⢁ (braille pattern dots-18) | | ⣁ (braille pattern dots-178) | |
|---|---|---|---|---|---|---|
| Unicode name | BRAILLE PATTERN DOTS-17 | | BRAILLE PATTERN DOTS-18 | | BRAILLE PATTERN DOTS-178 | |
| Encodings | decimal | hex | dec | hex | dec | hex |
| Unicode | 10305 | U+2841 | 10369 | U+2881 | 10433 | U+28C1 |
| UTF-8 | 226 161 129 | E2 A1 81 | 226 162 129 | E2 A2 81 | 226 163 129 | E2 A3 81 |
| Numeric character reference | &#10305; | &#x2841; | &#10369; | &#x2881; | &#10433; | &#x28C1; |

| | dots 17 | dots 18 | dots 178 |
|---|---|---|---|
| Gardner Salinas Braille | A (capital) | α (alpha) | |
| Luxembourgish Braille | A (capital) | | |

== Related 8-dot kantenji patterns ==
In the Japanese kantenji braille, the standard 8-dot Braille patterns 2, 12, 24, and 124 are the 8-dot braille patterns related to Braille pattern dots-1, since the two additional dots of kantenji patterns 01, 17, and 017 are placed above the base 6-dot cell, instead of below, as in standard 8-dot braille.

Character information
| Preview | ⠂ (braille pattern dots-2) | | ⠃ (braille pattern dots-12) | | ⠊ (braille pattern dots-24) | | ⠋ (braille pattern dots-124) | |
|---|---|---|---|---|---|---|---|---|
| Unicode name | BRAILLE PATTERN DOTS-2 | | BRAILLE PATTERN DOTS-12 | | BRAILLE PATTERN DOTS-24 | | BRAILLE PATTERN DOTS-124 | |
| Encodings | decimal | hex | dec | hex | dec | hex | dec | hex |
| Unicode | 10242 | U+2802 | 10243 | U+2803 | 10250 | U+280A | 10251 | U+280B |
| UTF-8 | 226 160 130 | E2 A0 82 | 226 160 131 | E2 A0 83 | 226 160 138 | E2 A0 8A | 226 160 139 | E2 A0 8B |
| Numeric character reference | &#10242; | &#x2802; | &#10243; | &#x2803; | &#10250; | &#x280A; | &#10251; | &#x280B; |

=== Kantenji using braille patterns 2, 12, 24, or 124 ===
This listing includes kantenji using Braille pattern dots-1 for all 6349 kanji found in JIS C 6226-1978.

- - N/A - used only as a selector

==== Selector ====
- - り/分 + selector 1 = 今
  - - や/疒 + り/分 + selector 1 = 岑
  - - よ/广 + り/分 + selector 1 = 矜
  - - ね/示 + り/分 + selector 1 = 衾
  - - し/巿 + り/分 + selector 1 = 黔
- - 宿 + selector 1 = 写
- - 宿 + 宿 + selector 1 = 冩
  - - う/宀/#3 + 宿 + selector 1 = 寫
  - - に/氵 + 宿 + selector 1 = 瀉
- - selector 1 + ぬ/力 = 刃
  - - て/扌 + selector 1 + ぬ/力 = 扨
  - - な/亻 + selector 1 + ぬ/力 = 仞
  - - の/禾 + selector 1 + ぬ/力 = 籾
  - - と/戸 + selector 1 + ぬ/力 = 靭
- - selector 1 + selector 1 + ぬ/力 = 刄
  - - 仁/亻 + selector 1 + ぬ/力 = 仭
  - - か/金 + selector 1 + ぬ/力 = 釼
- - つ/土 + selector 1 = 士
  - - つ/土 + selector 1 + め/目 = 填
  - - つ/土 + selector 1 + 亞 = 壼
- - す/発 + selector 1 = 冬
  - - す/発 + selector 1 + selector 1 = 夊
  - - 心 + す/発 + selector 1 = 柊
  - - や/疒 + す/発 + selector 1 = 疼
  - - く/艹 + す/発 + selector 1 = 苳
  - - む/車 + す/発 + selector 1 = 螽
  - - せ/食 + す/発 + selector 1 = 鮗
  - - と/戸 + す/発 + selector 1 = 鼕
- - よ/广 + selector 1 = 原
  - - よ/广 + selector 1 + selector 1 = 厂
  - - る/忄 + よ/广 + selector 1 = 愿
- - お/頁 + selector 1 = 君
  - - 心 + お/頁 + selector 1 = 桾
  - - う/宀/#3 + お/頁 + selector 1 = 窘
  - - そ/馬 + お/頁 + selector 1 = 羣
  - - ね/示 + お/頁 + selector 1 = 裙
- - 氷/氵 + selector 1 = 冷
- - る/忄 + selector 1 = 壱
  - - れ/口 + る/忄 + selector 1 = 噎
  - - る/忄 + る/忄 + selector 1 = 壹
  - - ほ/方 + る/忄 + selector 1 = 殪
  - - せ/食 + る/忄 + selector 1 = 饐
- - ほ/方 + selector 1 = 夕
  - - さ/阝 + ほ/方 + selector 1 = 夘
  - - に/氵 + ほ/方 + selector 1 = 汐
  - - selector 1 + ほ/方 + ほ/方 = 夛
- - と/戸 + selector 1 = 居
  - - な/亻 + と/戸 + selector 1 = 倨
  - - て/扌 + と/戸 + selector 1 = 据
  - - ね/示 + と/戸 + selector 1 = 裾
  - - み/耳 + と/戸 + selector 1 = 踞
  - - か/金 + と/戸 + selector 1 = 鋸
- - や/疒 + selector 1 = 山
  - - や/疒 + selector 1 + ん/止 = 岻
  - - 仁/亻 + や/疒 + selector 1 = 仙
  - - つ/土 + や/疒 + selector 1 = 圸
  - - き/木 + や/疒 + selector 1 = 杣
  - - に/氵 + や/疒 + selector 1 = 汕
  - - や/疒 + や/疒 + selector 1 = 疝
  - - も/門 + や/疒 + selector 1 = 閊
- - か/金 + selector 1 = 川
  - - か/金 + か/金 + selector 1 = 釧
- - こ/子 + selector 1 = 工
  - - て/扌 + こ/子 + selector 1 = 扛
  - - き/木 + こ/子 + selector 1 = 杢
  - - に/氵 + こ/子 + selector 1 = 汞
  - - ま/石 + こ/子 + selector 1 = 矼
  - - ん/止 + こ/子 + selector 1 = 缸
  - - ⺼ + こ/子 + selector 1 = 肛
  - - え/訁 + こ/子 + selector 1 = 訌
- - ゐ/幺 + selector 1 = 幼
  - - て/扌 + ゐ/幺 + selector 1 = 拗
  - - う/宀/#3 + ゐ/幺 + selector 1 = 窈
  - - し/巿 + ゐ/幺 + selector 1 = 黝
- - は/辶 + selector 1 = 延
  - - は/辶 + selector 1 + selector 1 = 廴
  - - に/氵 + は/辶 + selector 1 = 涎
  - - ち/竹 + は/辶 + selector 1 = 筵
  - - く/艹 + は/辶 + selector 1 = 莚
  - - む/車 + は/辶 + selector 1 = 蜒
  - - は/辶 + む/車 + selector 1 = 蜑
- - ゆ/彳 + selector 1 = 弓
  - - selector 1 + ゆ/彳 + selector 1 = 弖
  - - に/氵 + ゆ/彳 + selector 1 = 泓
  - - う/宀/#3 + ゆ/彳 + selector 1 = 穹
  - - み/耳 + ゆ/彳 + selector 1 = 躬
- - 龸 + selector 1 = 愛
  - - 日 + 龸 + selector 1 = 曖
  - - め/目 + 龸 + selector 1 = 瞹
  - - ち/竹 + 龸 + selector 1 = 靉
- - 囗 + selector 1 = 我
  - - 囗 + selector 1 + せ/食 = 鵝
  - - な/亻 + 囗 + selector 1 = 俄
  - - れ/口 + 囗 + selector 1 = 哦
  - - ふ/女 + 囗 + selector 1 = 娥
  - - や/疒 + 囗 + selector 1 = 峨
  - - 心 + 囗 + selector 1 = 莪
  - - selector 1 + 囗 = 伐
- - 心 + selector 1 = 桜
  - - 心 + selector 1 + よ/广 = 楙
- - ん/止 + selector 1 = 欠
  - - よ/广 + ん/止 + selector 1 = 厥
    - - け/犬 + ん/止 + selector 1 = 獗
    - - み/耳 + ん/止 + selector 1 = 蹶
  - - つ/土 + ん/止 + selector 1 = 坎
  - - そ/馬 + ん/止 + selector 1 = 歃
  - - 氷/氵 + ん/止 + selector 1 = 歇
    - - む/車 + ん/止 + selector 1 = 蠍
  - - ち/竹 + ん/止 + selector 1 = 篏
  - - も/門 + ん/止 + selector 1 = 闕
- - 火 + selector 1 = 熱
- - も/門 + selector 1 = 気
  - - も/門 + selector 1 + selector 1 = 气
    - - り/分 + も/門 + selector 1 = 氛
  - - も/門 + も/門 + selector 1 = 氣
    - - る/忄 + も/門 + selector 1 = 愾
- - そ/馬 + selector 1 = 牛
  - - そ/馬 + selector 1 + ん/止 = 牴
  - - れ/口 + そ/馬 + selector 1 = 吽
  - - う/宀/#3 + そ/馬 + selector 1 = 牢
  - - そ/馬 + の/禾 + selector 1 = 犂
- - へ/⺩ + selector 1 = 王
  - - も/門 + へ/⺩ + selector 1 = 匡
    - - ち/竹 + へ/⺩ + selector 1 = 筐
  - - て/扌 + へ/⺩ + selector 1 = 抂
  - - 日 + へ/⺩ + selector 1 = 旺
  - - き/木 + へ/⺩ + selector 1 = 枉
  - - に/氵 + へ/⺩ + selector 1 = 汪
  - - へ/⺩ + 日 + selector 1 = 珀
- - 日 + selector 1 = 白
  - - し/巿 + 日 + selector 1 = 帛
  - - る/忄 + 日 + selector 1 = 怕
  - - き/木 + 日 + selector 1 = 槹
  - - け/犬 + 日 + selector 1 = 狛
  - - ひ/辶 + 日 + selector 1 = 皀
  - - 宿 + 日 + selector 1 = 皃
  - - や/疒 + 日 + selector 1 = 皚
  - - の/禾 + 日 + selector 1 = 粕
  - - く/艹 + 日 + selector 1 = 葩
  - - ね/示 + 日 + selector 1 = 袙
- - ま/石 + selector 1 = 立
  - - ま/石 + ま/石 + selector 1 = 竝
  - - て/扌 + ま/石 + selector 1 = 拉
  - - す/発 + ま/石 + selector 1 = 竪
  - - 心 + ま/石 + selector 1 = 苙
- - の/禾 + selector 1 = 米
  - - の/禾 + selector 1 + き/木 = 糂
  - - の/禾 + selector 1 + そ/馬 = 糟
  - - と/戸 + の/禾 + selector 1 = 屎
  - - す/発 + の/禾 + selector 1 = 粂
- - め/目 + selector 1 = 自
- - ふ/女 + selector 1 = 舟
  - - ふ/女 + selector 1 + そ/馬 = 艚
- - し/巿 + selector 1 = 色
- - む/車 + selector 1 = 虫
  - - れ/口 + む/車 + selector 1 = 嗤
- - ね/示 + selector 1 = 衣
  - - ね/示 + selector 1 + ん/止 = 祇
  - - ね/示 + selector 1 + よ/广 = 袤
  - - た/⽥ + ね/示 + selector 1 = 畩
  - - 宿 + ね/示 + selector 1 = 袞
  - - 龸 + ね/示 + selector 1 = 褻
- - selector 1 + ね/示 = 衷
- - た/⽥ + selector 1 = 谷
  - - や/疒 + た/⽥ + selector 1 = 峪
  - - ま/石 + た/⽥ + selector 1 = 硲
  - - め/目 + た/⽥ + selector 1 = 谺
  - - ゐ/幺 + た/⽥ + selector 1 = 谿
  - - ひ/辶 + た/⽥ + selector 1 = 逧
  - - さ/阝 + た/⽥ + selector 1 = 郤
- - み/耳 + selector 1 = 身
  - - み/耳 + selector 1 + ゐ/幺 = 躱
- - さ/阝 + selector 1 = 陸
- - ち/竹 + selector 1 = 雨
  - - 心 + ち/竹 + selector 1 = 樗
  - - き/木 + ち/竹 + selector 1 = 櫺
- - せ/食 + selector 1 = 鳥
  - - や/疒 + せ/食 + selector 1 = 嶋
  - - き/木 + せ/食 + selector 1 = 樢
  - - selector 4 + せ/食 + selector 1 = 鳫
  - - 宿 + せ/食 + selector 1 = 鳬
  - - ひ/辶 + せ/食 + selector 1 = 鶫
  - - め/目 + せ/食 + selector 1 = 鷆
  - - よ/广 + せ/食 + selector 1 = 鷸
  - - 龸 + せ/食 + selector 1 = 鷽
- - selector 1 + お/頁 = 丸
  - - ち/竹 + selector 1 + お/頁 = 笂
- - selector 1 + ゐ/幺 = 乃
  - - な/亻 + selector 1 + ゐ/幺 = 仍
  - - こ/子 + selector 1 + ゐ/幺 = 孕
  - - き/木 + selector 1 + ゐ/幺 = 朶
- - selector 1 + か/金 = 于
  - - れ/口 + selector 1 + か/金 = 吁
- - selector 1 + ま/石 = 亟
- - selector 1 + 龸 = 亠
  - - selector 1 + 龸 + れ/口 = 亰
  - - selector 1 + 比 + 龸 = 卞
- - selector 1 + 宿 = 元
  - - selector 1 + selector 1 + 宿 = 兀
  - - 宿 + selector 1 + 宿 = 冦
  - - う/宀/#3 + selector 1 + 宿 = 寇
  - - む/車 + selector 1 + 宿 = 翫
  - - 心 + selector 1 + 宿 = 芫
  - - さ/阝 + selector 1 + 宿 = 阮
- - selector 1 + さ/阝 = 卩
- - selector 1 + う/宀/#3 = 参
  - - selector 1 + selector 1 + う/宀/#3 = 參
    - - に/氵 + selector 1 + う/宀/#3 = 滲
    - - く/艹 + selector 1 + う/宀/#3 = 蔘
    - - そ/馬 + selector 1 + う/宀/#3 = 驂
  - - せ/食 + selector 1 + う/宀/#3 = 鯵
- - う/宀/#3 + selector 1 + selector 1 = 宀
  - - selector 1 + う/宀/#3 + て/扌 = 舉
- - selector 1 + ゑ/訁 = 叉
  - - て/扌 + selector 1 + ゑ/訁 = 扠
  - - か/金 + selector 1 + ゑ/訁 = 釵
  - - と/戸 + selector 1 + ゑ/訁 = 靫
- - selector 1 + け/犬 = 天
  - - な/亻 + selector 1 + け/犬 = 俣
  - - 日 + selector 1 + け/犬 = 昊
- - selector 1 + な/亻 = 意
  - - れ/口 + selector 1 + な/亻 = 噫
  - - 心 + selector 1 + な/亻 = 檍
- - selector 1 + こ/子 = 孑
- - selector 1 + の/禾 = 喬
- - selector 1 + す/発 = 巨
  - - 火 + selector 1 + す/発 = 炬
  - - の/禾 + selector 1 + す/発 = 秬
  - - く/艹 + selector 1 + す/発 = 苣
  - - か/金 + selector 1 + す/発 = 鉅
- - selector 1 + ゆ/彳 = 憂
  - - て/扌 + selector 1 + ゆ/彳 = 擾
- - selector 1 + を/貝 = 斥
  - - て/扌 + selector 1 + を/貝 = 拆
  - - に/氵 + selector 1 + を/貝 = 泝
- - selector 1 + そ/馬 = 曹
  - - き/木 + selector 1 + そ/馬 = 槽
- - selector 1 + に/氵 = 朮
- - selector 1 + ん/止 = 氏
  - - し/巿 + selector 1 + ん/止 = 帋
  - - ま/石 + selector 1 + ん/止 = 砥
  - - ⺼ + selector 1 + ん/止 = 胝
  - - 囗 + selector 1 + ん/止 = 觝
  - - え/訁 + selector 1 + ん/止 = 詆
- - selector 1 + き/木 = 甚
  - - 心 + selector 1 + き/木 = 椹
  - - に/氵 + selector 1 + き/木 = 湛
  - - ま/石 + selector 1 + き/木 = 碪
  - - か/金 + selector 1 + き/木 = 鍖
- - selector 1 + め/目 = 真
  - - selector 1 + selector 1 + め/目 = 眞
  - - れ/口 + selector 1 + め/目 = 嗔
  - - 心 + selector 1 + め/目 = 槙
  - - や/疒 + selector 1 + め/目 = 癲
  - - め/目 + selector 1 + め/目 = 瞋
- - selector 1 + よ/广 = 矛
  - - え/訁 + selector 1 + よ/广 = 譎
  - - る/忄 + selector 1 + よ/广 = 懋
- - selector 1 + ⺼ = 血
  - - に/氵 + selector 1 + ⺼ = 洫
  - - ぬ/力 + selector 1 + ⺼ = 衂
  - - そ/馬 + selector 1 + ⺼ = 衄
- - selector 1 + ひ/辶 = 雍
- - selector 1 + と/戸 = 髟
- - selector 1 + お/頁 + す/発 = 夐
- - selector 1 + の/禾 + き/木 = 乖
- - selector 1 + ろ/十 + 囗 = 冉
- - selector 1 + 宿 + ふ/女 = 冨
- - selector 1 + き/木 + ぬ/力 = 剌
- - selector 1 + selector 4 + ね/示 = 剱
- - selector 1 + 比 + ぬ/力 = 匆
- - selector 1 + 囗 + へ/⺩ = 囗
- - つ/土 + た/⽥ + selector 1 = 壑
- - selector 1 + う/宀/#3 + へ/⺩ = 寳
- - か/金 + 宿 + selector 1 = 巛
- - selector 1 + よ/广 + ろ/十 = 廰
- - selector 1 + 囗 + い/糹/#2 = 弍
- - selector 1 + ろ/十 + て/扌 = 愽
- - selector 1 + る/忄 + み/耳 = 懴
- - て/扌 + や/疒 + selector 1 = 攜
- - selector 1 + り/分 + ゑ/訁 = 敍
- - selector 1 + き/木 + 数 = 朿
- - き/木 + 火 + selector 1 = 杰
- - 心 + 心 + selector 1 = 櫻
- - selector 1 + 比 + は/辶 = 毋
- - selector 1 + 氷/氵 + け/犬 = 濳
- - や/疒 + ち/竹 + selector 1 = 癨
- - す/発 + 宿 + selector 1 = 癶
- - selector 1 + け/犬 + か/金 = 竒
- - ん/止 + ん/止 + selector 1 = 缺
- - き/木 + ま/石 + selector 1 = 蘖
- - selector 1 + 比 + に/氵 = 襾

==== Compounds of 一 ====
- 数 + #1 = 一

- - ふ/女 + 数 + selector 1 = 丕
- - selector 1 + る/忄 + #1 = 弌

==== Compounds of 亜 ====
- あ + selector 1 = 亜

- - あ + selector 1 + selector 1 = 亞
  - - あ + selector 1 + 心 = 惡
    - - か/金 + あ/亞 + 心 = 鐚
  - - か/金 + あ/亜 + selector 1 = 錏
  - - 心 + selector 1 + selector 1 = 椏
  - - つ/土 + 龸 + あ/亞 = 壺
  - - あ/亞 + つ/土 = 堊
- - れ/口 + あ/亜 = 唖
- - つ/土 + 宿 + あ/亜 = 壷
- - あ/亜 + 心 = 悪
