= Braille pattern dots-4 =

Braille pattern

6-dot braille cells
⠀	⠁	⠃	⠉	⠙	⠑	⠋	⠛	⠓	⠊	⠚	⠈	⠘
⠄	⠅	⠇	⠍	⠝	⠕	⠏	⠟	⠗	⠎	⠞	⠌	⠜
⠤	⠥	⠧	⠭	⠽	⠵	⠯	⠿	⠷	⠮	⠾	⠬	⠼
⠠	⠡	⠣	⠩	⠹	⠱	⠫	⠻	⠳	⠪	⠺	⠨	⠸
shift down	⠂	⠆	⠒	⠲	⠢	⠖	⠶	⠦	⠔	⠴	⠐	⠰

The Braille pattern dots-4 ( ⠈ ) is a 6-dot or 8-dot braille cell with the top right dot raised. It is represented by the Unicode code point U+2808, and in Braille ASCII with the "at" sign: @.

Character information
Preview	⠈ (braille pattern dots-4)	
Unicode name	BRAILLE PATTERN DOTS-4	
Encodings	decimal	hex
Unicode	10248	U+2808
UTF-8	226 160 136	E2 A0 88
Numeric character reference	&#10248;	&#x2808;
Braille ASCII	64	40

== Unified Braille ==
In unified international braille, the braille pattern dots-4 is used as a formatting indicator, accent mark, or punctuation.

=== Table of unified braille values ===
French Braille	superscript sign, ar
English Braille	accent/punctuation composition
Bharati Braille	virama/halant
IPA Braille	superscript
Slovak Braille	Ä, @
Arabic Braille	abbreviation indicator

== Other braille ==
Japanese Braille	yōon
Korean Braille	g- / ㄱ
Taiwanese Braille	tone 3
Two-Cell Chinese Braille	homophone discriminator
Nemeth Braille	not an independent sign

== Plus dots 7 and 8 ==
Related to Braille pattern dots-4 are Braille patterns 47, 48, and 478, which are used in 8-dot braille systems, such as Gardner-Salinas and Luxembourgish Braille.

Character information
Preview	⡈ (braille pattern dots-47)		⢈ (braille pattern dots-48)		⣈ (braille pattern dots-478)	
Unicode name	BRAILLE PATTERN DOTS-47		BRAILLE PATTERN DOTS-48		BRAILLE PATTERN DOTS-478	
Encodings	decimal	hex	dec	hex	dec	hex
Unicode	10312	U+2848	10376	U+2888	10440	U+28C8
UTF-8	226 161 136	E2 A1 88	226 162 136	E2 A2 88	226 163 136	E2 A3 88
Numeric character reference	&#10312;	&#x2848;	&#10376;	&#x2888;	&#10440;	&#x28C8;

	dots 47	dots 48	dots 478
Gardner Salinas Braille	script indicator		definable font indicator

== Related 8-dot kantenji patterns ==
In the Japanese kantenji braille, the standard 8-dot Braille patterns 5, 15, 45, and 145 are the patterns related to Braille pattern dots-4, since the two additional dots of kantenji patterns 04, 47, and 047 are placed above the base 6-dot cell, instead of below, as in standard 8-dot braille.

Character information
Preview	⠐ (braille pattern dots-5)		⠑ (braille pattern dots-15)		⠘ (braille pattern dots-45)		⠙ (braille pattern dots-145)	
Unicode name	BRAILLE PATTERN DOTS-5		BRAILLE PATTERN DOTS-15		BRAILLE PATTERN DOTS-45		BRAILLE PATTERN DOTS-145	
Encodings	decimal	hex	dec	hex	dec	hex	dec	hex
Unicode	10256	U+2810	10257	U+2811	10264	U+2818	10265	U+2819
UTF-8	226 160 144	E2 A0 90	226 160 145	E2 A0 91	226 160 152	E2 A0 98	226 160 153	E2 A0 99
Numeric character reference	&#10256;	&#x2810;	&#10257;	&#x2811;	&#10264;	&#x2818;	&#10265;	&#x2819;

=== Kantenji using braille patterns 5, 15, 45, or 145 ===
This listing includes kantenji using Braille pattern dots-4 for all 6349 kanji found in JIS C 6226-1978.

- - N/A - used only as a selector

==== Selector ====
- - 宿 + selector 4 = 与
  - - 宿 + 宿 + selector 4 = 與
    - - や/疒 + 宿 + selector 4 = 嶼
    - - ん/止 + 宿 + selector 4 = 歟
- - く/艹 + selector 4 = 丘
  - - む/車 + く/艹 + selector 4 = 蚯
  - - さ/阝 + く/艹 + selector 4 = 邱
  - - そ/馬 + く/艹 + selector 4 = 駈
- - ち/竹 + selector 4 = 両
  - - ち/竹 + selector 4 + い/糹/#2 = 霍
  - - ち/竹 + selector 4 + 火 = 霏
  - - ち/竹 + ち/竹 + selector 4 = 兩
    - - な/亻 + ち/竹 + selector 4 = 倆
    - - ね/示 + ち/竹 + selector 4 = 裲
    - - む/車 + ち/竹 + selector 4 = 輛
    - - お/頁 + ち/竹 + selector 4 = 魎
- - ふ/女 + selector 4 = 丹
  - - ほ/方 + ふ/女 + selector 4 = 旃
  - - 心 + ふ/女 + selector 4 = 栴
- - た/⽥ + selector 4 = 由
  - - ふ/女 + た/⽥ + selector 4 = 舳
  - - や/疒 + た/⽥ + selector 4 = 岫
  - - は/辶 + た/⽥ + selector 4 = 廸
  - - 心 + た/⽥ + selector 4 = 柚
  - - い/糹/#2 + た/⽥ + selector 4 = 紬
  - - む/車 + た/⽥ + selector 4 = 蚰
  - - ひ/辶 + た/⽥ + selector 4 = 迪
  - - の/禾 + た/⽥ + selector 4 = 釉
  - - そ/馬 + た/⽥ + selector 4 = 騁
- - す/発 + selector 4 = 久
  - - す/発 + selector 4 + selector 4 = 夂
    - - か/金 + す/発 + selector 4 = 鑁
  - - き/木 + す/発 + selector 4 = 柩
  - - へ/⺩ + す/発 + selector 4 = 玖
  - - や/疒 + す/発 + selector 4 = 疚
- - そ/馬 + selector 4 = 午
  - - る/忄 + そ/馬 + selector 4 = 忤
  - - き/木 + そ/馬 + selector 4 = 杵
  - - selector 4 + selector 4 + そ/馬 = 彖
- - れ/口 + selector 4 = 味
- - つ/土 + selector 4 = 域
- - う/宀/#3 + selector 4 = 宙
  - - selector 4 + selector 4 + う/宀/#3 = 彡
- - か/金 + selector 4 = 州
  - - に/氵 + か/金 + selector 4 = 洲
  - - そ/馬 + か/金 + selector 4 = 駲
- - ゐ/幺 + selector 4 = 幻
- - ゆ/彳 + selector 4 = 引
  - - や/疒 + ゆ/彳 + selector 4 = 矧
  - - む/車 + ゆ/彳 + selector 4 = 蚓
- - 囗 + selector 4 = 或
  - - も/門 + 囗 + selector 4 = 閾
- - ろ/十 + selector 4 = 才
  - - け/犬 + ろ/十 + selector 4 = 犲
- - 日 + selector 4 = 旧
  - - 日 + 日 + selector 4 = 舊
- - て/扌 + selector 4 = 抽
- - き/木 + selector 4 = 未
  - - う/宀/#3 + き/木 + selector 4 = 寐
  - - 日 + き/木 + selector 4 = 昧
  - - め/目 + き/木 + selector 4 = 眛
- - 比 + selector 4 = 此
  - - れ/口 + 比 + selector 4 = 呰
  - - や/疒 + 比 + selector 4 = 疵
  - - め/目 + 比 + selector 4 = 眦
  - - 囗 + 比 + selector 4 = 觜
  - - を/貝 + 比 + selector 4 = 貲
- - 氷/氵 + selector 4 = 永
  - - れ/口 + 氷/氵 + selector 4 = 咏
  - - る/忄 + 氷/氵 + selector 4 = 怺
  - - 日 + 氷/氵 + selector 4 = 昶
  - - ⺼ + 氷/氵 + selector 4 = 脉
- - に/氵 + selector 4 = 泳
- - の/禾 + selector 4 = 稲
  - - の/禾 + の/禾 + selector 4 = 稻
- - ね/示 + selector 4 = 袖
- - ゑ/訁 + selector 4 = 詠
- - は/辶 + selector 4 = 赱
- - ひ/辶 + selector 4 = 道
- - せ/食 + selector 4 = 酸
- - め/目 + selector 4 = 面
  - - に/氵 + め/目 + selector 4 = 湎
  - - い/糹/#2 + め/目 + selector 4 = 緬
  - - よ/广 + め/目 + selector 4 = 靨
  - - す/発 + め/目 + selector 4 = 麺
- - お/頁 + selector 4 = 首
  - - 囗 + お/頁 + selector 4 = 馘
- - け/犬 + selector 4 = 鼬
- - selector 4 + ふ/女 = 不
  - - つ/土 + selector 4 + ふ/女 = 坏
  - - て/扌 + selector 4 + ふ/女 = 抔
  - - す/発 + selector 4 + ふ/女 = 罘
  - - ⺼ + selector 4 + ふ/女 = 胚
- - selector 4 + や/疒 = 乎
- - selector 4 + ち/竹 = 也
  - - か/金 + selector 4 + ち/竹 = 釶
  - - と/戸 + selector 4 + ち/竹 = 髢
- - selector 4 + ま/石 = 了
- - selector 4 + よ/广 = 予
  - - て/扌 + selector 4 + よ/广 = 抒
  - - き/木 + selector 4 + よ/广 = 杼
  - - り/分 + selector 4 + よ/广 = 舒
  - - selector 4 + selector 4 + よ/广 = 豫
  - - selector 4 + selector 4 + よ/广 = 豫
- - selector 4 + え/訁 = 亦
- - selector 4 + も/門 = 以
  - - 心 + selector 4 + も/門 = 苡
- - selector 4 + 宿 = 儿
- - selector 4 + こ/子 = 共
  - - れ/口 + selector 4 + こ/子 = 哄
  - - て/扌 + selector 4 + こ/子 = 拱
  - - に/氵 + selector 4 + こ/子 = 洪
  - - む/車 + selector 4 + こ/子 = 蛬
- - selector 4 + き/木 = 其
  - - に/氵 + selector 4 + き/木 = 淇
  - - ね/示 + selector 4 + き/木 = 祺
  - - の/禾 + selector 4 + き/木 = 稘
  - - ち/竹 + selector 4 + き/木 = 箕
  - - そ/馬 + selector 4 + き/木 = 騏
- - selector 4 + へ/⺩ = 冊
  - - selector 4 + selector 4 + へ/⺩ = 册
- - selector 4 + 龸 = 凡
  - - き/木 + selector 4 + 龸 = 梵
  - - に/氵 + selector 4 + 龸 = 汎
- - selector 4 + ぬ/力 = 刀
  - - れ/口 + selector 4 + ぬ/力 = 叨
  - - や/疒 + selector 4 + ぬ/力 = 屶
  - - て/扌 + selector 4 + ぬ/力 = 挈
  - - き/木 + selector 4 + ぬ/力 = 朷
  - - 心 + selector 4 + ぬ/力 = 茘
  - - か/金 + selector 4 + ぬ/力 = 釖
- - selector 4 + ね/示 = 剣
  - - selector 1 + selector 4 + ね/示 = 剱
  - - selector 4 + selector 4 + ね/示 = 劍
  - - selector 6 + selector 4 + ね/示 = 劒
  - - selector 5 + selector 4 + ね/示 = 劔
- - selector 4 + 数 = 勿
  - - ぬ/力 + selector 4 + 数 = 刎
  - - 日 + selector 4 + 数 = 昜
  - - ち/竹 + selector 4 + 数 = 笏
- - selector 4 + さ/阝 = 印
- - selector 4 + ゑ/訁 = 又
  - - う/宀/#3 + selector 4 + ゑ/訁 = 攴
  - - 火 + selector 4 + ゑ/訁 = 燮
- - selector 4 + ゐ/幺 = 及
  - - や/疒 + selector 4 + ゐ/幺 = 岌
  - - に/氵 + selector 4 + ゐ/幺 = 汲
  - - ち/竹 + selector 4 + ゐ/幺 = 笈
- - selector 4 + な/亻 = 台
  - - る/忄 + selector 4 + な/亻 = 怡
  - - ち/竹 + selector 4 + な/亻 = 笞
  - - い/糹/#2 + selector 4 + な/亻 = 紿
  - - え/訁 + selector 4 + な/亻 = 詒
  - - を/貝 + selector 4 + な/亻 = 貽
  - - そ/馬 + selector 4 + な/亻 = 駘
  - - selector 4 + selector 4 + な/亻 = 臺
    - - て/扌 + selector 4 + な/亻 = 擡
    - - く/艹 + selector 4 + な/亻 = 薹
    - - selector 4 + selector 4 + な/亻 = 臺
- - selector 4 + 仁/亻 = 司
  - - ち/竹 + selector 4 + 仁/亻 = 笥
  - - selector 4 + selector 4 + 仁/亻 = 旡
- - selector 4 + み/耳 = 哉
- - selector 4 + け/犬 = 夭
- - selector 4 + て/扌 = 専
  - - selector 4 + selector 4 + て/扌 = 專
    - - て/扌 + selector 4 + て/扌 = 摶
    - - き/木 + selector 4 + て/扌 = 槫
    - - ま/石 + selector 4 + て/扌 = 磚
    - - か/金 + selector 4 + て/扌 = 甎
  - - 心 + selector 4 + て/扌 = 榑
  - - に/氵 + selector 4 + て/扌 = 溥
  - - を/貝 + selector 4 + て/扌 = 賻
- - selector 4 + か/金 = 干
  - - 日 + selector 4 + か/金 = 旱
    - - て/扌 + selector 4 + か/金 = 捍
    - - の/禾 + selector 4 + か/金 = 稈
  - - き/木 + selector 4 + か/金 = 栞
  - - す/発 + selector 4 + か/金 = 罕
- - selector 4 + つ/土 = 庄
  - - selector 4 + selector 4 + つ/土 = 甬
  - - を/貝 + selector 4 + つ/土 = 賍
- - selector 4 + 囗 = 戈
  - - を/貝 + selector 4 + 囗 = 戝
  - - ろ/十 + selector 4 + 囗 = 戟
- - む/車 + selector 4 + 囗 = 戮
  - - や/疒 + selector 4 + 囗 = 戳
  - - て/扌 + selector 4 + 囗 = 找
  - - き/木 + selector 4 + 囗 = 棧
  - - ち/竹 + selector 4 + 囗 = 箋
  - - selector 4 + 囗 + い/糹/#2 = 貮
- - selector 4 + 氷/氵 = 改
  - - selector 4 + selector 4 + 氷/氵 = 攵
- - selector 4 + ほ/方 = 旁
  - - 心 + selector 4 + ほ/方 = 蒡
- - selector 4 + 日 = 旦
  - - つ/土 + selector 4 + 日 = 坦
  - - ふ/女 + selector 4 + 日 = 妲
  - - る/忄 + selector 4 + 日 = 怛
  - - や/疒 + selector 4 + 日 = 疸
  - - ね/示 + selector 4 + 日 = 袒
  - - と/戸 + selector 4 + 日 = 靼
- - selector 4 + に/氵 = 旨
  - - と/戸 + selector 4 + に/氵 = 耆
- - selector 4 + そ/馬 = 曽
- - selector 4 + の/禾 = 段
  - - selector 4 + selector 4 + の/禾 = 殳
  - - き/木 + selector 4 + の/禾 = 椴
  - - い/糹/#2 + selector 4 + の/禾 = 緞
  - - 心 + selector 4 + の/禾 = 葮
- - selector 4 + せ/食 = 毛
  - - ほ/方 + selector 4 + せ/食 = 旄
  - - せ/食 + selector 4 + せ/食 = 毳
  - - 囗 + selector 4 + せ/食 = 氈
  - - か/金 + selector 4 + せ/食 = 瓱
  - - と/戸 + selector 4 + せ/食 = 耄
  - - ま/石 + selector 4 + せ/食 = 麾
  - - selector 4 + せ/食 + selector 1 = 鳫
- - selector 4 + め/目 = 牙
  - - れ/口 + selector 4 + め/目 = 呀
- - selector 4 + る/忄 = 甘
  - - つ/土 + selector 4 + る/忄 = 坩
  - - て/扌 + selector 4 + る/忄 = 拑
  - - 心 + selector 4 + る/忄 = 柑
  - - 龸 + selector 4 + る/忄 = 甞
  - - や/疒 + selector 4 + る/忄 = 疳
  - - ち/竹 + selector 4 + る/忄 = 箝
  - - む/車 + selector 4 + る/忄 = 蚶
  - - さ/阝 + selector 4 + る/忄 = 邯
  - - せ/食 + selector 4 + る/忄 = 酣
  - - か/金 + selector 4 + る/忄 = 鉗
- - selector 4 + ひ/辶 = 皮
  - - つ/土 + selector 4 + ひ/辶 = 坡
  - - て/扌 + selector 4 + ひ/辶 = 披
  - - へ/⺩ + selector 4 + ひ/辶 = 玻
  - - む/車 + selector 4 + ひ/辶 = 皴
  - - 宿 + selector 4 + ひ/辶 = 皸
  - - も/門 + selector 4 + ひ/辶 = 皺
  - - ち/竹 + selector 4 + ひ/辶 = 簸
  - - さ/阝 + selector 4 + ひ/辶 = 陂
  - - と/戸 + selector 4 + ひ/辶 = 鞁
- - selector 4 + ⺼ = 皿
  - - ふ/女 + selector 4 + ⺼ = 盃
- - selector 4 + ん/止 = 缶
- - selector 4 + す/発 = 臣
  - - う/宀/#3 + selector 4 + す/発 = 宦
- - selector 4 + ゆ/彳 = 至
  - - れ/口 + selector 4 + ゆ/彳 = 咥
  - - つ/土 + selector 4 + ゆ/彳 = 垤
  - - ふ/女 + selector 4 + ゆ/彳 = 姪
  - - き/木 + selector 4 + ゆ/彳 = 桎
  - - と/戸 + selector 4 + ゆ/彳 = 耋
  - - む/車 + selector 4 + ゆ/彳 = 蛭
  - - selector 4 + selector 4 + ゆ/彳 = 隶
- - selector 4 + む/車 = 蜀
  - - み/耳 + selector 4 + む/車 = 躅
- - selector 4 + ろ/十 = 辰
  - - う/宀/#3 + selector 4 + ろ/十 = 宸
  - - 日 + selector 4 + ろ/十 = 晨
  - - ⺼ + selector 4 + ろ/十 = 脣
- - selector 4 + と/戸 = 長
  - - る/忄 + selector 4 + と/戸 = 悵
  - - 心 + selector 4 + と/戸 = 萇
- - selector 4 + い/糹/#2 = 離
  - - に/氵 + selector 4 + い/糹/#2 = 漓
  - - へ/⺩ + selector 4 + い/糹/#2 = 璃
  - - お/頁 + selector 4 + い/糹/#2 = 魑
  - - の/禾 + selector 4 + い/糹/#2 = 黐
  - - selector 4 + selector 4 + い/糹/#2 = 隹
    - - う/宀/#3 + selector 4 + い/糹/#2 = 寉
    - - 囗 + selector 4 + い/糹/#2 = 雕
- - selector 4 + 火 = 非
  - - も/門 + selector 4 + 火 = 匪
  - - と/戸 + selector 4 + 火 = 扉
  - - 日 + selector 4 + 火 = 暃
  - - へ/⺩ + selector 4 + 火 = 琲
  - - ⺼ + selector 4 + 火 = 腓
  - - 心 + selector 4 + 火 = 菲
  - - む/車 + selector 4 + 火 = 蜚
  - - ね/示 + selector 4 + 火 = 裴
  - - せ/食 + selector 4 + 火 = 鯡
  - - 龸 + selector 4 + 火 = 韭
    - - さ/阝 + selector 4 + 火 = 齏
- - 龸 + selector 4 + く/艹 = 毓
- - selector 4 + へ/⺩ + に/氵 = 毬
- - selector 4 + へ/⺩ + 比 = 獎
- - て/扌 + の/禾 + selector 4 = 秉
- - selector 4 + む/車 + う/宀/#3 = 軣
- - selector 4 + む/車 + と/戸 = 辧
