= Braille pattern dots-45 =

Braille pattern

6-dot braille cells
⠀	⠁	⠃	⠉	⠙	⠑	⠋	⠛	⠓	⠊	⠚	⠈	⠘
⠄	⠅	⠇	⠍	⠝	⠕	⠏	⠟	⠗	⠎	⠞	⠌	⠜
⠤	⠥	⠧	⠭	⠽	⠵	⠯	⠿	⠷	⠮	⠾	⠬	⠼
⠠	⠡	⠣	⠩	⠹	⠱	⠫	⠻	⠳	⠪	⠺	⠨	⠸
shift down	⠂	⠆	⠒	⠲	⠢	⠖	⠶	⠦	⠔	⠴	⠐	⠰

The Braille pattern dots-45 ( ⠘ ) is a 6-dot braille cell with the top and middle right dots raised, or an 8-dot braille cell with the top and upper middle right dots raised. It is represented by the Unicode code point U+2818, and in Braille ASCII with a caret: ^.

Character information
Preview	⠘ (braille pattern dots-45)	
Unicode name	BRAILLE PATTERN DOTS-45	
Encodings	decimal	hex
Unicode	10264	U+2818
UTF-8	226 160 152	E2 A0 98
Numeric character reference	&#10264;	&#x2818;
Braille ASCII	94	5E

== Unified Braille ==
In unified international braille, the braille pattern dots-45 is used as a format or abbreviation sign, or as otherwise needed.

=== Table of unified braille values ===
French Braille	currency sign, bl, -able
English Braille	abbreviation sign
German Braille	-ig
Bharati Braille	भ / ਭ / ભ / ভ / ଭ / భ / ಭ / ഭ / භ / بھ
Slovak Braille	Greek sign

== Other braille ==
Japanese Braille	yōon + dakuten
Korean Braille	b- / ㅂ
Taiwanese Braille	yuan, -üan / ㄩㄢ
Nemeth Braille	superscript mark

== Plus dots 7 and 8 ==
Related to Braille pattern dots-45 are Braille patterns 457, 458, and 4578, which are used in 8-dot braille systems, such as Gardner-Salinas and Luxembourgish Braille.

Character information
Preview	⡘ (braille pattern dots-457)		⢘ (braille pattern dots-458)		⣘ (braille pattern dots-4578)	
Unicode name	BRAILLE PATTERN DOTS-457		BRAILLE PATTERN DOTS-458		BRAILLE PATTERN DOTS-4578	
Encodings	decimal	hex	dec	hex	dec	hex
Unicode	10328	U+2858	10392	U+2898	10456	U+28D8
UTF-8	226 161 152	E2 A1 98	226 162 152	E2 A2 98	226 163 152	E2 A3 98
Numeric character reference	&#10328;	&#x2858;	&#10392;	&#x2898;	&#10456;	&#x28D8;

	dots 457	dots 458	dots 4578
Gardner Salinas Braille	) (close parenthesis)	bold indicator	fractur indicator

== Related 8-dot kantenji patterns ==
In the Japanese kantenji braille, the standard 8-dot Braille patterns 56, 156, 456, and 1456 are the patterns related to Braille pattern dots-45, since the two additional dots of kantenji patterns 045, 457, and 0457 are placed above the base 6-dot cell, instead of below, as in standard 8-dot braille.

Character information
Preview	⠰ (braille pattern dots-56)		⠱ (braille pattern dots-156)		⠸ (braille pattern dots-456)		⠹ (braille pattern dots-1456)	
Unicode name	BRAILLE PATTERN DOTS-56		BRAILLE PATTERN DOTS-156		BRAILLE PATTERN DOTS-456		BRAILLE PATTERN DOTS-1456	
Encodings	decimal	hex	dec	hex	dec	hex	dec	hex
Unicode	10288	U+2830	10289	U+2831	10296	U+2838	10297	U+2839
UTF-8	226 160 176	E2 A0 B0	226 160 177	E2 A0 B1	226 160 184	E2 A0 B8	226 160 185	E2 A0 B9
Numeric character reference	&#10288;	&#x2830;	&#10289;	&#x2831;	&#10296;	&#x2838;	&#10297;	&#x2839;

=== Kantenji using braille patterns 56, 156, 456, or 1456 ===
This listing includes kantenji using Braille pattern dots-45 for all 6349 kanji found in JIS C 6226-1978.

- - 比

==== Variants and thematic compounds ====
===== Variants =====
- - 比 + selector 4 = 此

===== Directional thematic compounds =====
- - 比 + う/宀/#3 = 上
- - 比 + 龸 = 下
- - 比 + 宿 = 中
- - 比 + 数 = 右
- - 比 + ゐ/幺 = 左
- - 比 + き/木 = 北
- - 比 + み/耳 = 南
- - 比 + ひ/辶 = 東
- - 比 + に/氵 = 西

===== Other thematic compounds =====
- - 比 + は/辶 = 母
  - - selector 1 + 比 + は/辶 = 毋
- - 比 + な/亻 = 入
- - 比 + へ/⺩ = 出
- - 比 + ⺼ = 互
- - 比 + ら/月 = 亙
- - 比 + れ/口 = 凸
- - 比 + 囗 = 凹
- - 比 + や/疒 = 良
- - 比 + つ/土 = 貫
- - 比 + け/犬 = 大
- - 比 + そ/馬 = 小
- - 比 + た/⽥ = 尺
- - 比 + ふ/女 = 屯
- - 比 + と/戸 = 斗
- - 比 + を/貝 = 斤
- - 比 + く/艹 = 升
- - 比 + 火 = 丈
- - 比 + も/門 = 勺
- - 比 + ぬ/力 = 匁
  - - selector 1 + 比 + ぬ/力 = 匆
- - 比 + り/分 = 里
- - 比 + え/訁 = 高
- - 比 + か/金 = 可
- - 比 + め/目 = 亀

==== Compounds of 比 ====
- - ふ/女 + 比 = 妣
- - と/戸 + 比 = 屁
- - よ/广 + 比 = 庇
- - て/扌 + 比 = 批
- - 日 + 比 = 昆
  - - き/木 + 日 + 比 = 棍
  - - 火 + 日 + 比 = 焜
  - - ち/竹 + 日 + 比 = 箟
  - - 心 + 日 + 比 = 菎
  - - せ/食 + 日 + 比 = 鯤
  - - に/氵 + 比 = 混
- - た/⽥ + 比 = 毘
- - 比 + 日 = 皆
  - - て/扌 + 比 + 日 = 揩
  - - き/木 + 比 + 日 = 楷
  - - な/亻 + 比 + 日 = 偕
  - - え/訁 + 比 + 日 = 諧
- - そ/馬 + 比 = 鹿
  - - つ/土 + そ/馬 + 比 = 塵
  - - に/氵 + そ/馬 + 比 = 漉
  - - む/車 + そ/馬 + 比 = 轆
  - - か/金 + そ/馬 + 比 = 鏖
  - - く/艹 + そ/馬 + 比 = 麁
  - - へ/⺩ + そ/馬 + 比 = 麈
  - - の/禾 + そ/馬 + 比 = 麋
  - - こ/子 + そ/馬 + 比 = 麌
  - - き/木 + そ/馬 + 比 = 麓
  - - 囗 + そ/馬 + 比 = 麕
- - 囗 + 比 = 麗
  - - な/亻 + 囗 + 比 = 儷
  - - に/氵 + 囗 + 比 = 灑
  - - そ/馬 + 囗 + 比 = 驪
- - や/疒 + う/宀/#3 + 比 = 崑
- - 心 + 龸 + 比 = 枇
- - へ/⺩ + 宿 + 比 = 琵
- - ま/石 + 宿 + 比 = 砒
- - の/禾 + 宿 + 比 = 秕
- - ち/竹 + 宿 + 比 = 箆
- - ち/竹 + 龸 + 比 = 篦
- - の/禾 + う/宀/#3 + 比 = 粃
- - い/糹/#2 + 宿 + 比 = 紕
- - 心 + 宿 + 比 = 蓖
- - そ/馬 + 宿 + 比 = 豼
- - そ/馬 + 龸 + 比 = 貔

==== Compounds of 此 ====
- - き/木 + 比 = 柴
- - ま/石 + 比 = 砦
- - 比 + 比 = 些
- - 比 + い/糹/#2 = 雌
- - を/貝 + 比 + selector 4 = 貲
- - 囗 + 比 + selector 4 = 觜
- - や/疒 + 比 + selector 4 = 疵
- - め/目 + 比 + selector 4 = 眦
- - れ/口 + 比 + selector 4 = 呰
- - め/目 + 宿 + 比 = 眥

==== Compounds of 上, 下, and 中 ====
- - selector 1 + 比 + 龸 = 卞
- - つ/土 + 比 + 龸 = 圷
- - つ/土 + 比 + う/宀/#3 = 垰
- - て/扌 + 比 + 龸 = 抃
- - き/木 + 比 + 龸 = 梺
- - も/門 + 比 + 龸 = 閇
- - ち/竹 + 比 + 龸 = 雫
- - け/犬 + 比 + 宿 = 狆
- - ひ/辶 + 比 + 宿 = 迚

==== Compounds of 右, 左, 北, 南, 東, and 西 ====
- - な/亻 + 比 + 数 = 佑
- - せ/食 + 比 + 数 = 醢
- - selector 1 + 比 + に/氵 = 襾
- - れ/口 + 比 + み/耳 = 喃
- - 心 + 比 + み/耳 = 楠
- - ひ/辶 + 比 + み/耳 = 遖
- - て/扌 + 比 + ひ/辶 = 揀
- - き/木 + 比 + ひ/辶 = 棟
- - 心 + 比 + ひ/辶 = 楝
- - ゑ/訁 + 比 + ひ/辶 = 諫
- - せ/食 + 比 + ひ/辶 = 鰊
- - れ/口 + 比 + に/氵 = 哂
- - つ/土 + 比 + に/氵 = 堙
- - は/辶 + 比 + に/氵 = 廼
- - き/木 + 比 + に/氵 = 栖
- - に/氵 + 比 + に/氵 = 湮
- - か/金 + 比 + に/氵 = 甄
- - ひ/辶 + 比 + に/氵 = 迺

==== Compounds of 母 and 毋 ====
- - 心 + 比 = 苺
- - ふ/女 + 比 + は/辶 = 姆
- - て/扌 + 比 + は/辶 = 拇
- - 心 + 比 + は/辶 = 栂
- - ね/示 + 比 + は/辶 = 袰

==== Compounds of 入 and 出 ====
- - れ/口 + 比 + な/亻 = 叺
- - つ/土 + 比 + な/亻 = 圦
- - き/木 + 比 + な/亻 = 杁
- - れ/口 + 比 + へ/⺩ = 咄
- - ら/月 + 比 + へ/⺩ = 朏
- - き/木 + 比 + へ/⺩ = 柮
- - ね/示 + 比 + へ/⺩ = 祟
- - の/禾 + 比 + へ/⺩ = 糶
- - し/巿 + 比 + へ/⺩ = 黜

==== Compounds of 互, 亙, 凸, 凹, 良, 貫, 可, 大, 小, 尺, 屯, 斗, 斤, 升, 丈, 勺, and 匁 ====
- - 氷/氵 + 比 + ⺼ = 冱
- - に/氵 + 比 + ⺼ = 沍
- - ら/月 + 比 + や/疒 = 朖
- - へ/⺩ + 比 + や/疒 = 琅
- - の/禾 + 比 + や/疒 = 粮
- - 心 + 比 + や/疒 = 莨
- - み/耳 + 比 + や/疒 = 踉
- - き/木 + 比 + つ/土 = 樌
- - え/訁 + 比 + け/犬 = 奕
- - せ/食 + 比 + け/犬 = 奠
- - そ/馬 + 比 + け/犬 = 尖
- - さ/阝 + 比 + そ/馬 = 隙
- - れ/口 + 比 + た/⽥ = 呎
- - か/金 + 比 + た/⽥ = 鈬
- - に/氵 + 比 + ふ/女 = 沌
- - か/金 + 比 + ふ/女 = 瓲
- - さ/阝 + 比 + ふ/女 = 邨
- - せ/食 + 比 + ふ/女 = 飩
- - て/扌 + 比 + と/戸 = 抖
- - 囗 + 比 + と/戸 = 斛
- - も/門 + 比 + と/戸 = 斟
- - む/車 + 比 + と/戸 = 蚪
- - れ/口 + 比 + を/貝 = 听
- - つ/土 + 比 + を/貝 = 圻
- - る/忄 + 比 + を/貝 = 忻
- - に/氵 + 比 + を/貝 = 沂
- - か/金 + 比 + を/貝 = 釿
- - き/木 + 比 + く/艹 = 枡
- - な/亻 + 比 + 火 = 仗
- - ふ/女 + 比 + も/門 = 妁
- - き/木 + 比 + も/門 = 杓
- - 火 + 比 + も/門 = 灼
- - 心 + 比 + も/門 = 芍
- - せ/食 + 比 + も/門 = 酌

==== Compounds of 里, 高, 可, and 亀 ====
- - た/⽥ + 比 + ⺼ = 疉
- - い/糹/#2 + 比 + 囗 = 雋
- - な/亻 + 比 + り/分 = 俚
- - れ/口 + 比 + り/分 = 哩
- - に/氵 + 比 + り/分 = 浬
- - け/犬 + 比 + り/分 = 狸
- - ね/示 + 比 + り/分 = 裡
- - そ/馬 + 比 + り/分 = 貍
- - ち/竹 + 比 + り/分 = 霾
- - れ/口 + 比 + え/訁 = 嚆
- - つ/土 + 比 + え/訁 = 塙
- - や/疒 + 比 + え/訁 = 嵩
- - は/辶 + 比 + え/訁 = 敲
- - き/木 + 比 + え/訁 = 槁
- - そ/馬 + 比 + え/訁 = 犒
- - の/禾 + 比 + え/訁 = 稾
- - 心 + 比 + え/訁 = 蒿
- - か/金 + 比 + え/訁 = 鎬
- - う/宀/#3 + 比 + え/訁 = 髞
- - か/金 + 比 + か/金 = 哥
  - - ゆ/彳 + 比 + か/金 = 彁
- - き/木 + 比 + か/金 = 柯
- - へ/⺩ + 比 + か/金 = 珂
- - ふ/女 + 比 + か/金 = 舸
- - く/艹 + 比 + か/金 = 苛
  - - に/氵 + 比 + か/金 = 渮
- - え/訁 + 比 + か/金 = 訶
- - む/車 + 比 + か/金 = 軻
- - の/禾 + 比 + め/目 = 穐
- - ほ/方 + 比 + め/目 = 鼇
- - 氷/氵 + 比 + め/目 = 鼈
- - 比 + 比 + め/目 = 龜
  - - も/門 + 比 + め/目 = 鬮

==== Other compounds ====
- - ⺼ + 比 = 肘
- - 比 + ん/止 = 低
- - 仁/亻 + 比 = 化
  - - く/艹 + 比 = 花
    - - つ/土 + く/艹 + 比 = 埖
    - - き/木 + く/艹 + 比 = 椛
    - - ま/石 + く/艹 + 比 = 硴
    - - の/禾 + く/艹 + 比 = 糀
    - - か/金 + く/艹 + 比 = 錵
  - - を/貝 + 比 = 貨
  - - え/訁 + 仁/亻 + 比 = 訛
  - - と/戸 + 仁/亻 + 比 = 靴
- - へ/⺩ + 比 = 奨
  - - selector 4 + へ/⺩ + 比 = 獎
  - - へ/⺩ + へ/⺩ + 比 = 奬
- - 比 + ゆ/彳 = 優
- - 比 + せ/食 = 鶴
- - れ/口 + 比 + し/巿 = 吋
- - ろ/十 + 比 + し/巿 = 尅
- - る/忄 + 比 + し/巿 = 忖
- - の/禾 + 比 + な/亻 = 糴
- - い/糹/#2 + 比 + し/巿 = 紂
- - せ/食 + 比 + し/巿 = 酎
