= Braille pattern dots-3456 =

Braille pattern

6-dot braille cells
⠀	⠁	⠃	⠉	⠙	⠑	⠋	⠛	⠓	⠊	⠚	⠈	⠘
⠄	⠅	⠇	⠍	⠝	⠕	⠏	⠟	⠗	⠎	⠞	⠌	⠜
⠤	⠥	⠧	⠭	⠽	⠵	⠯	⠿	⠷	⠮	⠾	⠬	⠼
⠠	⠡	⠣	⠩	⠹	⠱	⠫	⠻	⠳	⠪	⠺	⠨	⠸
shift down	⠂	⠆	⠒	⠲	⠢	⠖	⠶	⠦	⠔	⠴	⠐	⠰

The Braille pattern dots-3456 ( ⠼ ) is a 6-dot braille cell with the top right, middle right, and both bottom dots raised, or an 8-dot braille cell with the top right, upper-middle right, and both lower-middle dots raised. It is represented by the Unicode code point U+283c, and in Braille ASCII with a number sign: #.

Character information
Preview	⠼ (braille pattern dots-3456)	
Unicode name	BRAILLE PATTERN DOTS-3456	
Encodings	decimal	hex
Unicode	10300	U+283C
UTF-8	226 160 188	E2 A0 BC
Numeric character reference	&#10300;	&#x283C;
Braille ASCII	35	23

== Unified Braille ==
In unified international braille, the braille pattern dots-3456 is used as a number indicator.

=== Table of unified braille values ===
French Braille	number indicator
English Braille	number indicator
English Contraction	-ble†
German Braille	number indicator, ich
Bharati Braille	ण / ਣ / ણ / ণ / ଣ / ణ / ಣ / ണ / ண
IPA Braille	/ɹ/
Russian Braille	number indicator
Persian Braille	number indicator
Luxembourgish Braille	0 (zero)

† Abolished in Unified English Braille

== Other braille ==
Japanese Braille	number indicator
Mainland Chinese Braille	eng
Two-Cell Chinese Braille	-ěi, number indicator
Nemeth Braille	number indicator
Gardner Salinas Braille	# (number sign)

== Plus dots 7 and 8 ==
Related to Braille pattern dots-3456 are Braille patterns 34567, 34568, and 345678, which are used in 8-dot braille systems, such as Gardner-Salinas and Luxembourgish Braille.

Character information
Preview	⡼ (braille pattern dots-34567)		⢼ (braille pattern dots-34568)		⣼ (braille pattern dots-345678)	
Unicode name	BRAILLE PATTERN DOTS-34567		BRAILLE PATTERN DOTS-34568		BRAILLE PATTERN DOTS-345678	
Encodings	decimal	hex	dec	hex	dec	hex
Unicode	10364	U+287C	10428	U+28BC	10492	U+28FC
UTF-8	226 161 188	E2 A1 BC	226 162 188	E2 A2 BC	226 163 188	E2 A3 BC
Numeric character reference	&#10364;	&#x287C;	&#10428;	&#x28BC;	&#10492;	&#x28FC;

	dots 34567	dots 34568	dots 345678
Gardner Salinas Braille	$ (dollar sign)	£ (pound sign)	close displayed equation

== Related 8-dot kantenji patterns ==
In the Japanese kantenji braille, the standard 8-dot Braille patterns 5678, 15678, 45678, and 145678 are the patterns related to Braille pattern dots-3456, since the two additional dots of kantenji patterns 03456, 34567, and 034567 are placed above the base 6-dot cell, instead of below, as in standard 8-dot braille.

Character information
Preview	⣰ (braille pattern dots-5678)		⣱ (braille pattern dots-15678)		⣸ (braille pattern dots-45678)		⣹ (braille pattern dots-145678)	
Unicode name	BRAILLE PATTERN DOTS-5678		BRAILLE PATTERN DOTS-15678		BRAILLE PATTERN DOTS-45678		BRAILLE PATTERN DOTS-145678	
Encodings	decimal	hex	dec	hex	dec	hex	dec	hex
Unicode	10480	U+28F0	10481	U+28F1	10488	U+28F8	10489	U+28F9
UTF-8	226 163 176	E2 A3 B0	226 163 177	E2 A3 B1	226 163 184	E2 A3 B8	226 163 185	E2 A3 B9
Numeric character reference	&#10480;	&#x28F0;	&#10481;	&#x28F1;	&#10488;	&#x28F8;	&#10489;	&#x28F9;

=== Kantenji using braille patterns 5678, 15678, 45678, or 145678 ===
This listing includes kantenji using Braille pattern dots-3456 for all 6349 kanji found in JIS C 6226-1978.

- - 火

==== Variants and thematic compounds ====
- - selector 4 + 火 = 非
- - 火 + selector 1 = 熱
- - 火 + 宿 = 蛍
- - 比 + 火 = 丈

==== Compounds of 火 ====
- - よ/广 + 火 = 灰
  - - る/忄 + よ/广 + 火 = 恢
  - - え/訁 + よ/广 + 火 = 詼
- - か/金 + 火 = 災
- - と/戸 + 火 = 炉
- - 火 + 火 = 炎
  - - に/氵 + 火 = 淡
  - - え/訁 + 火 = 談
  - - れ/口 + 火 + 火 = 啖
  - - せ/食 + 火 + 火 = 毯
  - - や/疒 + 火 + 火 = 痰
  - - そ/馬 + 火 + 火 = 犖
- - や/疒 + 火 = 炭
- - の/禾 + 火 = 秋
  - - 心 + 火 = 萩
  - - れ/口 + の/禾 + 火 = 啾
  - - る/忄 + の/禾 + 火 = 愀
  - - 心 + の/禾 + 火 = 楸
  - - に/氵 + の/禾 + 火 = 湫
  - - か/金 + の/禾 + 火 = 鍬
  - - と/戸 + の/禾 + 火 = 鞦
  - - せ/食 + の/禾 + 火 = 鰍
- - み/耳 + 火 = 耿
- - 火 + て/扌 = 灯
- - 火 + す/発 = 灸
- - 火 + ん/止 = 炊
- - 火 + そ/馬 = 炒
- - 火 + ほ/方 = 炙
- - 火 + ま/石 = 焙
- - 火 + き/木 = 焚
- - 火 + つ/土 = 焼
  - - 火 + 火 + つ/土 = 燒
- - 火 + ひ/辶 = 煉
- - 火 + に/氵 = 煙
- - 火 + る/忄 = 煤
- - 火 + ⺼ = 煥
- - 火 + お/頁 = 煩
- - 火 + と/戸 = 燈
- - 火 + ろ/十 = 燎
- - 火 + の/禾 = 燐
- - 火 + う/宀/#3 = 燥
- - 火 + さ/阝 = 燦
- - 火 + く/艹 = 燻
- - 火 + ふ/女 = 燼
- - 火 + こ/子 = 爆
- - 火 + た/⽥ = 畑
- - き/木 + 宿 + 火 = 樮
- - 火 + 比 + も/門 = 灼
- - 火 + selector 1 + す/発 = 炬
- - 火 + も/門 + selector 2 = 炮
- - 火 + 宿 + 囗 = 炯
- - 火 + 数 + へ/⺩ = 炳
- - 火 + 宿 + さ/阝 = 炸
- - 火 + す/発 + れ/口 = 烙
- - 火 + 囗 + け/犬 = 烟
- - 火 + 囗 + れ/口 = 烱
- - 火 + 宿 + ほ/方 = 烽
- - 火 + 宿 + ぬ/力 = 焔
- - 火 + 日 + 比 = 焜
- - 火 + 日 + へ/⺩ = 煌
- - 火 + 宿 + 仁/亻 = 煖
- - 火 + 龸 + ろ/十 = 煢
- - 火 + 宿 + 数 = 煬
- - 火 + と/戸 + む/車 = 煽
- - 火 + め/目 + 心 = 熄
- - 火 + う/宀/#3 + た/⽥ = 熔
- - 火 + を/貝 + こ/子 = 熕
- - 火 + と/戸 + ね/示 = 熨
- - 火 + 宿 + 日 = 熾
- - 火 + 宿 + 氷/氵 = 燉
- - 火 + の/禾 + た/⽥ = 燔
- - 火 + も/門 + 日 = 燗
- - 火 + 囗 + の/禾 = 燠
- - 火 + selector 2 + そ/馬 = 燧
- - 火 + ぬ/力 + の/禾 = 燬
- - 火 + 宿 + む/車 = 燭
- - 火 + selector 4 + ゑ/訁 = 燮
- - 火 + ひ/辶 + た/⽥ = 燵
- - 火 + 宿 + そ/馬 = 燹
- - 火 + 宿 + や/疒 = 燿
- - 火 + 日 + ゐ/幺 = 爍
- - と/戸 + と/戸 + 火 = 爐
- - 火 + も/門 + ひ/辶 = 爛
- - 火 + 囗 + り/分 = 爨
- - け/犬 + 宿 + 火 = 狄
- - 火 + う/宀/#3 + へ/⺩ = 瑩
- - 心 + 宿 + 火 = 荻
- - ひ/辶 + 宿 + 火 = 逖
- - せ/食 + 宿 + 火 = 餤
- - 火 + 宿 + せ/食 = 鶯

==== Compounds of 非 ====
- - な/亻 + 火 = 俳
- - ゆ/彳 + 火 = 徘
- - て/扌 + 火 = 排
- - ゐ/幺 + 火 = 緋
- - ゑ/訁 + 火 = 誹
- - 火 + 心 = 悲
- - 火 + 龸 = 斐
- - 火 + む/車 = 輩
- - も/門 + selector 4 + 火 = 匪
- - と/戸 + selector 4 + 火 = 扉
- - 日 + selector 4 + 火 = 暃
- - へ/⺩ + selector 4 + 火 = 琲
- - ⺼ + selector 4 + 火 = 腓
- - 心 + selector 4 + 火 = 菲
- - む/車 + selector 4 + 火 = 蜚
- - ね/示 + selector 4 + 火 = 裴
- - ち/竹 + selector 4 + 火 = 霏
- - 龸 + selector 4 + 火 = 韭
- - せ/食 + selector 4 + 火 = 鯡
- - さ/阝 + selector 4 + 火 = 齏
- - 火 + む/車 + selector 2 = 翡
- - 心 + 龸 + 火 = 薤
- - 火 + こ/子 + く/艹 = 靠
- - ま/石 + 宿 + 火 = 靡
- - 心 + う/宀/#3 + 火 = 韮
- - さ/阝 + 龸 + 火 = 韲

==== Compounds of 熱 and 灬 ====
- - き/木 + 火 + selector 1 = 杰
- - 龸 + 火 = 為
  - - 龸 + 龸 + 火 = 爲
    - - え/訁 + 龸 + 火 = 譌
  - - 仁/亻 + 火 = 偽
    - - 仁/亻 + 仁/亻 + 火 = 僞
- - ぬ/力 + 火 = 勲
  - - ぬ/力 + ぬ/力 + 火 = 勳
- - れ/口 + 火 = 点
  - - れ/口 + れ/口 + 火 = 點
- - ほ/方 + 火 = 烈
- - む/車 + 火 = 無
  - - れ/口 + む/車 + 火 = 嘸
  - - よ/广 + む/車 + 火 = 廡
  - - る/忄 + む/車 + 火 = 憮
  - - て/扌 + む/車 + 火 = 撫
  - - 心 + む/車 + 火 = 蕪
- - い/糹/#2 + 火 = 焦
  - - ま/石 + 火 = 礁
  - - る/忄 + い/糹/#2 + 火 = 憔
  - - き/木 + い/糹/#2 + 火 = 樵
  - - 心 + い/糹/#2 + 火 = 蕉
- - け/犬 + 火 = 然
  - - 火 + け/犬 = 燃
  - - て/扌 + け/犬 + 火 = 撚
- - 日 + 火 = 照
- - ら/月 + 火 = 熊
  - - す/発 + ら/月 + 火 = 羆
- - お/頁 + 火 = 熟
- - 火 + 氷/氵 = 烝
- - 火 + ら/月 = 煎
- - 火 + 日 = 煮
- - 氷/氵 + 火 = 潟
- - う/宀/#3 + 火 = 窯
- - く/艹 + 火 = 薫
- - 火 + せ/食 = 鴬
- - 火 + 龸 + ま/石 = 烹
- - 火 + selector 2 + き/木 = 煕
- - 火 + も/門 + selector 5 = 煦
- - 火 + 宿 + き/木 = 熈
- - く/艹 + 宿 + 火 = 熏
- - 火 + selector 3 + ほ/方 = 熬
- - 火 + つ/土 + 囗 = 熹
- - せ/食 + く/艹 + 火 = 醺
- - 火 + な/亻 + き/木 = 烋
- - 火 + う/宀/#3 + り/分 = 竃
- - そ/馬 + 宿 + 火 = 羮
- - そ/馬 + 龸 + 火 = 羹

==== Compounds of 蛍 ====
- - 火 + 火 + 宿 = 螢
- - 火 + 宿 + つ/土 = 塋
  - - 火 + 宿 + り/分 = 竈

==== Compounds of 丈 ====
- - き/木 + 火 = 杖
- - な/亻 + 比 + 火 = 仗

==== Other compounds ====
- - ふ/女 + 火 = 尽
  - - ふ/女 + ふ/女 + 火 = 盡
    - - 仁/亻 + ふ/女 + 火 = 儘
    - - つ/土 + ふ/女 + 火 = 壗
    - - を/貝 + ふ/女 + 火 = 贐
  - - な/亻 + ふ/女 + 火 = 侭
- - ひ/辶 + 火 = 滅
- - す/発 + 火 = 虚
  - - 火 + れ/口 = 嘘
  - - つ/土 + す/発 + 火 = 墟
  - - ん/止 + す/発 + 火 = 歔
- - 火 + ぬ/力 = 勢
- - う/宀/#3 + 宿 + 火 = 窰
