= Braille pattern dots-456 =

Braille pattern

6-dot braille cells
⠀	⠁	⠃	⠉	⠙	⠑	⠋	⠛	⠓	⠊	⠚	⠈	⠘
⠄	⠅	⠇	⠍	⠝	⠕	⠏	⠟	⠗	⠎	⠞	⠌	⠜
⠤	⠥	⠧	⠭	⠽	⠵	⠯	⠿	⠷	⠮	⠾	⠬	⠼
⠠	⠡	⠣	⠩	⠹	⠱	⠫	⠻	⠳	⠪	⠺	⠨	⠸
shift down	⠂	⠆	⠒	⠲	⠢	⠖	⠶	⠦	⠔	⠴	⠐	⠰

The Braille pattern dots-456 (⠸) is a 6-dot braille cell with all three right dots raised, or an 8-dot braille cell with the top, upper-middle, and lower-middle right dots raised. It is represented by the Unicode code point U+2838, and in Braille ASCII with the underscore: _.

Character information
Preview	⠸ (braille pattern dots-456)	
Unicode name	BRAILLE PATTERN DOTS-456	
Encodings	decimal	hex
Unicode	10296	U+2838
UTF-8	226 160 184	E2 A0 B8
Numeric character reference	&#10296;	&#x2838;
Braille ASCII	95	5F

== Unified Braille ==
In unified international braille, the braille pattern dots-456 is used to represent lateral approximant, such as /l/, /ʟ/, or /ʎ/ when multiple letters correspond to these values, and is otherwise assigned as needed.

=== Table of unified braille values ===
French Braille	emphasis mark, ll, -elle
English Braille	initial letter abbreviation mark
German Braille	-lich
Bharati Braille	ळ / ਲ਼ / ળ / ଲ / ళ / ಳ / ള / ள / ළ
IPA Braille	tone letter mark
Russian Braille	italic mark
Slovak Braille	Ľ

== Other braille ==
Japanese Braille	yōon + dakuten + handakuten
Taiwanese Braille	wang, -uang / ㄨㄤ
Nemeth Braille	punctuation sign

== Plus dots 7 and 8 ==
Related to Braille pattern dots-456 are Braille patterns 4567, 4568, and 45678, which are used in 8-dot braille systems, such as Gardner-Salinas and Luxembourgish Braille.

Character information
Preview	⡸ (braille pattern dots-4567)		⢸ (braille pattern dots-4568)		⣸ (braille pattern dots-45678)	
Unicode name	BRAILLE PATTERN DOTS-4567		BRAILLE PATTERN DOTS-4568		BRAILLE PATTERN DOTS-45678	
Encodings	decimal	hex	dec	hex	dec	hex
Unicode	10360	U+2878	10424	U+28B8	10488	U+28F8
UTF-8	226 161 184	E2 A1 B8	226 162 184	E2 A2 B8	226 163 184	E2 A3 B8
Numeric character reference	&#10360;	&#x2878;	&#10424;	&#x28B8;	&#10488;	&#x28F8;

	dots 4567	dots 4568	dots 45678
Gardner Salinas Braille		underline indicator	underline indicator

== Related 8-dot kantenji patterns ==
In the Japanese kantenji braille, the standard 8-dot Braille patterns 568, 1568, 4568, and 14568 are the patterns related to Braille pattern dots-456, since the two additional dots of kantenji patterns 0456, 4567, and 04567 are placed above the base 6-dot cell, instead of below, as in standard 8-dot braille.

Character information
Preview	⢰ (braille pattern dots-568)		⢱ (braille pattern dots-1568)		⢸ (braille pattern dots-4568)		⢹ (braille pattern dots-14568)	
Unicode name	BRAILLE PATTERN DOTS-568		BRAILLE PATTERN DOTS-1568		BRAILLE PATTERN DOTS-4568		BRAILLE PATTERN DOTS-14568	
Encodings	decimal	hex	dec	hex	dec	hex	dec	hex
Unicode	10416	U+28B0	10417	U+28B1	10424	U+28B8	10425	U+28B9
UTF-8	226 162 176	E2 A2 B0	226 162 177	E2 A2 B1	226 162 184	E2 A2 B8	226 162 185	E2 A2 B9
Numeric character reference	&#10416;	&#x28B0;	&#10417;	&#x28B1;	&#10424;	&#x28B8;	&#10425;	&#x28B9;

=== Kantenji using braille patterns 568, 1568, 4568, or 14568 ===
This listing includes kantenji using Braille pattern dots-456 for all 6349 kanji found in JIS C 6226-1978.

- - 氷

==== Variants and thematic compounds ====
- - selector 4 + 氷/氵 = 改
  - - selector 4 + selector 4 + 氷/氵 = 攵
- - selector 6 + 氷/氵 = 曷
- - 氷/氵 + selector 1 = 冷
- - 氷/氵 + selector 2 = 汰
- - 氷/氵 + selector 3 = 冫
- - 氷/氵 + selector 4 = 永

==== Compounds of 氷 and 氵 ====
- - ま/石 + 氷/氵 = 承
- - ふ/女 + 氷/氵 = 汝
- - た/⽥ + 氷/氵 = 油
- - 日 + 氷/氵 = 泉
  - - い/糹/#2 + 氷/氵 = 線
  - - き/木 + 日 + 氷/氵 = 楾
  - - に/氵 + 日 + 氷/氵 = 湶
  - - ⺼ + 日 + 氷/氵 = 腺
- - せ/食 + 氷/氵 = 漁
- - に/氵 + 氷/氵 = 激
- - 火 + 氷/氵 = 烝
- - そ/馬 + 氷/氵 = 牧
- - め/目 + 氷/氵 = 瞥
- - ⺼ + 氷/氵 = 膝
- - く/艹 + 氷/氵 = 藩
- - 氷/氵 + き/木 = 染
- - 氷/氵 + か/金 = 汗
- - 氷/氵 + も/門 = 汚
- - 氷/氵 + こ/子 = 江
- - 氷/氵 + 龸 = 沈
- - 氷/氵 + ほ/方 = 沙
  - - ふ/女 + 氷/氵 + ほ/方 = 娑
  - - 心 + 氷/氵 + ほ/方 = 莎
  - - ね/示 + 氷/氵 + ほ/方 = 裟
  - - せ/食 + 氷/氵 + ほ/方 = 鯊
- - 氷/氵 + め/目 = 沸
- - 氷/氵 + な/亻 = 治
- - 氷/氵 + 宿 = 況
  - - 氷/氵 + 氷/氵 + 宿 = 况
- - 氷/氵 + 日 = 泊
  - - ち/竹 + 氷/氵 + 日 = 箔
- - 氷/氵 + 心 = 泌
- - 氷/氵 + ふ/女 = 津
- - 氷/氵 + み/耳 = 派
- - 氷/氵 + そ/馬 = 浄
  - - 氷/氵 + 氷/氵 + そ/馬 = 淨
- - 氷/氵 + う/宀/#3 = 浮
- - 氷/氵 + た/⽥ = 浴
- - 氷/氵 + ゑ/訁 = 浸
- - 氷/氵 + つ/土 = 涯
- - 氷/氵 + れ/口 = 涼
  - - 氷/氵 + 氷/氵 + れ/口 = 凉
- - 氷/氵 + に/氵 = 淫
  - - ち/竹 + 氷/氵 + に/氵 = 霪
- - 氷/氵 + 囗 = 淳
- - 氷/氵 + る/忄 = 添
- - 氷/氵 + せ/食 = 清
- - 氷/氵 + さ/阝 = 済
  - - 氷/氵 + 氷/氵 + さ/阝 = 濟
- - 氷/氵 + ぬ/力 = 測
- - 氷/氵 + よ/广 = 源
- - 氷/氵 + ろ/十 = 準
  - - 氷/氵 + 氷/氵 + ろ/十 = 凖
- - 氷/氵 + り/分 = 溢
- - 氷/氵 + ら/月 = 滑
- - 氷/氵 + ち/竹 = 漏
- - 氷/氵 + え/訁 = 演
- - 氷/氵 + く/艹 = 漢
- - 氷/氵 + ま/石 = 漫
- - 氷/氵 + お/頁 = 漬
- - 氷/氵 + ゐ/幺 = 潔
- - 氷/氵 + け/犬 = 潜
  - - 氷/氵 + 氷/氵 + け/犬 = 潛
  - - selector 1 + 氷/氵 + け/犬 = 濳
- - 氷/氵 + 火 = 潟
- - 氷/氵 + へ/⺩ = 潤
- - 氷/氵 + む/車 = 濁
- - 氷/氵 + の/禾 = 濡
- - 氷/氵 + ⺼ = 濫
- - 氷/氵 + 数 = 瀬
- - 氷/氵 + 宿 + つ/土 = 汢
- - 氷/氵 + 宿 + 日 = 汨
- - 氷/氵 + 宿 + ろ/十 = 浤
- - 氷/氵 + 宿 + か/金 = 淦
- - 氷/氵 + 龸 + selector 2 = 滉
- - 氷/氵 + 宿 + ぬ/力 = 滔
- - 氷/氵 + 宿 + 仁/亻 = 漑
- - 氷/氵 + 龸 + そ/馬 = 漾
- - 氷/氵 + 宿 + け/犬 = 潅
- - に/氵 + ら/月 + 氷/氵 = 潸
- - 氷/氵 + ら/月 + た/⽥ = 澑
- - 氷/氵 + 宿 + く/艹 = 濛
- - 氷/氵 + へ/⺩ + し/巿 = 濤
- - 氷/氵 + と/戸 + 日 = 瀦
- - 氷/氵 + 囗 + め/目 = 瀰
- - 氷/氵 + 龸 + け/犬 = 灌

==== Compounds of 改 and 攵 ====
- - み/耳 + 氷/氵 = 敢
  - - よ/广 + 氷/氵 = 厳
    - - な/亻 + よ/广 + 氷/氵 = 儼
  - - や/疒 + 氷/氵 = 巌
    - - や/疒 + や/疒 + 氷/氵 = 巖
  - - 心 + み/耳 + 氷/氵 = 橄
  - - め/目 + み/耳 + 氷/氵 = 瞰
- - ゆ/彳 + 氷/氵 = 微
  - - 心 + ゆ/彳 + 氷/氵 = 薇
- - 仁/亻 + 氷/氵 = 攸
- - こ/子 + 氷/氵 = 攻
- - ほ/方 + 氷/氵 = 放
- - ん/止 + 氷/氵 = 政
- - れ/口 + 氷/氵 = 故
  - - な/亻 + れ/口 + 氷/氵 = 做
- - 龸 + 氷/氵 = 敏
- - ろ/十 + 氷/氵 = 救
- - を/貝 + 氷/氵 = 敗
- - と/戸 + 氷/氵 = 教
- - ら/月 + 氷/氵 = 散
  - - て/扌 + ら/月 + 氷/氵 = 撒
  - - い/糹/#2 + ら/月 + 氷/氵 = 繖
- - も/門 + 氷/氵 = 敬
  - - き/木 + も/門 + 氷/氵 = 檠
- - お/頁 + 氷/氵 = 敵
- - む/車 + 氷/氵 = 敷
- - り/分 + 氷/氵 = 斂
  - - に/氵 + り/分 + 氷/氵 = 瀲
- - き/木 + 氷/氵 = 枚
- - か/金 + 氷/氵 = 赦
  - - む/車 + か/金 + 氷/氵 = 螫
- - ひ/辶 + 氷/氵 = 邀
- - ち/竹 + 氷/氵 = 霰
- - 氷/氵 + し/巿 = 幣
  - - 氷/氵 + 氷/氵 + し/巿 = 幤
- - 氷/氵 + と/戸 = 弊
- - 氷/氵 + ゆ/彳 = 致
  - - い/糹/#2 + 氷/氵 + ゆ/彳 = 緻
- - 氷/氵 + す/発 = 覆
- - 仁/亻 + 宿 + 氷/氵 = 傚
- - よ/广 + 宿 + 氷/氵 = 厰
- - こ/子 + 龸 + 氷/氵 = 孜
- - ゆ/彳 + 宿 + 氷/氵 = 徼
- - も/門 + 宿 + 氷/氵 = 攷
- - 氷/氵 + selector 3 + は/辶 = 敝
- - 氷/氵 + selector 6 + は/辶 = 敞
- - こ/子 + 宿 + 氷/氵 = 敦
- - 氷/氵 + ほ/方 + selector 2 = 斃
- - 日 + 宿 + 氷/氵 = 暾
- - き/木 + 宿 + 氷/氵 = 檄
- - 火 + 宿 + 氷/氵 = 燉
- - た/⽥ + 宿 + 氷/氵 = 畋
- - 氷/氵 + う/宀/#3 + り/分 = 竅
- - く/艹 + 宿 + 氷/氵 = 蔽
- - に/氵 + 宿 + 氷/氵 = 覈
- - か/金 + 宿 + 氷/氵 = 鐓
- - 氷/氵 + 比 + め/目 = 鼈

==== Compounds of 曷 ====
- - て/扌 + 氷/氵 = 掲
- - 氷/氵 + 氷/氵 = 渇
- - ね/示 + 氷/氵 = 褐
- - え/訁 + 氷/氵 = 謁
  - - く/艹 + え/訁 + 氷/氵 = 藹
- - な/亻 + 宿 + 氷/氵 = 偈
- - れ/口 + 宿 + 氷/氵 = 喝
- - 氷/氵 + ん/止 + selector 1 = 歇
- - ま/石 + 宿 + 氷/氵 = 碣
- - ま/石 + 龸 + 氷/氵 = 竭
- - そ/馬 + 宿 + 氷/氵 = 羯
- - 心 + 宿 + 氷/氵 = 葛
- - む/車 + 宿 + 氷/氵 = 蝎
- - ひ/辶 + 宿 + 氷/氵 = 遏
- - ち/竹 + 宿 + 氷/氵 = 靄
- - と/戸 + 宿 + 氷/氵 = 鞨

==== Compounds of 冫 ====
- - さ/阝 + 氷/氵 = 凄
- - う/宀/#3 + 氷/氵 = 寒
- - 氷/氵 + 仁/亻 = 冶
- - 氷/氵 + い/糹/#2 = 准
  - - も/門 + 氷/氵 + い/糹/#2 = 匯
- - 氷/氵 + や/疒 = 凝
- - 氷/氵 + ん/止 = 次
  - - 氷/氵 + を/貝 = 資
  - - れ/口 + 氷/氵 + ん/止 = 咨
  - - る/忄 + 氷/氵 + ん/止 = 恣
  - - か/金 + 氷/氵 + ん/止 = 瓷
  - - の/禾 + 氷/氵 + ん/止 = 粢
- - 氷/氵 + ひ/辶 = 凍
- - 氷/氵 + 宿 + に/氵 = 冰
- - 氷/氵 + 比 + ⺼ = 冱
- - 氷/氵 + 宿 + め/目 = 冴
- - 氷/氵 + ほ/方 + ぬ/力 = 冽
- - 氷/氵 + 囗 + ろ/十 = 凅
- - 氷/氵 + 囗 + つ/土 = 凋
- - 氷/氵 + 宿 + す/発 = 凌
- - 氷/氵 + 宿 + れ/口 = 凛
- - 氷/氵 + う/宀/#3 + そ/馬 = 馮

==== Compounds of 永 ====
- - れ/口 + 氷/氵 + selector 4 = 咏
- - る/忄 + 氷/氵 + selector 4 = 怺
- - 日 + 氷/氵 + selector 4 = 昶
- - ⺼ + 氷/氵 + selector 4 = 脉

==== Other compounds ====
- - 心 + 氷/氵 = 茜
- - ふ/女 + 氷/氵 + う/宀/#3 = 艀
- - む/車 + 氷/氵 + う/宀/#3 = 蜉
- - さ/阝 + 氷/氵 + う/宀/#3 = 郛
- - せ/食 + 氷/氵 + 龸 = 酖
- - 氷/氵 + 日 + ろ/十 = 覃
- - 氷/氵 + 宿 + せ/食 = 鴆
