= Braille pattern dots-13 =

Braille pattern

6-dot braille cells
⠀	⠁	⠃	⠉	⠙	⠑	⠋	⠛	⠓	⠊	⠚	⠈	⠘
⠄	⠅	⠇	⠍	⠝	⠕	⠏	⠟	⠗	⠎	⠞	⠌	⠜
⠤	⠥	⠧	⠭	⠽	⠵	⠯	⠿	⠷	⠮	⠾	⠬	⠼
⠠	⠡	⠣	⠩	⠹	⠱	⠫	⠻	⠳	⠪	⠺	⠨	⠸
shift down	⠂	⠆	⠒	⠲	⠢	⠖	⠶	⠦	⠔	⠴	⠐	⠰

The Braille pattern dots-13 ( ⠅ ) is a 6-dot braille cell with the top and bottom left dots raised, or an 8-dot braille cell with the top and middle-bottom left dots raised. It is represented by the Unicode code point U+2805, and in Braille ASCII with "K".

Character information
Preview	⠅ (braille pattern dots-13)	
Unicode name	BRAILLE PATTERN DOTS-13	
Encodings	decimal	hex
Unicode	10245	U+2805
UTF-8	226 160 133	E2 A0 85
Numeric character reference	&#10245;	&#x2805;
Braille ASCII	75	4B

== Unified Braille ==
In unified international braille, the braille pattern dots-13 is used to represent an unvoiced velar plosive, ie /k/.

=== Table of unified braille values ===
French Braille	K, au
English Braille	K
English Contraction	knowledge
German Braille	K
Bharati Braille	क / ਕ / ક / ক / କ / క / ಕ / ക / க / ක / ک
Icelandic Braille	K
IPA Braille	/k/
Russian Braille	К
Slovak Braille	K
Arabic Braille	ك
Persian Braille	ک
Irish Braille	K
Thai Braille	ข kh
Luxembourgish Braille	k (minuscule)

== Other braille ==
Japanese Braille	na / な / ナ
Korean Braille	-j / ㅈ
Mainland Chinese Braille	k/q
Taiwanese Braille	g, j / ㄍ,ㄐ
Two-Cell Chinese Braille	k- -ēn
Nemeth Braille	not an independent sign
Algerian Braille	ز

== Plus dots 7 and 8 ==
Related to Braille pattern dots-13 are Braille patterns 137, 138, and 1378, which are used in 8-dot braille systems, such as Gardner-Salinas and Luxembourgish Braille.

Character information
Preview	⡅ (braille pattern dots-137)		⢅ (braille pattern dots-138)		⣅ (braille pattern dots-1378)	
Unicode name	BRAILLE PATTERN DOTS-137		BRAILLE PATTERN DOTS-138		BRAILLE PATTERN DOTS-1378	
Encodings	decimal	hex	dec	hex	dec	hex
Unicode	10309	U+2845	10373	U+2885	10437	U+28C5
UTF-8	226 161 133	E2 A1 85	226 162 133	E2 A2 85	226 163 133	E2 A3 85
Numeric character reference	&#10309;	&#x2845;	&#10373;	&#x2885;	&#10437;	&#x28C5;

	dots 137	dots 138	dots 1378
Gardner Salinas Braille	K (capital)	κ (kappa)	
Luxembourgish Braille	K (capital)		

== Related 8-dot kantenji patterns ==
In the Japanese kantenji braille, the standard 8-dot Braille patterns 27, 127, 247, and 1247 are the patterns related to Braille pattern dots-13, since the two additional dots of kantenji patterns 013, 137, and 0137 are placed above the base 6-dot cell, instead of below, as in standard 8-dot braille.

Character information
Preview	⡂ (braille pattern dots-27)		⡃ (braille pattern dots-127)		⡊ (braille pattern dots-247)		⡋ (braille pattern dots-1247)	
Unicode name	BRAILLE PATTERN DOTS-27		BRAILLE PATTERN DOTS-127		BRAILLE PATTERN DOTS-247		BRAILLE PATTERN DOTS-1247	
Encodings	decimal	hex	dec	hex	dec	hex	dec	hex
Unicode	10306	U+2842	10307	U+2843	10314	U+284A	10315	U+284B
UTF-8	226 161 130	E2 A1 82	226 161 131	E2 A1 83	226 161 138	E2 A1 8A	226 161 139	E2 A1 8B
Numeric character reference	&#10306;	&#x2842;	&#10307;	&#x2843;	&#10314;	&#x284A;	&#10315;	&#x284B;

=== Kantenji using braille patterns 27, 127, 247, or 1247 ===
This listing includes kantenji using Braille pattern dots-13 for all 6349 kanji found in JIS C 6226-1978.

- - 人

==== Variants and thematic compounds ====
- - selector 1 + な/亻 = 意
- - selector 4 + な/亻 = 台
  - - selector 4 + selector 4 + な/亻 = 臺
- - selector 5 + な/亻 = 夾
- - selector 6 + な/亻 = 竟
- - な/亻 + selector 6 = 体

==== Compounds of 人 ====
- - い/糹/#2 + な/亻 = 伊
- - た/⽥ + な/亻 = 佃
- - し/巿 + な/亻 = 侍
- - ね/示 + な/亻 = 依
- - な/亻 + な/亻 = 僕
  - - に/氵 + な/亻 + な/亻 = 濮
- - そ/馬 + な/亻 = 儀
- - 比 + な/亻 = 入
  - - ひ/辶 + な/亻 = 込
  - - れ/口 + 比 + な/亻 = 叺
  - - つ/土 + 比 + な/亻 = 圦
  - - き/木 + 比 + な/亻 = 杁
  - - な/亻 + 龸 + せ/食 = 鳰
- - れ/口 + な/亻 = 史
  - - そ/馬 + れ/口 + な/亻 = 駛
- - 囗 + な/亻 = 囚
  - - に/氵 + 囗 + な/亻 = 泅
- - 龸 + な/亻 = 夜
  - - に/氵 + な/亻 = 液
  - - て/扌 + 龸 + な/亻 = 掖
  - - ⺼ + 龸 + な/亻 = 腋
- - ゆ/彳 + な/亻 = 夷
  - - ふ/女 + ゆ/彳 + な/亻 = 姨
  - - に/氵 + ゆ/彳 + な/亻 = 洟
  - - や/疒 + ゆ/彳 + な/亻 = 痍
  - - か/金 + ゆ/彳 + な/亻 = 銕
- - す/発 + な/亻 = 臥
- - な/亻 + 仁/亻 = 伺
  - - く/艹 + な/亻 = 荷
- - 宿 + な/亻 = 褒
  - - 龸 + な/亻 + れ/口 = 襃
- - も/門 + な/亻 = 閃
- - な/亻 + つ/土 = 仕
  - - な/亻 + つ/土 + れ/口 = 佶
    - - な/亻 + つ/土 + 囗 = 僖
- - な/亻 + ち/竹 = 他
- - な/亻 + し/巿 = 付
  - - ち/竹 + な/亻 = 符
  - - な/亻 + よ/广 = 俯
  - - れ/口 + な/亻 + し/巿 = 咐
  - - つ/土 + な/亻 + し/巿 = 坿
  - - て/扌 + な/亻 + し/巿 = 拊
  - - き/木 + な/亻 + し/巿 = 柎
  - - く/艹 + な/亻 + し/巿 = 苻
  - - せ/食 + な/亻 + し/巿 = 鮒
- - な/亻 + ん/止 = 仮
- - な/亻 + さ/阝 = 仰
- - な/亻 + 宿 = 仲
- - な/亻 + そ/馬 = 件
  - - な/亻 + そ/馬 + selector 2 = 佯
- - な/亻 + け/犬 = 伏
  - - 心 + な/亻 + け/犬 = 茯
  - - ね/示 + な/亻 + け/犬 = 袱
- - な/亻 + き/木 = 休
  - - る/忄 + な/亻 + き/木 = 恷
  - - 火 + な/亻 + き/木 = 烋
  - - そ/馬 + な/亻 + き/木 = 貅
  - - せ/食 + な/亻 + き/木 = 鮴
- - な/亻 + て/扌 = 伝
- - な/亻 + も/門 = 似
- - な/亻 + 日 = 但
- - な/亻 + ま/石 = 位
  - - く/艹 + な/亻 + ま/石 = 莅
  - - な/亻 + ま/石 + り/分 = 僮
- - な/亻 + へ/⺩ = 住
- - な/亻 + か/金 = 何
- - な/亻 + と/戸 = 併
- - な/亻 + ぬ/力 = 例
- - な/亻 + こ/子 = 供
- - な/亻 + に/氵 = 価
  - - な/亻 + な/亻 + に/氵 = 價
- - な/亻 + は/辶 = 侮
- - な/亻 + ゐ/幺 = 係
- - な/亻 + み/耳 = 促
- - な/亻 + む/車 = 俊
- - な/亻 + た/⽥ = 俗
- - な/亻 + れ/口 = 保
  - - つ/土 + な/亻 + れ/口 = 堡
  - - く/艹 + な/亻 + れ/口 = 葆
  - - ね/示 + な/亻 + れ/口 = 褓
- - な/亻 + え/訁 = 信
- - な/亻 + う/宀/#3 = 修
  - - く/艹 + な/亻 + う/宀/#3 = 蓚
- - な/亻 + 火 = 俳
- - な/亻 + 囗 = 個
- - な/亻 + ゆ/彳 = 倒
- - な/亻 + や/疒 = 候
- - な/亻 + ね/示 = 借
- - な/亻 + め/目 = 値
- - な/亻 + る/忄 = 倫
- - な/亻 + い/糹/#2 = 偉
- - な/亻 + ふ/女 = 健
- - な/亻 + く/艹 = 偶
- - な/亻 + ほ/方 = 傍
- - な/亻 + ひ/辶 = 備
  - - る/忄 + な/亻 + ひ/辶 = 憊
- - な/亻 + を/貝 = 債
- - な/亻 + お/頁 = 傾
- - な/亻 + り/分 = 働
- - な/亻 + な/亻 = 僕
- - な/亻 + ろ/十 = 僚
- - な/亻 + の/禾 = 儒
- - な/亻 + な/亻 + ん/止 = 假
- - な/亻 + な/亻 + て/扌 = 傳
- - な/亻 + 宿 + ろ/十 = 什
- - な/亻 + 宿 + ぬ/力 = 仂
- - な/亻 + 宿 + と/戸 = 仆
- - な/亻 + selector 1 + ゐ/幺 = 仍
- - な/亻 + 宿 + 仁/亻 = 从
- - な/亻 + 比 + 火 = 仗
- - な/亻 + selector 1 + ぬ/力 = 仞
- - な/亻 + 数 + せ/食 = 仟
- - な/亻 + 仁/亻 + 宿 = 价
- - な/亻 + 宿 + 宿 = 伉
- - な/亻 + 数 + ら/月 = 伍
- - な/亻 + 宿 + は/辶 = 伎
- - な/亻 + れ/口 + ろ/十 = 估
- - な/亻 + 仁/亻 + ろ/十 = 伶
- - な/亻 + 比 + 数 = 佑
- - な/亻 + selector 6 + け/犬 = 佚
- - な/亻 + も/門 + selector 5 = 佝
- - な/亻 + む/車 + し/巿 = 佩
- - な/亻 + 数 + め/目 = 佰
- - な/亻 + 数 + 宿 = 佻
- - な/亻 + 龸 + ち/竹 = 佼
- - な/亻 + れ/口 + う/宀/#3 = 侃
- - な/亻 + ほ/方 + ほ/方 = 侈
- - な/亻 + selector 5 + か/金 = 侏
- - な/亻 + ろ/十 + ら/月 = 侑
- - な/亻 + 宿 + な/亻 = 侠
- - な/亻 + 宿 + な/亻 = 侠
- - な/亻 + ふ/女 + 火 = 侭
- - な/亻 + 囗 + selector 1 = 俄
- - な/亻 + selector 5 + そ/馬 = 俎
- - な/亻 + の/禾 + ぬ/力 = 俐
- - な/亻 + め/目 + 宿 = 俔
- - な/亻 + 宿 + う/宀/#3 = 俘
- - な/亻 + 比 + り/分 = 俚
- - な/亻 + ぬ/力 + 宿 = 俛
- - な/亻 + selector 6 + む/車 = 俟
- - な/亻 + selector 1 + け/犬 = 俣
- - な/亻 + ゆ/彳 + 宿 = 俤
- - な/亻 + 宿 + む/車 = 俥
- - な/亻 + う/宀/#3 + ゑ/訁 = 俶
- - な/亻 + け/犬 + ほ/方 = 俸
- - な/亻 + た/⽥ + さ/阝 = 俾
- - な/亻 + ち/竹 + selector 4 = 倆
- - な/亻 + 龸 + け/犬 = 倏
- - な/亻 + 宿 + も/門 = 們
- - な/亻 + と/戸 + へ/⺩ = 倔
- - な/亻 + つ/土 + か/金 = 倖
- - な/亻 + け/犬 + か/金 = 倚
- - な/亻 + り/分 + 日 = 倡
- - な/亻 + う/宀/#3 + き/木 = 倥
- - な/亻 + け/犬 + さ/阝 = 倦
- - な/亻 + と/戸 + selector 1 = 倨
- - な/亻 + し/巿 + せ/食 = 倩
- - な/亻 + こ/子 + 宿 = 倪
- - な/亻 + 日 + と/戸 = 倬
- - な/亻 + の/禾 + ふ/女 = 倭
- - な/亻 + を/貝 + selector 5 = 倶
- - な/亻 + 龸 + も/門 = 偃
- - な/亻 + 宿 + 氷/氵 = 偈
- - な/亻 + よ/广 + う/宀/#3 = 偐
- - な/亻 + 比 + 日 = 偕
- - な/亻 + と/戸 + 日 = 偖
- - な/亻 + れ/口 + 氷/氵 = 做
- - な/亻 + 宿 + こ/子 = 偬
- - な/亻 + 宿 + ゆ/彳 = 偸
- - な/亻 + お/頁 + に/氵 = 傀
- - な/亻 + 宿 + て/扌 = 傅
- - な/亻 + よ/广 + 囗 = 傭
- - な/亻 + 宿 + ほ/方 = 傲
- - な/亻 + 宿 + る/忄 = 僂
- - な/亻 + 日 + け/犬 = 僣
- - な/亻 + 宿 + つ/土 = 僥
- - な/亻 + 宿 + た/⽥ = 僵
- - な/亻 + 宿 + ま/石 = 僻
- - な/亻 + 宿 + い/糹/#2 = 儁
- - な/亻 + た/⽥ + ろ/十 = 儂
- - な/亻 + へ/⺩ + し/巿 = 儔
- - な/亻 + さ/阝 + 龸 = 儕
- - な/亻 + す/発 + ⺼ = 儖
- - な/亻 + 龸 + ほ/方 = 儚
- - な/亻 + た/⽥ + た/⽥ = 儡
- - な/亻 + 囗 + 比 = 儷
- - な/亻 + く/艹 + い/糹/#2 = 儺
- - な/亻 + 龸 + 宿 = 儻
- - な/亻 + よ/广 + 氷/氵 = 儼

==== Compounds of 意 ====
- - 数 + な/亻 = 億
- - れ/口 + selector 1 + な/亻 = 噫
- - 心 + selector 1 + な/亻 = 檍

==== Compounds of 台 and 臺 ====
- - ふ/女 + な/亻 = 始
- - ほ/方 + な/亻 = 殆
- - 氷/氵 + な/亻 = 治
- - ⺼ + な/亻 = 胎
- - 心 + な/亻 = 苔
- - む/車 + な/亻 = 颱
- - せ/食 + な/亻 = 飴
- - な/亻 + 心 = 怠
- - る/忄 + selector 4 + な/亻 = 怡
- - ち/竹 + selector 4 + な/亻 = 笞
- - い/糹/#2 + selector 4 + な/亻 = 紿
- - え/訁 + selector 4 + な/亻 = 詒
- - を/貝 + selector 4 + な/亻 = 貽
- - そ/馬 + selector 4 + な/亻 = 駘
- - て/扌 + う/宀/#3 + な/亻 = 抬
- - く/艹 + selector 4 + な/亻 = 薹
  - - て/扌 + selector 4 + な/亻 = 擡

==== Compounds of 夾 ====
- - け/犬 + な/亻 = 狭
  - - け/犬 + け/犬 + な/亻 = 狹
- - や/疒 + な/亻 = 峡
  - - や/疒 + や/疒 + な/亻 = 峽
- - お/頁 + な/亻 = 頬
- - て/扌 + selector 5 + な/亻 = 挾
- - ち/竹 + selector 5 + な/亻 = 筴
- - に/氵 + 宿 + な/亻 = 浹
- - な/亻 + 宿 + め/目 = 爽
- - ち/竹 + 宿 + な/亻 = 篋
- - く/艹 + 宿 + な/亻 = 莢
- - て/扌 + 宿 + な/亻 = 挟
- - さ/阝 + 宿 + な/亻 = 陜
- - さ/阝 + 龸 + な/亻 = 陝
- - か/金 + 宿 + な/亻 = 鋏

==== Compounds of 竟 ====
- - つ/土 + な/亻 = 境
- - る/忄 + な/亻 = 憶
- - ら/月 + な/亻 = 臆
- - か/金 + な/亻 = 鏡

==== Other compounds ====
- - う/宀/#3 + な/亻 = 宅
  - - 龸 + う/宀/#3 + な/亻 = 亳
  - - な/亻 + う/宀/#3 + な/亻 = 侘
  - - れ/口 + う/宀/#3 + な/亻 = 咤
- - え/訁 + な/亻 = 託
- - ゑ/訁 + な/亻 = 詫
- - き/木 + な/亻 = 来
  - - き/木 + き/木 + な/亻 = 來
  - - ゆ/彳 + き/木 + な/亻 = 徠
  - - る/忄 + き/木 + な/亻 = 憖
  - - 心 + き/木 + な/亻 = 莱
  - - を/貝 + き/木 + な/亻 = 賚
- - り/分 + な/亻 = 傘
  - - な/亻 + お/頁 + ろ/十 = 倅
- - よ/广 + な/亻 = 座
  - - く/艹 + よ/广 + な/亻 = 蓙
- - な/亻 + 囗 + れ/口 = 嗇
- - 日 + な/亻 = 更
  - - ま/石 + な/亻 = 硬
  - - 仁/亻 + な/亻 = 便
    - - と/戸 + 仁/亻 + な/亻 = 鞭
  - - れ/口 + 日 + な/亻 = 哽
  - - や/疒 + 日 + な/亻 = 峺
  - - 心 + 日 + な/亻 = 梗
  - - の/禾 + 日 + な/亻 = 粳
  - - な/亻 + せ/食 + い/糹/#2 = 甦
- - て/扌 + な/亻 = 撲
- - き/木 + 宿 + な/亻 = 樸
- - へ/⺩ + 宿 + な/亻 = 璞
- - み/耳 + 宿 + な/亻 = 蹼
- - な/亻 + な/亻 + selector 6 = 體
- - 心 + 宿 + な/亻 = 梛
- - の/禾 + 比 + な/亻 = 糴
- - え/訁 + き/木 + な/亻 = 誄
- - な/亻 + 宿 + さ/阝 = 那
- - な/亻 + 宿 + せ/食 = 雁
