= Braille pattern dots-1246 =

Braille pattern

6-dot braille cells
⠀	⠁	⠃	⠉	⠙	⠑	⠋	⠛	⠓	⠊	⠚	⠈	⠘
⠄	⠅	⠇	⠍	⠝	⠕	⠏	⠟	⠗	⠎	⠞	⠌	⠜
⠤	⠥	⠧	⠭	⠽	⠵	⠯	⠿	⠷	⠮	⠾	⠬	⠼
⠠	⠡	⠣	⠩	⠹	⠱	⠫	⠻	⠳	⠪	⠺	⠨	⠸
shift down	⠂	⠆	⠒	⠲	⠢	⠖	⠶	⠦	⠔	⠴	⠐	⠰

The Braille pattern dots-1246 ( ⠫ ) is a 6-dot braille cell with both top, the middle left, and bottom right dots raised, or an 8-dot braille cell with both top, the upper-middle left, and lower-middle right dots raised. It is represented by the Unicode code point U+282b, and in Braille ASCII with the dollar sign: $.

Character information
Preview	⠫ (braille pattern dots-1246)	
Unicode name	BRAILLE PATTERN DOTS-1246	
Encodings	decimal	hex
Unicode	10283	U+282B
UTF-8	226 160 171	E2 A0 AB
Numeric character reference	&#10283;	&#x282B;
Braille ASCII	36	24

== Unified Braille ==
In unified international braille, the braille pattern dots-1246 is used to represent a voiced dental or alveolar plosive, such as /d/ or /d̪/ when multiple letters correspond to these values, and is otherwise assigned as needed.

=== Table of unified braille values ===
French Braille	Ë, mathematical 6, pl, "plus"
English Braille	ed
German Braille	ein
Bharati Braille	ड / ਡ / ડ / ড / ଡ / డ / ಡ / ഡ / ඩ / ڈ
Icelandic Braille	Þ
IPA Braille	/ŋ/
Russian Braille	Я
Slovak Braille	Ň
Arabic Braille	ض
Persian Braille	ض
Irish Braille	ed
Thai Braille	ฟ f
Luxembourgish Braille	6 (six)

== Other braille ==
Japanese Braille	ke / け / ケ
Korean Braille	ga / 가
Mainland Chinese Braille	ya, -ia
Taiwanese Braille	wei, -ui / ㄨㄟ
Two-Cell Chinese Braille	shu- -án
Nemeth Braille	geometric symbol prefix
Gardner Salinas Braille	6
Algerian Braille	ـِ (kasrah)

== Plus dots 7 and 8 ==
Related to Braille pattern dots-1246 are Braille patterns 12467, 12468, and 124678, which are used in 8-dot braille systems, such as Gardner-Salinas and Luxembourgish Braille.

Character information
Preview	⡫ (braille pattern dots-12467)		⢫ (braille pattern dots-12468)		⣫ (braille pattern dots-124678)	
Unicode name	BRAILLE PATTERN DOTS-12467		BRAILLE PATTERN DOTS-12468		BRAILLE PATTERN DOTS-124678	
Encodings	decimal	hex	dec	hex	dec	hex
Unicode	10347	U+286B	10411	U+28AB	10475	U+28EB
UTF-8	226 161 171	E2 A1 AB	226 162 171	E2 A2 AB	226 163 171	E2 A3 AB
Numeric character reference	&#10347;	&#x286B;	&#10411;	&#x28AB;	&#10475;	&#x28EB;

	dots 12467	dots 12468	dots 124678
Gardner Salinas Braille			
Luxembourgish Braille		ë (minuscule)	Ë (capital)

== Related 8-dot kantenji patterns ==
In the Japanese kantenji braille, the standard 8-dot Braille patterns 2358, 12358, 23458, and 123458 are the patterns related to Braille pattern dots-1246, since the two additional dots of kantenji patterns 01246, 12467, and 012467 are placed above the base 6-dot cell, instead of below, as in standard 8-dot braille.

Character information
Preview	⢖ (braille pattern dots-2358)		⢗ (braille pattern dots-12358)		⢞ (braille pattern dots-23458)		⢟ (braille pattern dots-123458)	
Unicode name	BRAILLE PATTERN DOTS-2358		BRAILLE PATTERN DOTS-12358		BRAILLE PATTERN DOTS-23458		BRAILLE PATTERN DOTS-123458	
Encodings	decimal	hex	dec	hex	dec	hex	dec	hex
Unicode	10390	U+2896	10391	U+2897	10398	U+289E	10399	U+289F
UTF-8	226 162 150	E2 A2 96	226 162 151	E2 A2 97	226 162 158	E2 A2 9E	226 162 159	E2 A2 9F
Numeric character reference	&#10390;	&#x2896;	&#10391;	&#x2897;	&#10398;	&#x289E;	&#10399;	&#x289F;

=== Kantenji using braille patterns 2358, 12358, 23458, or 123458 ===
This listing includes kantenji using Braille pattern dots-1246 for all 6349 kanji found in JIS C 6226-1978.

- - 犬

==== Variants and thematic compounds ====
- - selector 1 + け/犬 = 天
- - selector 2 + け/犬 = 太
- - selector 3 + け/犬 = 夫
- - selector 4 + け/犬 = 夭
- - selector 5 + け/犬 = 咢
- - selector 6 + け/犬 = 失
  - - selector 6 + selector 6 + け/犬 = 夸
- - け/犬 + selector 4 = 鼬
- - け/犬 + selector 5 = 鼡
- - け/犬 + selector 6 = 猫
- - 比 + け/犬 = 大
- - そ/馬 + け/犬 = 美

==== Compounds of 犬 ====
- - な/亻 + け/犬 = 伏
  - - 心 + な/亻 + け/犬 = 茯
  - - ね/示 + な/亻 + け/犬 = 袱
- - け/犬 + 火 = 然
  - - 火 + け/犬 = 燃
  - - て/扌 + け/犬 + 火 = 撚
- - へ/⺩ + け/犬 = 状
- - み/耳 + け/犬 = 献
  - - み/耳 + み/耳 + け/犬 = 獻
- - う/宀/#3 + け/犬 = 突
- - め/目 + け/犬 = 臭
  - - も/門 + め/目 + け/犬 = 闃
- - し/巿 + け/犬 = 黙
  - - し/巿 + し/巿 + け/犬 = 默
- - け/犬 + れ/口 = 器
  - - け/犬 + け/犬 + れ/口 = 噐
- - け/犬 + 龸 = 獣
  - - け/犬 + け/犬 + 龸 = 獸
- - な/亻 + 龸 + け/犬 = 倏
- - け/犬 + 宿 + れ/口 = 吠
- - れ/口 + 宿 + け/犬 = 哭
- - れ/口 + と/戸 + け/犬 = 唳
- - て/扌 + と/戸 + け/犬 = 捩
- - せ/食 + 宿 + け/犬 = 猷
- - い/糹/#2 + と/戸 + け/犬 = 綟
- - む/車 + 宿 + け/犬 = 飆

==== Compounds of 天 ====
- - な/亻 + selector 1 + け/犬 = 俣
- - 日 + selector 1 + け/犬 = 昊

==== Compounds of 太 ====
- - け/犬 + そ/馬 = 駄

==== Compounds of 夫 ====
- - て/扌 + け/犬 = 扶
- - 日 + け/犬 = 替
  - - 氷/氵 + け/犬 = 潜
    - - 氷/氵 + 氷/氵 + け/犬 = 潛
    - - selector 1 + 氷/氵 + け/犬 = 濳
  - - な/亻 + 日 + け/犬 = 僣
  - - 仁/亻 + 日 + け/犬 = 僭
  - - え/訁 + 日 + け/犬 = 譛
- - を/貝 + け/犬 = 賛
  - - を/貝 + を/貝 + け/犬 = 贊
  - - て/扌 + を/貝 + け/犬 = 攅
  - - い/糹/#2 + を/貝 + け/犬 = 纉
  - - え/訁 + を/貝 + け/犬 = 讃
  - - か/金 + を/貝 + け/犬 = 鑚
- - け/犬 + 宿 = 規
  - - 心 + け/犬 + 宿 = 槻
- - け/犬 + ぬ/力 = 券
  - - け/犬 + け/犬 + ぬ/力 = 劵
    - - き/木 + け/犬 + ぬ/力 = 椦
- - け/犬 + さ/阝 = 巻
  - - け/犬 + け/犬 + さ/阝 = 卷
    - - な/亻 + け/犬 + さ/阝 = 倦
    - - る/忄 + け/犬 + さ/阝 = 惓
    - - て/扌 + け/犬 + さ/阝 = 捲
    - - い/糹/#2 + け/犬 + さ/阝 = 綣
    - - む/車 + け/犬 + さ/阝 = 蜷
- - け/犬 + て/扌 = 拳
- - け/犬 + ほ/方 = 奉
  - - な/亻 + け/犬 + ほ/方 = 俸
  - - て/扌 + け/犬 + ほ/方 = 捧
- - け/犬 + け/犬 = 奏
  - - に/氵 + け/犬 + け/犬 = 湊
  - - む/車 + け/犬 + け/犬 = 輳
- - け/犬 + 日 = 春
  - - る/忄 + け/犬 + 日 = 惷
  - - 心 + け/犬 + 日 = 椿
  - - せ/食 + け/犬 + 日 = 鰆
- - け/犬 + に/氵 = 泰
  - - ら/月 + け/犬 + に/氵 = 滕
- - け/犬 + の/禾 = 秦
  - - 心 + け/犬 + の/禾 = 榛
  - - ゆ/彳 + け/犬 + の/禾 = 臻
  - - く/艹 + け/犬 + の/禾 = 蓁
- - た/⽥ + selector 3 + け/犬 = 畉
- - 心 + selector 3 + け/犬 = 芙
- - み/耳 + selector 3 + け/犬 = 趺
- - む/車 + selector 3 + け/犬 = 輦
- - す/発 + selector 3 + け/犬 = 麸
- - ら/月 + け/犬 + ゐ/幺 = 縢
- - め/目 + 宿 + け/犬 = 眷
- - け/犬 + selector 6 + ぬ/力 = 舂
- - け/犬 + 宿 + そ/馬 = 豢
- - す/発 + 宿 + け/犬 = 麩

==== Compounds of 夭 ====
- - け/犬 + る/忄 = 忝
- - れ/口 + け/犬 = 咲
- - ら/月 + け/犬 = 朕
- - ち/竹 + け/犬 = 笑
- - ひ/辶 + け/犬 = 送
  - - か/金 + ひ/辶 + け/犬 = 鎹
- - も/門 + け/犬 = 関
  - - も/門 + も/門 + け/犬 = 關
- - け/犬 + 囗 = 呑
- - り/分 + け/犬 = 兼
  - - よ/广 + け/犬 = 廉
    - - に/氵 + よ/广 + け/犬 = 濂
    - - ち/竹 + よ/广 + け/犬 = 簾
  - - ゑ/訁 + け/犬 = 謙
  - - け/犬 + ふ/女 = 嫌
  - - る/忄 + り/分 + け/犬 = 慊
  - - ん/止 + り/分 + け/犬 = 歉
  - - 心 + り/分 + け/犬 = 蒹
  - - を/貝 + り/分 + け/犬 = 賺
- - ふ/女 + 宿 + け/犬 = 妖
- - ほ/方 + 宿 + け/犬 = 殀
- - に/氵 + 宿 + け/犬 = 沃
- - せ/食 + 龸 + け/犬 = 飫

==== Compounds of 咢 ====
- - せ/食 + け/犬 = 鰐
- - る/忄 + 宿 + け/犬 = 愕
- - け/犬 + ん/止 + の/禾 = 齶
- - く/艹 + 宿 + け/犬 = 萼
- - く/艹 + 龸 + け/犬 = 蕚
- - え/訁 + 宿 + け/犬 = 諤
- - さ/阝 + 宿 + け/犬 = 鄂
- - か/金 + 宿 + け/犬 = 鍔
- - け/犬 + 龸 + せ/食 = 鶚

==== Compounds of 失 and 夸 ====
- - の/禾 + け/犬 = 秩
- - え/訁 + け/犬 = 誇
- - は/辶 + け/犬 = 迭
- - か/金 + け/犬 = 鉄
  - - か/金 + か/金 + け/犬 = 鐵
- - な/亻 + selector 6 + け/犬 = 佚
- - し/巿 + selector 6 + け/犬 = 帙
- - み/耳 + selector 6 + け/犬 = 跌
- - む/車 + selector 6 + け/犬 = 軼

==== Compounds of 鼬 and 鼡 ====
- - け/犬 + ろ/十 = 猟
  - - け/犬 + け/犬 + ろ/十 = 獵
- - け/犬 + け/犬 + selector 5 = 鼠
  - - う/宀/#3 + け/犬 + selector 5 = 竄
  - - と/戸 + け/犬 + selector 5 = 鬣

==== Compounds of 猫 and ⺨ ====
- - た/⽥ + け/犬 = 猥
- - け/犬 + は/辶 = 犯
- - け/犬 + へ/⺩ = 狂
  - - え/訁 + け/犬 + へ/⺩ = 誑
- - け/犬 + こ/子 = 狐
- - け/犬 + も/門 = 狗
- - け/犬 + う/宀/#3 = 狙
- - け/犬 + す/発 = 狢
- - け/犬 + し/巿 = 狩
- - け/犬 + む/車 = 独
  - - け/犬 + け/犬 + む/車 = 獨
- - け/犬 + な/亻 = 狭
  - - け/犬 + け/犬 + な/亻 = 狹
- - け/犬 + や/疒 = 狼
- - け/犬 + ⺼ = 猛
- - け/犬 + り/分 = 猪
  - - に/氵 + け/犬 + り/分 = 潴
- - け/犬 + せ/食 = 猶
  - - 心 + け/犬 + せ/食 = 蕕
- - け/犬 + え/訁 = 猿
- - け/犬 + ゑ/訁 = 獄
- - け/犬 + ら/月 = 獅
- - け/犬 + く/艹 = 獲
- - け/犬 + selector 6 + そ/馬 = 狃
- - け/犬 + ろ/十 + selector 4 = 犲
- - け/犬 + 宿 + 仁/亻 = 犹
- - け/犬 + 宿 + 火 = 狄
- - け/犬 + 比 + 宿 = 狆
- - け/犬 + 数 + こ/子 = 狎
- - け/犬 + 宿 + め/目 = 狒
- - け/犬 + 日 + selector 1 = 狛
- - け/犬 + selector 3 + や/疒 = 狠
- - け/犬 + 龸 + ち/竹 = 狡
- - け/犬 + 宿 + ら/月 = 狷
- - け/犬 + 比 + り/分 = 狸
- - け/犬 + 宿 + を/貝 = 狽
- - け/犬 + 宿 + 宿 = 猊
- - け/犬 + り/分 + 日 = 猖
- - け/犬 + し/巿 + せ/食 = 猜
- - け/犬 + お/頁 + ろ/十 = 猝
- - け/犬 + 日 + い/糹/#2 = 猩
- - け/犬 + 宿 + の/禾 = 猯
- - け/犬 + 仁/亻 + や/疒 = 猴
- - け/犬 + か/金 + ら/月 = 猾
- - け/犬 + 宿 + く/艹 = 獏
- - け/犬 + ん/止 + selector 1 = 獗
- - け/犬 + り/分 + え/訁 = 獪
- - け/犬 + 宿 + て/扌 = 獰
- - け/犬 + お/頁 + 数 = 獺

==== Compounds of 大 ====
- - 囗 + け/犬 = 因
  - - ふ/女 + け/犬 = 姻
  - - け/犬 + 心 = 恩
  - - れ/口 + 囗 + け/犬 = 咽
  - - も/門 + 囗 + け/犬 = 氤
  - - 火 + 囗 + け/犬 = 烟
  - - く/艹 + 囗 + け/犬 = 茵
- - け/犬 + か/金 = 奇
  - - つ/土 + け/犬 = 埼
  - - や/疒 + け/犬 = 崎
  - - 心 + け/犬 = 椅
  - - ぬ/力 + け/犬 = 契
    - - き/木 + ぬ/力 + け/犬 = 楔
    - - ね/示 + ぬ/力 + け/犬 = 禊
  - - な/亻 + け/犬 + か/金 = 倚
  - - ぬ/力 + け/犬 + か/金 = 剞
  - - て/扌 + け/犬 + か/金 = 掎
  - - ん/止 + け/犬 + か/金 = 欹
  - - け/犬 + け/犬 + か/金 = 猗
  - - た/⽥ + け/犬 + か/金 = 畸
  - - selector 1 + け/犬 + か/金 = 竒
  - - い/糹/#2 + け/犬 + か/金 = 綺
  - - す/発 + け/犬 + か/金 = 羇
  - - け/犬 + け/犬 + か/金 = 猗
- - と/戸 + け/犬 = 戻
  - - に/氵 + け/犬 = 涙
- - け/犬 + お/頁 = 央
  - - ほ/方 + け/犬 + お/頁 = 殃
  - - に/氵 + け/犬 + お/頁 = 泱
  - - の/禾 + け/犬 + お/頁 = 秧
  - - と/戸 + け/犬 + お/頁 = 鞅
- - け/犬 + 仁/亻 = 奈
  - - て/扌 + け/犬 + 仁/亻 = 捺
- - け/犬 + と/戸 = 奔
  - - く/艹 + け/犬 + と/戸 = 莽
    - - む/車 + け/犬 + と/戸 = 蠎
- - け/犬 + い/糹/#2 = 奪
- - け/犬 + た/⽥ = 奮
- - き/木 + け/犬 = 権
  - - き/木 + き/木 + け/犬 = 權
- - け/犬 + ね/示 = 勧
  - - け/犬 + け/犬 + ね/示 = 勸
- - け/犬 + ん/止 = 歓
  - - け/犬 + け/犬 + ん/止 = 歡
- - け/犬 + め/目 = 観
  - - 心 + け/犬 + め/目 = 欟
  - - け/犬 + け/犬 + め/目 = 觀
- - え/訁 + 比 + け/犬 = 奕
- - せ/食 + 比 + け/犬 = 奠
- - そ/馬 + 比 + け/犬 = 尖
- - ぬ/力 + 宿 + け/犬 = 刳
- - け/犬 + も/門 + selector 2 = 匏
- - け/犬 + 宿 + ろ/十 = 夲
- - け/犬 + 宿 + つ/土 = 奎
- - け/犬 + 宿 + と/戸 = 套
- - け/犬 + へ/⺩ + つ/土 = 奘
- - け/犬 + と/戸 + 日 = 奢
- - け/犬 + も/門 + selector 3 = 奩
- - や/疒 + う/宀/#3 + け/犬 = 嵜
- - る/忄 + 龸 + け/犬 = 懽
- - き/木 + 龸 + け/犬 = 桍
- - け/犬 + き/木 + き/木 = 樊
- - 氷/氵 + 宿 + け/犬 = 潅
- - 氷/氵 + 龸 + け/犬 = 灌
- - け/犬 + 心 + つ/土 = 瓠
- - け/犬 + 宿 + た/⽥ = 畚
- - ま/石 + 宿 + け/犬 = 碕
- - ⺼ + 宿 + け/犬 = 胯
- - ね/示 + 宿 + け/犬 = 袴
- - え/訁 + 龸 + け/犬 = 讙
- - み/耳 + 宿 + け/犬 = 跨
- - か/金 + 龸 + け/犬 = 鑵
- - お/頁 + 宿 + け/犬 = 顴
- - そ/馬 + 宿 + け/犬 = 驩
- - け/犬 + 宿 + せ/食 = 鸛

==== Other compounds ====
- - 仁/亻 + け/犬 = 傑
- - ゆ/彳 + け/犬 = 径
  - - ゆ/彳 + ゆ/彳 + け/犬 = 徑
- - る/忄 + け/犬 = 怪
- - い/糹/#2 + け/犬 = 経
  - - い/糹/#2 + い/糹/#2 + け/犬 = 經
- - く/艹 + け/犬 = 茎
  - - く/艹 + く/艹 + け/犬 = 莖
- - む/車 + け/犬 = 軽
  - - む/車 + む/車 + け/犬 = 輕
- - ⺼ + け/犬 = 脛
- - お/頁 + け/犬 = 頚
- - ん/止 + け/犬 = 罐
- - む/車 + け/犬 + ほ/方 = 蚌
- - け/犬 + 宿 + ね/示 = 剄
- - け/犬 + 宿 + ぬ/力 = 勁
- - け/犬 + 宿 + う/宀/#3 = 尨
- - け/犬 + 宿 + す/発 = 彗
  - - け/犬 + 宿 + 心 = 慧
- - き/木 + 宿 + け/犬 = 桀
- - や/疒 + 宿 + け/犬 = 痙
- - ⺼ + 囗 + け/犬 = 臙
- - け/犬 + う/宀/#3 + り/分 = 豬
- - け/犬 + す/発 + れ/口 = 貉
- - ひ/辶 + 宿 + け/犬 = 逕
- - か/金 + う/宀/#3 + け/犬 = 鐡
- - お/頁 + 龸 + け/犬 = 頸
