= Braille pattern dots-13456 =

Braille pattern

6-dot braille cells
⠀	⠁	⠃	⠉	⠙	⠑	⠋	⠛	⠓	⠊	⠚	⠈	⠘
⠄	⠅	⠇	⠍	⠝	⠕	⠏	⠟	⠗	⠎	⠞	⠌	⠜
⠤	⠥	⠧	⠭	⠽	⠵	⠯	⠿	⠷	⠮	⠾	⠬	⠼
⠠	⠡	⠣	⠩	⠹	⠱	⠫	⠻	⠳	⠪	⠺	⠨	⠸
shift down	⠂	⠆	⠒	⠲	⠢	⠖	⠶	⠦	⠔	⠴	⠐	⠰

The Braille pattern dots-13456 ( ⠽ ) is a 6-dot braille cell with both top, the middle right, and both bottom dots raised, or an 8-dot braille cell with both top, the upper-middle right, and both lower-middle dots raised. It is represented by the Unicode code point U+283d, and in Braille ASCII with Y.

Character information
Preview	⠽ (braille pattern dots-13456)	
Unicode name	BRAILLE PATTERN DOTS-13456	
Encodings	decimal	hex
Unicode	10301	U+283D
UTF-8	226 160 189	E2 A0 BD
Numeric character reference	&#10301;	&#x283D;
Braille ASCII	89	59

== Unified Braille ==
In unified international braille, the braille pattern dots-13456 is used to represent a palatal approximant or near-close near-front vowel, such as /j/ or /ʏ/, or otherwise as needed.

=== Table of unified braille values ===
French Braille	Y
English Braille	Y
English Contraction	you
German Braille	Y, el
Bharati Braille	य / ਯ / ય / য / ଯ / య / ಯ / യ / ய / ය / ی
Icelandic Braille	Y
IPA Braille	/y/
Russian Braille	I
Slovak Braille	Y
Arabic Braille	ئ
Irish Braille	Y
Thai Braille	ย y
Luxembourgish Braille	y (minuscule)

== Other braille ==
Japanese Braille	mu / む / ム
Korean Braille	oe / ㅚ
Mainland Chinese Braille	wai, -uai
Taiwanese Braille	ying, -ing / ㄧㄥ, 〕 (end bracket)
Two-Cell Chinese Braille	cu- -ǎng
Algerian Braille	م

== Plus dots 7 and 8 ==
Related to Braille pattern dots-13456 are Braille patterns 134567, 134568, and 1345678, which are used in 8-dot braille systems, such as Gardner-Salinas and Luxembourgish Braille.

Character information
Preview	⡽ (braille pattern dots-134567)		⢽ (braille pattern dots-134568)		⣽ (braille pattern dots-1345678)	
Unicode name	BRAILLE PATTERN DOTS-134567		BRAILLE PATTERN DOTS-134568		BRAILLE PATTERN DOTS-1345678	
Encodings	decimal	hex	dec	hex	dec	hex
Unicode	10365	U+287D	10429	U+28BD	10493	U+28FD
UTF-8	226 161 189	E2 A1 BD	226 162 189	E2 A2 BD	226 163 189	E2 A3 BD
Numeric character reference	&#10365;	&#x287D;	&#10429;	&#x28BD;	&#10493;	&#x28FD;

	dots 134567	dots 134568	dots 1345678
Gardner Salinas Braille	Y (capital)	ψ (psi)	Ψ (Psi)
Luxembourgish Braille	Y (capital)		

== Related 8-dot kantenji patterns ==
In the Japanese kantenji braille, the standard 8-dot Braille patterns 25678, 125678, 245678, and 1245678 are the patterns related to Braille pattern dots-13456, since the two additional dots of kantenji patterns 013456, 134567, and 0134567 are placed above the base 6-dot cell, instead of below, as in standard 8-dot braille.

Character information
Preview	⣲ (braille pattern dots-25678)		⣳ (braille pattern dots-125678)		⣺ (braille pattern dots-245678)		⣻ (braille pattern dots-1245678)	
Unicode name	BRAILLE PATTERN DOTS-25678		BRAILLE PATTERN DOTS-125678		BRAILLE PATTERN DOTS-245678		BRAILLE PATTERN DOTS-1245678	
Encodings	decimal	hex	dec	hex	dec	hex	dec	hex
Unicode	10482	U+28F2	10483	U+28F3	10490	U+28FA	10491	U+28FB
UTF-8	226 163 178	E2 A3 B2	226 163 179	E2 A3 B3	226 163 186	E2 A3 BA	226 163 187	E2 A3 BB
Numeric character reference	&#10482;	&#x28F2;	&#10483;	&#x28F3;	&#10490;	&#x28FA;	&#10491;	&#x28FB;

=== Kantenji using braille patterns 25678, 125678, 245678, or 1245678 ===
This listing includes kantenji using Braille pattern dots-13456 for all 6349 kanji found in JIS C 6226-1978.

- - 車

==== Variants and thematic compounds ====
- - selector 2 + む/車 = 厶
- - selector 3 + む/車 = 冓
- - selector 4 + む/車 = 蜀
- - selector 5 + む/車 = 牟
- - selector 6 + む/車 = 矣
- - む/車 + selector 1 = 虫
- - む/車 + selector 2 = 羽
- - む/車 + selector 5 = 虱
- - む/車 + 宿 = 風

==== Compounds of 車 ====
- - よ/广 + む/車 = 庫
- - て/扌 + む/車 = 揮
- - 日 + む/車 = 暫
- - ち/竹 + む/車 = 範
- - ね/示 + む/車 = 褌
- - 宿 + む/車 = 軍
  - - 龸 + む/車 = 輝
  - - は/辶 + む/車 = 運
  - - 日 + 龸 + む/車 = 暉
  - - 日 + 宿 + む/車 = 暈
  - - に/氵 + 宿 + む/車 = 渾
  - - へ/⺩ + 宿 + む/車 = 琿
  - - ひ/辶 + 宿 + む/車 = 皹
  - - く/艹 + 宿 + む/車 = 葷
  - - え/訁 + 宿 + む/車 = 諢
- - み/耳 + む/車 = 載
- - 火 + む/車 = 輩
- - ひ/辶 + む/車 = 連
  - - れ/口 + ひ/辶 + む/車 = 嗹
  - - に/氵 + ひ/辶 + む/車 = 漣
  - - い/糹/#2 + ひ/辶 + む/車 = 縺
  - - か/金 + ひ/辶 + む/車 = 鏈
- - さ/阝 + む/車 = 陣
- - む/車 + の/禾 = 撃
- - む/車 + を/貝 = 斬
  - - つ/土 + む/車 + を/貝 = 塹
  - - や/疒 + む/車 + を/貝 = 嶄
  - - る/忄 + む/車 + を/貝 = 慙
  - - き/木 + む/車 + を/貝 = 槧
  - - か/金 + む/車 + を/貝 = 鏨
- - む/車 + ゐ/幺 = 繋
- - む/車 + お/頁 = 軌
- - む/車 + か/金 = 軒
- - む/車 + ん/止 = 軟
- - む/車 + て/扌 = 転
  - - む/車 + む/車 + て/扌 = 轉
    - - れ/口 + む/車 + て/扌 = 囀
- - む/車 + た/⽥ = 軸
- - む/車 + け/犬 = 軽
  - - む/車 + む/車 + け/犬 = 輕
- - む/車 + ち/竹 = 較
- - む/車 + る/忄 = 輪
- - む/車 + み/耳 = 輯
- - む/車 + ゆ/彳 = 輸
- - む/車 + す/発 = 輹
- - む/車 + ふ/女 = 輻
- - む/車 + へ/⺩ = 轄
- - む/車 + ら/月 = 轍
- - む/車 + う/宀/#3 = 轟
  - - selector 4 + む/車 + う/宀/#3 = 軣
- - な/亻 + 宿 + む/車 = 俥
- - る/忄 + 龸 + む/車 = 慚
- - む/車 + 宿 + を/貝 = 軋
- - む/車 + よ/广 + さ/阝 = 軛
- - む/車 + 龸 + う/宀/#3 = 軫
- - む/車 + 比 + か/金 = 軻
- - む/車 + selector 6 + け/犬 = 軼
- - む/車 + 囗 + selector 2 = 軾
- - む/車 + す/発 + れ/口 = 輅
- - む/車 + 宿 + ゆ/彳 = 輊
- - む/車 + う/宀/#3 + ち/竹 = 輌
- - む/車 + 宿 + み/耳 = 輒
- - む/車 + 宿 + 宿 = 輓
- - む/車 + 宿 + ほ/方 = 輔
- - む/車 + み/耳 + ゑ/訁 = 輙
- - む/車 + ち/竹 + selector 4 = 輛
- - む/車 + ら/月 + た/⽥ = 輜
- - む/車 + 宿 + ゑ/訁 = 輟
- - む/車 + selector 3 + け/犬 = 輦
- - む/車 + け/犬 + け/犬 = 輳
- - む/車 + と/戸 + と/戸 = 輾
- - む/車 + 宿 + 囗 = 輿
- - む/車 + 龸 + の/禾 = 轂
- - む/車 + 宿 + え/訁 = 轅
- - む/車 + そ/馬 + 比 = 轆
- - む/車 + ち/竹 +

せ/食 = 轌

- - む/車 + う/宀/#3 + の/禾 = 轎
- - む/車 + ひ/辶 + 心 = 轗
- - む/車 + 宿 + ち/竹 = 轜
- - む/車 + 宿 + れ/口 = 轡
- - む/車 + 日 + ゐ/幺 = 轢
- - む/車 + こ/子 + ん/止 = 轣
- - む/車 + 宿 + た/⽥ = 轤

==== Compounds of 厶 ====
- - な/亻 + む/車 = 俊
- - も/門 + む/車 = 勾
- - る/忄 + む/車 = 悛
- - む/車 + と/戸 = 弁
  - - む/車 + む/車 + と/戸 = 辨
    - - selector 4 + む/車 + と/戸 = 辧
    - - む/車 + 宿 + ゐ/幺 = 辮
    - - む/車 + 龸 + と/戸 = 辯
    - - む/車 + 心 + つ/土 = 瓣
  - - や/疒 + む/車 + と/戸 = 峅
- - ち/竹 + selector 2 + む/車 = 簒
- - む/車 + 宿 + 龸 = 允
- - れ/口 + 宿 + む/車 = 吮
- - ゆ/彳 + 宿 + む/車 = 弘

==== Compounds of 冓 ====
- - き/木 + む/車 = 構
- - に/氵 + む/車 = 溝
- - ゑ/訁 + む/車 = 講
- - を/貝 + む/車 = 購
- - ひ/辶 + selector 3 + む/車 = 遘
- - ふ/女 + 宿 + む/車 = 媾
- - て/扌 + 龸 + む/車 = 搆
- - め/目 + 宿 + む/車 = 覯
- - ち/竹 + 宿 + む/車 = 篝

==== Compounds of 蜀 ====
- - 氷/氵 + む/車 = 濁
- - み/耳 + selector 4 + む/車 = 躅
- - む/車 + か/金 + ら/月 = 髑
- - 火 + 宿 + む/車 = 燭

==== Compounds of 牟 ====
- - か/金 + む/車 = 鉾
- - き/木 + selector 5 + む/車 = 桙
- - め/目 + selector 5 + む/車 = 眸
- - む/車 + 龸 + せ/食 = 鴾

==== Compounds of 矣 ====
- - つ/土 + む/車 = 埃
- - む/車 + や/疒 = 挨
- - な/亻 + selector 6 + む/車 = 俟
- - ん/止 + selector 6 + む/車 = 欸
- - ま/石 + selector 6 + む/車 = 竢
- - や/疒 + う/宀/#3 + む/車 = 峻
- - き/木 + 宿 + む/車 = 梭
- - に/氵 + 龸 + む/車 = 浚
- - む/車 + selector 4 + ひ/辶 = 皴
- - ま/石 + 宿 + む/車 = 竣
- - ひ/辶 + う/宀/#3 + む/車 = 逡
- - そ/馬 + 宿 + む/車 = 駿

==== Compounds of 虫 ====
- - む/車 + む/車 + む/車 = 蟲
- - ゆ/彳 + む/車 = 強
  - - い/糹/#2 + ゆ/彳 + む/車 = 繦
  - - ね/示 + ゆ/彳 + む/車 = 襁
- - け/犬 + む/車 = 独
  - - け/犬 + け/犬 + む/車 = 獨
- - い/糹/#2 + む/車 = 繭
- - む/車 + む/車 = 蚕
- - え/訁 + む/車 = 蛮
  - - え/訁 + え/訁 + む/車 = 蠻
- - ほ/方 + む/車 = 蜂
- - う/宀/#3 + む/車 = 蜜
  - - 心 + う/宀/#3 + む/車 = 櫁
- - せ/食 + む/車 = 蝕
- - れ/口 + む/車 = 融
- - 囗 + む/車 = 触
  - - 囗 + 囗 + む/車 = 觸
- - そ/馬 + む/車 = 騒
  - - そ/馬 + そ/馬 + む/車 = 騷
- - む/車 + 龸 = 蚊
- - む/車 + ゑ/訁 = 蚤
- - む/車 + ひ/辶 = 蛇
- - む/車 + つ/土 = 蛙
- - む/車 + ⺼ = 蛸
- - む/車 + 囗 = 蛾
- - む/車 + れ/口 = 蝉
- - む/車 + ろ/十 = 蝋
- - む/車 + よ/广 = 蝶
- - む/車 + め/目 = 蝿
- - む/車 + そ/馬 = 蟻
- - む/車 + ぬ/力 = 蠢
- - む/車 + い/糹/#2 = 雖
- - れ/口 + む/車 + selector 1 = 嗤
- - は/辶 + む/車 + selector 1 = 蜑
- - て/扌 + 宿 + む/車 = 掻
- - む/車 + selector 5 + ほ/方 = 虻
- - む/車 + 囗 + 仁/亻 = 蚋
- - む/車 + け/犬 + ほ/方 = 蚌
- - む/車 + ゆ/彳 + selector 4 = 蚓
- - む/車 + selector 6 + こ/子 = 蚣
- - む/車 + 宿 + や/疒 = 蚩
- - む/車 + 比 + と/戸 = 蚪
- - む/車 + も/門 + selector 2 = 蚫
- - む/車 + く/艹 + selector 4 = 蚯
- - む/車 + た/⽥ + selector 4 = 蚰
- - む/車 + selector 4 + る/忄 = 蚶
- - む/車 + れ/口 + ろ/十 = 蛄
- - む/車 + selector 5 + そ/馬 = 蛆
- - む/車 + 仁/亻 + ろ/十 = 蛉
- - む/車 + 数 + ま/石 = 蛎
- - む/車 + 囗 + れ/口 = 蛔
- - む/車 + selector 5 + か/金 = 蛛
- - む/車 + れ/口 + せ/食 = 蛞
- - む/車 + 龸 + ち/竹 = 蛟
- - む/車 + り/分 + 囗 = 蛤
- - む/車 + 龸 + 龸 = 蛩
- - む/車 + selector 4 + こ/子 = 蛬
- - む/車 + selector 4 + ゆ/彳 = 蛭
- - む/車 + と/戸 + selector 2 = 蛯
- - む/車 + 囗 + selector 3 = 蛹
- - む/車 + 龸 + 宿 = 蛻
- - む/車 + 宿 + ろ/十 = 蜃
- - む/車 + め/目 + 宿 = 蜆
- - む/車 + selector 5 + こ/子 = 蜈
- - む/車 + 氷/氵 + う/宀/#3 = 蜉
- - む/車 + の/禾 + ぬ/力 = 蜊
- - む/車 + り/分 + も/門 = 蜍
- - む/車 + は/辶 + selector 1 = 蜒
- - む/車 + や/疒 + れ/口 = 蜘
- - む/車 + selector 4 + 火 = 蜚
- - む/車 + き/木 + お/頁 = 蜥
- - む/車 + 囗 + つ/土 = 蜩
- - む/車 + 日 + 数 = 蜴
- - む/車 + け/犬 + さ/阝 = 蜷
- - む/車 + し/巿 + せ/食 = 蜻
- - む/車 + 宿 + う/宀/#3 = 蜿
- - む/車 + の/禾 + と/戸 = 蝌
- - む/車 + 宿 + 氷/氵 = 蝎
- - む/車 + selector 5 + ゆ/彳 = 蝓
- - む/車 + 龸 + へ/⺩ = 蝗
- - む/車 + 宿 + へ/⺩ = 蝙
- - む/車 + た/⽥ + ⺼ = 蝟
- - む/車 + 宿 + ふ/女 = 蝠
- - む/車 + は/辶 + selector 3 = 蝣
- - む/車 + 宿 + の/禾 = 蝦
- - む/車 + selector 6 + ろ/十 = 蝨
- - む/車 + 宿 + 数 = 蝪
- - む/車 + 宿 + す/発 = 蝮
- - む/車 + selector 6 + ら/月 = 蝴
- - む/車 + 宿 + か/金 = 蝸
- - む/車 + や/疒 + さ/阝 = 螂
- - む/車 + 龸 + 日 = 螟
- - む/車 + か/金 + 氷/氵 = 螫
- - む/車 + selector 3 + ほ/方 = 螯
- - む/車 + 龸 + つ/土 = 螳
- - む/車 + た/⽥ + ゐ/幺 = 螺
- - む/車 + 宿 + る/忄 = 螻
- - む/車 + す/発 + selector 1 = 螽
- - む/車 + 龸 + ろ/十 = 蟀
- - む/車 + つ/土 + お/頁 = 蟄
- - む/車 + selector 6 + く/艹 = 蟆
- - む/車 + 宿 + く/艹 = 蟇
- - む/車 + 宿 + 心 = 蟋
- - む/車 + 龸 + し/巿 = 蟐
- - む/車 + 宿 + と/戸 = 蟒
- - む/車 + の/禾 + た/⽥ = 蟠
- - む/車 + 宿 + つ/土 = 蟯
- - む/車 + み/耳 + へ/⺩ = 蟶
- - む/車 + 龸 + ふ/女 = 蟷
- - む/車 + 囗 + そ/馬 = 蟹
- - む/車 + 宿 + 日 = 蟾
- - む/車 + 宿 + め/目 = 蠅
- - む/車 + ん/止 + selector 1 = 蠍
- - む/車 + け/犬 + と/戸 = 蠎
- - む/車 + 龸 + 囗 = 蠏
- - む/車 + 龸 + き/木 = 蠑
- - む/車 + ち/竹 + の/禾 = 蠕
- - む/車 + 龸 + く/艹 = 蠖
- - む/車 + 宿 + そ/馬 = 蠡
- - む/車 + 宿 + よ/广 = 蠣
- - む/車 + 宿 + ま/石 = 蠧
- - む/車 + 宿 + ⺼ = 蠱
- - む/車 + 宿 + む/車 = 蠶
- - む/車 + 龸 + ま/石 = 蠹

==== Compounds of 羽 ====
- - と/戸 + む/車 = 扇
  - - 火 + と/戸 + む/車 = 煽
- - こ/子 + む/車 = 翁
  - - く/艹 + こ/子 + む/車 = 蓊
- - ろ/十 + む/車 = 翰
  - - に/氵 + ろ/十 + む/車 = 瀚
- - た/⽥ + む/車 = 翻
  - - た/⽥ + た/⽥ + む/車 = 飜
- - ⺼ + む/車 = 膠
- - む/車 + ま/石 = 翌
- - む/車 + 日 = 習
  - - る/忄 + む/車 + 日 = 慴
  - - て/扌 + む/車 + 日 = 摺
  - - ね/示 + む/車 + 日 = 褶
- - む/車 + こ/子 = 翼
- - ぬ/力 + む/車 + selector 2 = 勠
- - よ/广 + む/車 + selector 2 = 廖
- - て/扌 + む/車 + selector 2 = 挧
- - き/木 + む/車 + selector 2 = 榻
- - い/糹/#2 + む/車 + selector 2 = 繆
- - は/辶 + む/車 + selector 2 = 翅
- - ま/石 + む/車 + selector 2 = 翊
- - そ/馬 + む/車 + selector 2 = 翔
- - り/分 + む/車 + selector 2 = 翕
- - 火 + む/車 + selector 2 = 翡
- - へ/⺩ + む/車 + selector 2 = 翩
- - も/門 + む/車 + selector 2 = 翳
- - つ/土 + む/車 + selector 2 = 翹
- - 心 + む/車 + selector 2 = 蓼
- - え/訁 + む/車 + selector 2 = 謬
- - せ/食 + む/車 + selector 2 = 醪
- - か/金 + む/車 + selector 2 = 鏐
- - む/車 + selector 4 + 囗 = 戮
- - 心 + 龸 + む/車 = 栩
- - き/木 + 龸 + む/車 = 樛
- - む/車 + 宿 + お/頁 = 翆
- - む/車 + お/頁 + ろ/十 = 翠
- - む/車 + ら/月 + ぬ/力 = 翦
- - む/車 + selector 1 + 宿 = 翫

==== Compounds of 虱 and 風 ====
- - や/疒 + む/車 = 嵐
- - 心 + む/車 = 楓
- - む/車 + な/亻 = 颱
- - や/疒 + む/車 + 宿 = 瘋
- - え/訁 + む/車 + 宿 = 諷
- - 龸 + む/車 + 宿 = 颪
- - ま/石 + む/車 + 宿 = 颯
- - む/車 + 宿 + に/氵 = 飃
- - む/車 + 宿 + け/犬 = 飆
- - む/車 + を/貝 + selector 5 = 颶
- - む/車 + に/氵 + ね/示 = 飄

==== Other compounds ====
- - ん/止 + む/車 = 凪
- - む/車 + し/巿 = 凧
  - - な/亻 + む/車 + し/巿 = 佩
  - - へ/⺩ + む/車 + し/巿 = 珮
- - き/木 + む/車 + 宿 = 凩
- - む/車 + 日 + へ/⺩ = 凰
- - む/車 + 宿 + せ/食 = 鳳
- - む/車 + 心 = 恵
  - - む/車 + む/車 + 心 = 惠
  - - の/禾 + む/車 = 穂
    - - の/禾 + の/禾 + む/車 = 穗
- - む/車 + 氷/氵 = 敷
- - む/車 + 火 = 無
  - - れ/口 + む/車 + 火 = 嘸
  - - よ/广 + む/車 + 火 = 廡
  - - る/忄 + む/車 + 火 = 憮
  - - て/扌 + む/車 + 火 = 撫
  - - 心 + む/車 + 火 = 蕪
- - む/車 + ほ/方 = 舞
- - め/目 + む/車 = 睦
- - し/巿 + む/車 = 紫
- - む/車 + そ/馬 + selector 2 = 恙
- - ひ/辶 + 龸 + む/車 = 逵
- - に/氵 + う/宀/#3 + む/車 = 淕
