= Braille pattern dots-135 =

Braille pattern

6-dot braille cells
⠀	⠁	⠃	⠉	⠙	⠑	⠋	⠛	⠓	⠊	⠚	⠈	⠘
⠄	⠅	⠇	⠍	⠝	⠕	⠏	⠟	⠗	⠎	⠞	⠌	⠜
⠤	⠥	⠧	⠭	⠽	⠵	⠯	⠿	⠷	⠮	⠾	⠬	⠼
⠠	⠡	⠣	⠩	⠹	⠱	⠫	⠻	⠳	⠪	⠺	⠨	⠸
shift down	⠂	⠆	⠒	⠲	⠢	⠖	⠶	⠦	⠔	⠴	⠐	⠰

The Braille pattern dots-135 (⠕) is a 6-dot braille cell with the top and bottom left, and middle right dots raised, or an 8-dot braille cell with the top and lower-middle left, and upper-middle right dots raised. It is represented by the Unicode code point U+2815, and in Braille ASCII with the letter "O".

Character information
Preview	⠕ (braille pattern dots-135)	
Unicode name	BRAILLE PATTERN DOTS-135	
Encodings	decimal	hex
Unicode	10261	U+2815
UTF-8	226 160 149	E2 A0 95
Numeric character reference	&#10261;	&#x2815;
Braille ASCII	79	4F

== Unified Braille ==
In unified international braille, the braille pattern dots-135 is used to represent close-mid to open-mid back rounded vowels, such as /o/, /o̞/, or /ɔ/.

=== Table of unified braille values ===
French Braille	O, "nous"
English Braille	o
German Braille	O
Bharati Braille	ओ / ਓ / ઓ / ও / ଓ / ఓ / ಓ / ഓ / ஓ / ඕ / و
Icelandic Braille	O
IPA Braille	/o/
Russian Braille	О
Slovak Braille	O
Arabic Braille	ى
Irish Braille	O
Thai Braille	อ [ʔ], ◌อ aw
Luxembourgish Braille	o (minuscule)

== Other braille ==
Japanese Braille	ta / た / タ
Korean Braille	i / ㅣ
Mainland Chinese Braille	wo, -uo
Taiwanese Braille	b- / ㄅ, ? (question mark), ")" (end parenthesis)
Two-Cell Chinese Braille	qi- -ēng
Nemeth Braille	long division sign
Algerian Braille	ض

== Plus dots 7 and 8 ==
Related to Braille pattern dots-135 are Braille patterns 1357, 1358, and 13578, which are used in 8-dot braille systems, such as Gardner-Salinas and Luxembourgish Braille.

Character information
Preview	⡕ (braille pattern dots-1357)		⢕ (braille pattern dots-1358)		⣕ (braille pattern dots-13578)	
Unicode name	BRAILLE PATTERN DOTS-1357		BRAILLE PATTERN DOTS-1358		BRAILLE PATTERN DOTS-13578	
Encodings	decimal	hex	dec	hex	dec	hex
Unicode	10325	U+2855	10389	U+2895	10453	U+28D5
UTF-8	226 161 149	E2 A1 95	226 162 149	E2 A2 95	226 163 149	E2 A3 95
Numeric character reference	&#10325;	&#x2855;	&#10389;	&#x2895;	&#10453;	&#x28D5;

	dots 1357	dots 1358	dots 13578
Gardner Salinas Braille	O (capital)	ο (omicron)	〉 (close angle bracket)
Luxembourgish Braille	O (capital)		

== Related 8-dot kantenji patterns ==
In the Japanese kantenji braille, the standard 8-dot Braille patterns 267, 1267, 2467, and 12467 are the patterns related to Braille pattern dots-135, since the two additional dots of kantenji patterns 0135, 1357, and 01357 are placed above the base 6-dot cell, instead of below, as in standard 8-dot braille.

Character information
Preview	⡢ (braille pattern dots-267)		⡣ (braille pattern dots-1267)		⡪ (braille pattern dots-2467)		⡫ (braille pattern dots-12467)	
Unicode name	BRAILLE PATTERN DOTS-267		BRAILLE PATTERN DOTS-1267		BRAILLE PATTERN DOTS-2467		BRAILLE PATTERN DOTS-12467	
Encodings	decimal	hex	dec	hex	dec	hex	dec	hex
Unicode	10338	U+2862	10339	U+2863	10346	U+286A	10347	U+286B
UTF-8	226 161 162	E2 A1 A2	226 161 163	E2 A1 A3	226 161 170	E2 A1 AA	226 161 171	E2 A1 AB
Numeric character reference	&#10338;	&#x2862;	&#10339;	&#x2863;	&#10346;	&#x286A;	&#10347;	&#x286B;

=== Kantenji using braille patterns 267, 1267, 2467, or 12467 ===
This listing includes kantenji using Braille pattern dots-135 for all 6349 kanji found in JIS C 6226-1978.

- - ⽥

==== Variants and thematic compounds ====
- - た/⽥ + selector 1 = 谷
- - た/⽥ + selector 4 = 由
- - た/⽥ + selector 5 = 曲
- - 比 + た/⽥ = 尺

==== Compounds of ⽥ ====
- - ぬ/力 + た/⽥ = 勇
  - - に/氵 + ぬ/力 + た/⽥ = 湧
  - - み/耳 + ぬ/力 + た/⽥ = 踴
- - け/犬 + た/⽥ = 奮
- - み/耳 + た/⽥ = 戴
- - ふ/女 + た/⽥ = 画
- - 火 + た/⽥ = 畑
- - ら/月 + た/⽥ = 留
  - - 心 + ら/月 + た/⽥ = 榴
  - - に/氵 + ら/月 + た/⽥ = 溜
  - - へ/⺩ + ら/月 + た/⽥ = 瑠
  - - や/疒 + ら/月 + た/⽥ = 瘤
  - - ち/竹 + ら/月 + た/⽥ = 霤
- - 龸 + た/⽥ = 畜
- - 日 + た/⽥ = 畠
- - つ/土 + た/⽥ = 畦
- - の/禾 + た/⽥ = 番
  - - た/⽥ + む/車 = 翻
  - - の/禾 + た/⽥ + こ/子 = 糞
  - - し/巿 + の/禾 + た/⽥ = 幡
  - - て/扌 + の/禾 + た/⽥ = 播
  - - ほ/方 + の/禾 + た/⽥ = 旛
  - - に/氵 + の/禾 + た/⽥ = 潘
  - - 火 + の/禾 + た/⽥ = 燔
  - - い/糹/#2 + の/禾 + た/⽥ = 繙
  - - ⺼ + の/禾 + た/⽥ = 膰
  - - く/艹 + の/禾 + た/⽥ = 蕃
  - - む/車 + の/禾 + た/⽥ = 蟠
  - - か/金 + の/禾 + た/⽥ = 鐇
  - - た/⽥ + た/⽥ + む/車 = 飜
- - い/糹/#2 + た/⽥ = 細
  - - い/糹/#2 + た/⽥ + ゐ/幺 = 縲
- - く/艹 + た/⽥ = 蓄
- - さ/阝 + た/⽥ = 隈
- - ち/竹 + た/⽥ = 雷
  - - て/扌 + ち/竹 + た/⽥ = 擂
  - - く/艹 + ち/竹 + た/⽥ = 蕾
- - め/目 + た/⽥ = 鼻
  - - れ/口 + め/目 + た/⽥ = 嚊
  - - ふ/女 + め/目 + た/⽥ = 嬶
  - - か/金 + め/目 + た/⽥ = 鼾
- - た/⽥ + な/亻 = 佃
- - た/⽥ + つ/土 = 塁
- - た/⽥ + 心 = 思
  - - ⺼ + た/⽥ + 心 = 腮
  - - お/頁 + た/⽥ + 心 = 顋
  - - せ/食 + た/⽥ + 心 = 鰓
- - た/⽥ + き/木 = 果
  - - え/訁 + た/⽥ = 課
  - - た/⽥ + ほ/方 = 夥
  - - ね/示 + た/⽥ + き/木 = 裹
  - - み/耳 + た/⽥ + き/木 = 踝
  - - お/頁 + た/⽥ + き/木 = 顆
- - た/⽥ + 比 = 毘
- - た/⽥ + ぬ/力 = 男
  - - ふ/女 + た/⽥ + ぬ/力 = 嫐
  - - せ/食 + た/⽥ + ぬ/力 = 甥
  - - ぬ/力 + た/⽥ + ぬ/力 = 舅
  - - た/⽥ + 宿 + ふ/女 = 嬲
- - た/⽥ + て/扌 = 町
- - た/⽥ + 宿 = 界
  - - つ/土 + た/⽥ + 宿 = 堺
- - た/⽥ + ね/示 = 畏
  - - た/⽥ + け/犬 = 猥
  - - た/⽥ + ね/示 + selector 1 = 畩
- - た/⽥ + す/発 = 畝
- - た/⽥ + か/金 = 畢
  - - み/耳 + た/⽥ + か/金 = 蹕
- - た/⽥ + れ/口 = 略
  - - た/⽥ + た/⽥ + れ/口 = 畧
- - た/⽥ + こ/子 = 異
  - - き/木 + た/⽥ + こ/子 = 冀
- - た/⽥ + そ/馬 = 畳
  - - た/⽥ + た/⽥ + そ/馬 = 疊
- - た/⽥ + ゑ/訁 = 畷
- - た/⽥ + ち/竹 = 笛
- - た/⽥ + ゐ/幺 = 累
  - - や/疒 + た/⽥ + ゐ/幺 = 瘰
  - - む/車 + た/⽥ + ゐ/幺 = 螺
  - - そ/馬 + た/⽥ + ゐ/幺 = 騾
- - た/⽥ + ⺼ = 胃
  - - す/発 + た/⽥ = 膚
    - - す/発 + 宿 + た/⽥ = 盧
      - - 心 + た/⽥ = 蘆
      - - よ/广 + 宿 + た/⽥ = 廬
      - - 心 + 龸 + た/⽥ = 櫨
      - - に/氵 + 龸 + た/⽥ = 瀘
      - - ⺼ + 宿 + た/⽥ = 臚
      - - ふ/女 + 宿 + た/⽥ = 艫
      - - む/車 + 宿 + た/⽥ = 轤
      - - そ/馬 + 宿 + た/⽥ = 驢
      - - せ/食 + 宿 + た/⽥ = 鱸
  - - れ/口 + た/⽥ + ⺼ = 喟
  - - に/氵 + た/⽥ + ⺼ = 渭
  - - む/車 + た/⽥ + ⺼ = 蝟
- - た/⽥ + く/艹 = 苗
- - た/⽥ + さ/阝 = 卑
  - - へ/⺩ + た/⽥ = 牌
  - - ま/石 + た/⽥ = 碑
  - - ⺼ + た/⽥ = 脾
  - - お/頁 + た/⽥ = 顰
  - - た/⽥ + せ/食 = 鵯
  - - な/亻 + た/⽥ + さ/阝 = 俾
  - - ふ/女 + た/⽥ + さ/阝 = 婢
  - - や/疒 + た/⽥ + さ/阝 = 痺
  - - め/目 + た/⽥ + さ/阝 = 睥
  - - 心 + た/⽥ + さ/阝 = 稗
  - - ね/示 + た/⽥ + さ/阝 = 裨
  - - か/金 + た/⽥ + さ/阝 = 髀
- - に/氵 + 宿 + た/⽥ = 沺
- - 氷/氵 + ら/月 + た/⽥ = 澑
- - へ/⺩ + 宿 + た/⽥ = 璢
- - も/門 + 宿 + た/⽥ = 甸
- - た/⽥ + 数 + て/扌 = 甼
- - た/⽥ + 宿 + す/発 = 畆
- - た/⽥ + selector 3 + け/犬 = 畉
- - た/⽥ + selector 5 + い/糹/#2 = 畊
- - た/⽥ + 宿 + 氷/氵 = 畋
- - た/⽥ + 仁/亻 + 宿 = 畍
- - け/犬 + 宿 + た/⽥ = 畚
- - た/⽥ + 宿 + う/宀/#3 = 畛
- - た/⽥ + つ/土 + し/巿 = 畤
- - た/⽥ + り/分 + も/門 = 畭
- - た/⽥ + 宿 + へ/⺩ = 畴
- - た/⽥ + け/犬 + か/金 = 畸
- - た/⽥ + 宿 + そ/馬 = 疂
- - た/⽥ + へ/⺩ + し/巿 = 疇
- - ね/示 + 龸 + た/⽥ = 禝
- - ち/竹 + 宿 + た/⽥ = 篳
- - え/訁 + 宿 + た/⽥ = 謖
- - か/金 + 龸 + た/⽥ = 鈿
- - た/⽥ + 宿 + せ/食 = 鴫
- - ら/月 + ら/月 + た/⽥ = 畄
  - - い/糹/#2 + ら/月 + た/⽥ = 緇
  - - む/車 + ら/月 + た/⽥ = 輜
  - - か/金 + ら/月 + た/⽥ = 錙
  - - せ/食 + ら/月 + た/⽥ = 鯔
- - な/亻 + た/⽥ + た/⽥ = 儡
- - た/⽥ + た/⽥ + つ/土 = 壘
- - き/木 + た/⽥ + た/⽥ = 櫑
- - ん/止 + た/⽥ + た/⽥ = 罍
- - な/亻 + た/⽥ + た/⽥ = 儡
- - た/⽥ + 比 + ⺼ = 疉
- - ん/止 + た/⽥ + た/⽥ = 罍
- - な/亻 + 宿 + た/⽥ = 僵
- - ゆ/彳 + 宿 + た/⽥ = 彊
- - 心 + 宿 + た/⽥ = 橿
- - ゆ/彳 + 龸 + た/⽥ = 疆
- - ふ/女 + ふ/女 + た/⽥ = 畫
  - - ぬ/力 + ふ/女 + た/⽥ = 劃
  - - た/⽥ + た/⽥ + 日 = 晝

==== Compounds of 谷 ====
- - う/宀/#3 + た/⽥ = 容
  - - に/氵 + た/⽥ = 溶
  - - き/木 + う/宀/#3 + た/⽥ = 榕
  - - 火 + う/宀/#3 + た/⽥ = 熔
  - - の/禾 + う/宀/#3 + た/⽥ = 穃
  - - 心 + う/宀/#3 + た/⽥ = 蓉
  - - か/金 + う/宀/#3 + た/⽥ = 鎔
- - な/亻 + た/⽥ = 俗
- - 氷/氵 + た/⽥ = 浴
- - ね/示 + た/⽥ = 裕
- - 宿 + た/⽥ = 豁
- - た/⽥ + ん/止 = 欲
  - - る/忄 + た/⽥ + ん/止 = 慾
- - や/疒 + た/⽥ + selector 1 = 峪
- - ま/石 + た/⽥ + selector 1 = 硲
- - め/目 + た/⽥ + selector 1 = 谺
- - ゐ/幺 + た/⽥ + selector 1 = 谿
- - ひ/辶 + た/⽥ + selector 1 = 逧
- - さ/阝 + た/⽥ + selector 1 = 郤
- - つ/土 + た/⽥ + selector 1 = 壑
- - さ/阝 + 宿 + た/⽥ = 卻

==== Compounds of 由 ====
- - と/戸 + た/⽥ = 届
- - む/車 + た/⽥ = 軸
- - た/⽥ + 氷/氵 = 油
- - た/⽥ + ら/月 = 胄
- - た/⽥ + 囗 = 冑
- - や/疒 + た/⽥ + selector 4 = 岫
- - は/辶 + た/⽥ + selector 4 = 廸
- - 心 + た/⽥ + selector 4 = 柚
- - い/糹/#2 + た/⽥ + selector 4 = 紬
- - ふ/女 + た/⽥ + selector 4 = 舳
- - む/車 + た/⽥ + selector 4 = 蚰
- - ひ/辶 + た/⽥ + selector 4 = 迪
- - の/禾 + た/⽥ + selector 4 = 釉
- - そ/馬 + た/⽥ + selector 4 = 騁
- - み/耳 + 宿 + た/⽥ = 聘

==== Compounds of 曲 ====
- - た/⽥ + り/分 = 典
  - - き/木 + た/⽥ + り/分 = 椣
  - - ⺼ + た/⽥ + り/分 = 腆
- - た/⽥ + と/戸 = 豊
  - - た/⽥ + し/巿 = 艶
    - - た/⽥ + た/⽥ + し/巿 = 艷
  - - た/⽥ + た/⽥ + と/戸 = 豐
  - - み/耳 + た/⽥ + と/戸 = 軆
  - - せ/食 + た/⽥ + と/戸 = 鱧
  - - せ/食 + 龸 + た/⽥ = 醴
- - た/⽥ + ろ/十 = 農
  - - な/亻 + た/⽥ + ろ/十 = 儂
  - - ⺼ + た/⽥ + ろ/十 = 膿
- - と/戸 + た/⽥ + selector 5 = 髷

==== Compounds of 尺 ====
- - て/扌 + た/⽥ = 択
- - ゑ/訁 + た/⽥ = 訳
- - た/⽥ + の/禾 = 釈
- - そ/馬 + た/⽥ = 駅
- - た/⽥ + 日 = 昼
- - た/⽥ + に/氵 = 沢
- - れ/口 + 比 + た/⽥ = 呎
- - か/金 + 比 + た/⽥ = 鈬
- - た/⽥ + れ/口 + は/辶 = 咫

==== Compounds of 𦍒 ====
- - ひ/辶 + 宿 + た/⽥ = 逹
- - ひ/辶 + た/⽥ = 達
  - - て/扌 + ひ/辶 + た/⽥ = 撻
  - - 火 + ひ/辶 + た/⽥ = 燵
  - - も/門 + ひ/辶 + た/⽥ = 闥
  - - と/戸 + ひ/辶 + た/⽥ = 韃
- - ゐ/幺 + た/⽥ = 繹
- - た/⽥ + た/⽥ + に/氵 = 澤
- - た/⽥ + た/⽥ + の/禾 = 釋
- - る/忄 + 宿 + た/⽥ = 懌
- - て/扌 + て/扌 + た/⽥ = 擇
- - ゑ/訁 + ゑ/訁 + た/⽥ = 譯
- - か/金 + 宿 + た/⽥ = 鐸
- - そ/馬 + そ/馬 + た/⽥ = 驛

==== Other compounds ====
- - か/金 + た/⽥ = 拶
- - き/木 + た/⽥ = 楼
- - よ/广 + た/⽥ = 蛋
- - た/⽥ + い/糹/#2 = 対
- - せ/食 + た/⽥ = 鯛
- - ち/竹 + た/⽥ + ち/竹 = 籥
- - た/⽥ + た/⽥ + い/糹/#2 = 對
- - と/戸 + と/戸 + た/⽥ = 屆
- - て/扌 + 宿 + た/⽥ = 扣
- - き/木 + 宿 + た/⽥ = 樽
- - き/木 + き/木 + た/⽥ = 樓
