= Braille pattern dots-24 =

Braille pattern

6-dot braille cells
⠀	⠁	⠃	⠉	⠙	⠑	⠋	⠛	⠓	⠊	⠚	⠈	⠘
⠄	⠅	⠇	⠍	⠝	⠕	⠏	⠟	⠗	⠎	⠞	⠌	⠜
⠤	⠥	⠧	⠭	⠽	⠵	⠯	⠿	⠷	⠮	⠾	⠬	⠼
⠠	⠡	⠣	⠩	⠹	⠱	⠫	⠻	⠳	⠪	⠺	⠨	⠸
shift down	⠂	⠆	⠒	⠲	⠢	⠖	⠶	⠦	⠔	⠴	⠐	⠰

The Braille pattern dots-24 ( ⠊ ) is a 6-dot braille cell with the top right and middle left dots raised, or an 8-dot braille cell with the top right and upper-middle dots raised. It is represented by the Unicode code point U+280a, and in Braille ASCII with I.

Character information
Preview	⠊ (braille pattern dots-24)	
Unicode name	BRAILLE PATTERN DOTS-24	
Encodings	decimal	hex
Unicode	10250	U+280A
UTF-8	226 160 138	E2 A0 8A
Numeric character reference	&#10250;	&#x280A;
Braille ASCII	73	49

== Unified Braille ==
In unified international braille, the braille pattern dots-24 is used to represent unrounded, close or near-close, front vowel, such as /i/, /ɪ/, or /ɨ/. It is also used for the number 9.

=== Table of unified braille values ===
French Braille	I, "il"
English Braille	I
German Braille	I
Bharati Braille	इ / ਇ / ઇ / ই / ଇ / ఇ / ಇ / ഇ / இ / ඉ
Icelandic Braille	I
IPA Braille	/i/
Russian Braille	И
Slovak Braille	I
Arabic Braille	ي
Persian Braille	ى
Irish Braille	I
Thai Braille	โ◌ o
Luxembourgish Braille	i (minuscule)

== Other braille ==
Japanese Braille	o / お / オ
Korean Braille	d- / ㄷ
Mainland Chinese Braille	yi, -i
Taiwanese Braille	sh- / ㄕ
Two-Cell Chinese Braille	b- -è/-ò
Algerian Braille	ذ

== Plus dots 7 and 8 ==
Related to Braille pattern dots-24 are Braille patterns 247, 248, and 2478, which are used in 8-dot braille systems, such as Gardner-Salinas and Luxembourgish Braille.

Character information
Preview	⡊ (braille pattern dots-247)		⢊ (braille pattern dots-248)		⣊ (braille pattern dots-2478)	
Unicode name	BRAILLE PATTERN DOTS-247		BRAILLE PATTERN DOTS-248		BRAILLE PATTERN DOTS-2478	
Encodings	decimal	hex	dec	hex	dec	hex
Unicode	10314	U+284A	10378	U+288A	10442	U+28CA
UTF-8	226 161 138	E2 A1 8A	226 162 138	E2 A2 8A	226 163 138	E2 A3 8A
Numeric character reference	&#10314;	&#x284A;	&#10378;	&#x288A;	&#10442;	&#x28CA;

	dots 247	dots 248	dots 2478
Gardner Salinas Braille	I (capital)	ι (iota)	
Luxembourgish Braille	I (capital)		

== Related 8-dot kantenji patterns ==
In the Japanese kantenji braille, the standard 8-dot Braille patterns 35, 135, 345, and 1345 are the patterns related to Braille pattern dots-24, since the two additional dots of kantenji patterns 024, 247, and 0247 are placed above the base 6-dot cell, instead of below, as in standard 8-dot braille.

Character information
Preview	⠔ (braille pattern dots-35)		⠕ (braille pattern dots-135)		⠜ (braille pattern dots-345)		⠝ (braille pattern dots-1345)	
Unicode name	BRAILLE PATTERN DOTS-35		BRAILLE PATTERN DOTS-135		BRAILLE PATTERN DOTS-345		BRAILLE PATTERN DOTS-1345	
Encodings	decimal	hex	dec	hex	dec	hex	dec	hex
Unicode	10260	U+2814	10261	U+2815	10268	U+281C	10269	U+281D
UTF-8	226 160 148	E2 A0 94	226 160 149	E2 A0 95	226 160 156	E2 A0 9C	226 160 157	E2 A0 9D
Numeric character reference	&#10260;	&#x2814;	&#10261;	&#x2815;	&#10268;	&#x281C;	&#10269;	&#x281D;

=== Kantenji using braille patterns 35, 135, 345, or 1345 ===
This listing includes kantenji using Braille pattern dots-24 for all 6349 kanji found in JIS C 6226-1978.

- - 頁

==== Variants and thematic compounds ====
- - selector 1 + お/頁 = 丸
- - お/頁 + selector 1 = 君
- - お/頁 + selector 4 = 首
- - 数 + #9 = 九

==== Compounds of 頁 ====
- - な/亻 + お/頁 = 傾
- - 仁/亻 + お/頁 = 領
  - - や/疒 + お/頁 = 嶺
- - お/頁 + す/発 = 夏
  - - 心 + お/頁 = 榎
  - - よ/广 + お/頁 + す/発 = 厦
  - - れ/口 + お/頁 + す/発 = 嗄
  - - selector 1 + お/頁 + す/発 = 夐
    - - へ/⺩ + お/頁 + す/発 = 瓊
- - 火 + お/頁 = 煩
- - こ/子 + お/頁 = 項
- - 宿 + お/頁 = 頑
- - 囗 + お/頁 = 頷
- - ん/止 + お/頁 = 頻
  - - お/頁 + た/⽥ = 顰
  - - に/氵 + ん/止 + お/頁 = 瀕
  - - 心 + ん/止 + お/頁 = 蘋
- - れ/口 + お/頁 = 額
- - よ/广 + お/頁 = 願
- - め/目 + お/頁 = 顛
- - と/戸 + お/頁 = 顧
- - お/頁 + ま/石 = 碩
- - お/頁 + て/扌 = 頂
- - お/頁 + か/金 = 順
- - お/頁 + よ/广 = 預
  - - 心 + お/頁 + よ/广 = 蕷
- - お/頁 + り/分 = 頒
- - お/頁 + ふ/女 = 頓
  - - れ/口 + お/頁 + ふ/女 = 噸
- - お/頁 + ひ/辶 = 頗
- - お/頁 + け/犬 = 頚
- - お/頁 + な/亻 = 頬
- - お/頁 + と/戸 = 頭
- - お/頁 + 数 = 頼
  - - ふ/女 + お/頁 + 数 = 嬾
  - - る/忄 + お/頁 + 数 = 懶
  - - け/犬 + お/頁 + 数 = 獺
  - - や/疒 + お/頁 + 数 = 癩
  - - ち/竹 + お/頁 + 数 = 籟
  - - 心 + お/頁 + 数 = 藾
- - お/頁 + 龸 = 頽
- - お/頁 + 日 = 題
- - お/頁 + れ/口 = 顎
- - お/頁 + う/宀/#3 = 顔
  - - お/頁 + お/頁 + う/宀/#3 = 顏
- - お/頁 + ゐ/幺 = 顕
- - お/頁 + の/禾 = 類
- - お/頁 + 囗 = 賎
- - お/頁 + お/頁 + ゐ/幺 = 顯
- - お/頁 + お/頁 + と/戸 = 顱
- - れ/口 + 宿 + お/頁 = 囂
- - の/禾 + 宿 + お/頁 = 穎
- - お/頁 + selector 6 + こ/子 = 頌
- - お/頁 + 宿 + 宿 = 頏
- - お/頁 + つ/土 + れ/口 = 頡
- - お/頁 + 宿 + す/発 = 頤
- - ね/示 + 宿 + お/頁 = 頴
- - お/頁 + 龸 + け/犬 = 頸
- - お/頁 + た/⽥ + き/木 = 顆
- - お/頁 + た/⽥ + 心 = 顋
- - お/頁 + 囗 + れ/口 = 顫
- - お/頁 + 宿 + み/耳 = 顳
- - お/頁 + 宿 + け/犬 = 顴
- - や/疒 + お/頁 + て/扌 = 巓

==== Compounds of 丸 ====
- - つ/土 + お/頁 = 執
  - - を/貝 + お/頁 = 贄
  - - て/扌 + つ/土 + お/頁 = 摯
  - - む/車 + つ/土 + お/頁 = 蟄
- - こ/子 + 宿 + お/頁 = 孰
  - - お/頁 + 火 = 熟
  - - お/頁 + つ/土 = 塾
- - ち/竹 + selector 1 + お/頁 = 笂

==== Compounds of 君 ====
- - お/頁 + さ/阝 = 郡
- - お/頁 + そ/馬 = 群
- - 心 + お/頁 + selector 1 = 桾
- - う/宀/#3 + お/頁 + selector 1 = 窘
- - そ/馬 + お/頁 + selector 1 = 羣
- - ね/示 + お/頁 + selector 1 = 裙

==== Compounds of 首 ====
- - 囗 + お/頁 + selector 4 = 馘

==== Compounds of 九 ====
- - お/頁 + 仁/亻 = 仇
- - む/車 + お/頁 = 軌
- - お/頁 + せ/食 = 鳩
- - う/宀/#3 + お/頁 = 究
- - ま/石 + お/頁 = 砕
- - お/頁 + お/頁 + ろ/十 = 卆
  - - 仁/亻 + お/頁 + ろ/十 = 伜
  - - る/忄 + 宿 + お/頁 = 忰
  - - む/車 + 宿 + お/頁 = 翆
- - 日 + 数 + お/頁 = 旭
- - ひ/辶 + 数 + お/頁 = 馗

==== Other compounds ====
- - 龸 + お/頁 = 乞
  - - れ/口 + 龸 + お/頁 = 吃
  - - や/疒 + 龸 + お/頁 = 屹
  - - え/訁 + 龸 + お/頁 = 訖
- - ふ/女 + お/頁 = 嫡
- - て/扌 + お/頁 = 摘
- - に/氵 + お/頁 = 滴
- - お/頁 + 氷/氵 = 敵
- - ひ/辶 + お/頁 = 適
- - え/訁 + 宿 + お/頁 = 謫
- - か/金 + 宿 + お/頁 = 鏑
- - り/分 + お/頁 = 倉
  - - お/頁 + ぬ/力 = 創
  - - る/忄 + り/分 + お/頁 = 愴
  - - て/扌 + り/分 + お/頁 = 搶
  - - き/木 + り/分 + お/頁 = 槍
  - - に/氵 + り/分 + お/頁 = 滄
  - - や/疒 + り/分 + お/頁 = 瘡
  - - ふ/女 + り/分 + お/頁 = 艙
  - - く/艹 + り/分 + お/頁 = 蒼
  - - み/耳 + り/分 + お/頁 = 蹌
  - - か/金 + り/分 + お/頁 = 鎗
- - け/犬 + お/頁 = 央
  - - る/忄 + お/頁 = 怏
  - - 日 + お/頁 = 映
  - - く/艹 + お/頁 = 英
    - - 日 + く/艹 + お/頁 = 暎
    - - へ/⺩ + く/艹 + お/頁 = 瑛
    - - ち/竹 + く/艹 + お/頁 = 霙
  - - ほ/方 + け/犬 + お/頁 = 殃
  - - に/氵 + け/犬 + お/頁 = 泱
  - - の/禾 + け/犬 + お/頁 = 秧
  - - と/戸 + け/犬 + お/頁 = 鞅
  - - お/頁 + 宿 + せ/食 = 鴦
- - ち/竹 + お/頁 = 斧
- - き/木 + お/頁 = 析
  - - に/氵 + き/木 + お/頁 = 淅
  - - 日 + き/木 + お/頁 = 皙
  - - む/車 + き/木 + お/頁 = 蜥
  - - 日 + 宿 + お/頁 = 晰
- - か/金 + お/頁 = 瓩
- - の/禾 + お/頁 = 粁
- - 氷/氵 + お/頁 = 漬
- - ぬ/力 + お/頁 = 負
- - ろ/十 + お/頁 = 賑
- - お/頁 + ん/止 = 賦
- - に/氵 + お/頁 + 囗 = 濺
- - お/頁 + ろ/十 = 卒
  - - ⺼ + お/頁 = 膵
  - - な/亻 + お/頁 + ろ/十 = 倅
  - - つ/土 + お/頁 + ろ/十 = 埣
  - - る/忄 + お/頁 + ろ/十 = 悴
  - - に/氵 + お/頁 + ろ/十 = 淬
  - - け/犬 + お/頁 + ろ/十 = 猝
  - - や/疒 + お/頁 + ろ/十 = 瘁
  - - む/車 + お/頁 + ろ/十 = 翠
  - - く/艹 + お/頁 + ろ/十 = 萃
  - - ま/石 + ま/石 + お/頁 = 碎
- - お/頁 + に/氵 = 鬼
  - - お/頁 + ゑ/訁 = 魃
  - - お/頁 + き/木 = 魅
  - - せ/食 + お/頁 = 醜
  - - な/亻 + お/頁 + に/氵 = 傀
  - - や/疒 + お/頁 + に/氵 = 嵬
  - - る/忄 + お/頁 + に/氵 = 愧
  - - 心 + お/頁 + に/氵 = 槐
  - - へ/⺩ + お/頁 + に/氵 = 瑰
  - - く/艹 + お/頁 + に/氵 = 蒐
  - - さ/阝 + お/頁 + に/氵 = 隗
  - - せ/食 + お/頁 + に/氵 = 餽
  - - 日 + お/頁 + に/氵 = 魄
  - - の/禾 + お/頁 + に/氵 = 魏
    - - や/疒 + う/宀/#3 + お/頁 = 巍
  - - よ/广 + お/頁 + に/氵 = 魘
  - - お/頁 + 宿 + と/戸 = 魁
  - - お/頁 + 宿 + ゆ/彳 = 魍
  - - お/頁 + ち/竹 + selector 4 = 魎
  - - お/頁 + selector 4 + い/糹/#2 = 魑
- - お/頁 + 宿 + 囗 = 戛
  - - お/頁 + 龸 + 囗 = 戞
- - そ/馬 + 宿 + お/頁 = 牡
- - お/頁 + し/巿 + か/金 = 赧
