= Braille pattern dots-2345 =

Braille pattern

6-dot braille cells
⠀	⠁	⠃	⠉	⠙	⠑	⠋	⠛	⠓	⠊	⠚	⠈	⠘
⠄	⠅	⠇	⠍	⠝	⠕	⠏	⠟	⠗	⠎	⠞	⠌	⠜
⠤	⠥	⠧	⠭	⠽	⠵	⠯	⠿	⠷	⠮	⠾	⠬	⠼
⠠	⠡	⠣	⠩	⠹	⠱	⠫	⠻	⠳	⠪	⠺	⠨	⠸
shift down	⠂	⠆	⠒	⠲	⠢	⠖	⠶	⠦	⠔	⠴	⠐	⠰

The Braille pattern dots-2345 ( ⠞ ) is a 6-dot braille cell with the top right, both middle, and bottom left dots raised, or an 8-dot braille cell with the top right, both upper-middle, and the lower-middle left dots raised. It is represented by the Unicode code point U+281e, and in Braille ASCII with T.

Character information
Preview	⠞ (braille pattern dots-2345)	
Unicode name	BRAILLE PATTERN DOTS-2345	
Encodings	decimal	hex
Unicode	10270	U+281E
UTF-8	226 160 158	E2 A0 9E
Numeric character reference	&#10270;	&#x281E;
Braille ASCII	84	54

== Unified Braille ==
In unified international braille, the braille pattern dots-2345 is used to represent an unvoiced dental or alveolar plosive, such as /t/ or /t̪/, and otherwise as needed.

=== Table of unified braille values ===
French Braille	T, "te"
English Braille	T
English Contraction	that
German Braille	T
Bharati Braille	त / ਤ / ત / ত / ତ / త / ತ / ത / த / ත / ت
Icelandic Braille	T
IPA Braille	/t/
Russian Braille	Т
Slovak Braille	T
Arabic Braille	ت
Persian Braille	ت
Irish Braille	T
Thai Braille	ถ th
Luxembourgish Braille	t (minuscule)

== Other braille ==
Japanese Braille	to / と / ト
Korean Braille	eol / 얼
Mainland Chinese Braille	t
Taiwanese Braille	yan, -ian / ㄧㄢ
Two-Cell Chinese Braille	ti- -ā, 他 tā
Nemeth Braille	not an independent sign
Algerian Braille	ف

== Plus dots 7 and 8 ==
Related to Braille pattern dots-2345 are Braille patterns 23457, 23458, and 234578, which are used in 8-dot braille systems, such as Gardner–Salinas and Luxembourgish Braille.

Character information
Preview	⡞ (braille pattern dots-23457)		⢞ (braille pattern dots-23458)		⣞ (braille pattern dots-234578)	
Unicode name	BRAILLE PATTERN DOTS-23457		BRAILLE PATTERN DOTS-23458		BRAILLE PATTERN DOTS-234578	
Encodings	decimal	hex	dec	hex	dec	hex
Unicode	10334	U+285E	10398	U+289E	10462	U+28DE
UTF-8	226 161 158	E2 A1 9E	226 162 158	E2 A2 9E	226 163 158	E2 A3 9E
Numeric character reference	&#10334;	&#x285E;	&#10398;	&#x289E;	&#10462;	&#x28DE;

	dots 23457	dots 23458	dots 234578
Gardner Salinas Braille	T (capital)	τ (tau)	
Luxembourgish Braille	T (capital)		

== Related 8-dot kantenji patterns ==
In the Japanese kantenji braille, the standard 8-dot Braille patterns 3567, 13567, 34567, and 134567 are the patterns related to Braille pattern dots-2345, since the two additional dots of kantenji patterns 02345, 23457, and 023457 are placed above the base 6-dot cell, instead of below, as in standard 8-dot braille.

Character information
Preview	⡴ (braille pattern dots-3567)		⡵ (braille pattern dots-13567)		⡼ (braille pattern dots-34567)		⡽ (braille pattern dots-134567)	
Unicode name	BRAILLE PATTERN DOTS-3567		BRAILLE PATTERN DOTS-13567		BRAILLE PATTERN DOTS-34567		BRAILLE PATTERN DOTS-134567	
Encodings	decimal	hex	dec	hex	dec	hex	dec	hex
Unicode	10356	U+2874	10357	U+2875	10364	U+287C	10365	U+287D
UTF-8	226 161 180	E2 A1 B4	226 161 181	E2 A1 B5	226 161 188	E2 A1 BC	226 161 189	E2 A1 BD
Numeric character reference	&#10356;	&#x2874;	&#10357;	&#x2875;	&#10364;	&#x287C;	&#10365;	&#x287D;

=== Kantenji using braille patterns 3567, 13567, 34567, or 134567 ===
This listing includes kantenji using Braille pattern dots-2345 for all 6349 kanji found in JIS C 6226-1978.

- - 戸

==== Variants and thematic compounds ====
- - selector 1 + と/戸 = 髟
- - selector 2 + と/戸 = 卜
- - selector 3 + と/戸 = 并
- - selector 4 + と/戸 = 長
- - selector 5 + と/戸 = 豆
- - selector 6 + と/戸 = 廾
- - と/戸 + selector 1 = 居
- - と/戸 + selector 2 = 老
- - と/戸 + selector 5 = 考
- - と/戸 + selector 6 = 尸
- - 数 + と/戸 = 廿
- - 比 + と/戸 = 斗

==== Compounds of 戸 ====
- - と/戸 + れ/口 = 啓
- - と/戸 + け/犬 = 戻
  - - れ/口 + と/戸 + け/犬 = 唳
  - - て/扌 + と/戸 + け/犬 = 捩
  - - い/糹/#2 + と/戸 + け/犬 = 綟
- - と/戸 + ほ/方 = 房
- - と/戸 + を/貝 = 所
- - と/戸 + む/車 = 扇
  - - 火 + と/戸 + む/車 = 煽
- - と/戸 + 火 = 炉
- - と/戸 + ⺼ = 肩
- - と/戸 + い/糹/#2 = 雇
  - - と/戸 + お/頁 = 顧
- - い/糹/#2 + と/戸 + れ/口 = 綮
- - ふ/女 + と/戸 + れ/口 = 肇
- - と/戸 + 宿 + へ/⺩ = 扁
- - と/戸 + 囗 + ひ/辶 = 扈
- - と/戸 + selector 4 + 火 = 扉
- - き/木 + 龸 + と/戸 = 枦
- - の/禾 + 龸 + と/戸 = 粐
- - ふ/女 + 宿 + と/戸 = 舮
- - 心 + 宿 + と/戸 = 芦
- - か/金 + 宿 + と/戸 = 鈩

==== Compounds of 髟 ====
- - と/戸 + う/宀/#3 = 髪
  - - と/戸 + と/戸 + う/宀/#3 = 髮
  - - と/戸 + う/宀/#3 + ま/石 = 鬘
- - と/戸 + 宿 = 髯
- - と/戸 + 龸 = 鬢
- - せ/食 + と/戸 + う/宀/#3 = 髦
- - も/門 + と/戸 + う/宀/#3 = 髱
- - と/戸 + selector 4 + ち/竹 = 髢
- - と/戸 + 宿 + ほ/方 = 髣
- - と/戸 + ぬ/力 + 囗 = 髫
- - と/戸 + 宿 + れ/口 = 髭
- - と/戸 + selector 6 + め/目 = 髴
- - と/戸 + た/⽥ + selector 5 = 髷
- - と/戸 + つ/土 + れ/口 = 髻
- - と/戸 + 心 + こ/子 = 鬆
- - と/戸 + う/宀/#3 + す/発 = 鬚
- - と/戸 + う/宀/#3 + る/忄 = 鬟
- - と/戸 + け/犬 + selector 5 = 鬣

==== Compounds of 卜 ====
- - 日 + と/戸 = 卓
  - - る/忄 + と/戸 = 悼
  - - な/亻 + 日 + と/戸 = 倬
  - - れ/口 + 日 + と/戸 = 啅
  - - て/扌 + 日 + と/戸 = 掉
  - - き/木 + 日 + と/戸 = 棹
  - - い/糹/#2 + 日 + と/戸 = 綽
  - - す/発 + 日 + と/戸 = 罩
- - れ/口 + と/戸 = 占
  - - や/疒 + れ/口 + と/戸 = 岾
  - - て/扌 + れ/口 + と/戸 = 拈
  - - に/氵 + れ/口 + と/戸 = 沾
  - - ま/石 + れ/口 + と/戸 = 砧
  - - ち/竹 + れ/口 + と/戸 = 笘
  - - く/艹 + れ/口 + と/戸 = 苫
  - - せ/食 + れ/口 + と/戸 = 鮎
  - - の/禾 + れ/口 + と/戸 = 黏
- - ほ/方 + と/戸 = 外
  - - ひ/辶 + ほ/方 + と/戸 = 迯
- - を/貝 + と/戸 = 貞
  - - 仁/亻 + と/戸 = 偵
  - - し/巿 + を/貝 + と/戸 = 幀
  - - ま/石 + を/貝 + と/戸 = 碵
  - - ね/示 + を/貝 + と/戸 = 禎
  - - ひ/辶 + を/貝 + と/戸 = 遉
- - え/訁 + と/戸 = 訃
- - は/辶 + と/戸 = 赴
- - な/亻 + 宿 + と/戸 = 仆
- - つ/土 + 宿 + と/戸 = 卦
- - き/木 + 宿 + と/戸 = 朴
- - し/巿 + 宿 + と/戸 = 帖
- - ま/石 + 宿 + と/戸 = 站

==== Compounds of 并 ====
- - な/亻 + と/戸 = 併
- - い/糹/#2 + と/戸 = 絣
- - せ/食 + と/戸 = 餅
- - と/戸 + か/金 = 瓶
- - と/戸 + 宿 + と/戸 = 屏
- - と/戸 + う/宀/#3 + ぬ/力 = 剏
- - つ/土 + 龸 + と/戸 = 垪
- - ⺼ + 宿 + と/戸 = 胼
- - ひ/辶 + 宿 + と/戸 = 迸
- - せ/食 + せ/食 + と/戸 = 餠
- - そ/馬 + 龸 + と/戸 = 駢

==== Compounds of 長 ====
- - ゆ/彳 + と/戸 = 張
  - - に/氵 + ゆ/彳 + と/戸 = 漲
- - し/巿 + と/戸 = 帳
- - ら/月 + と/戸 = 脹
- - る/忄 + selector 4 + と/戸 = 悵
- - 心 + selector 4 + と/戸 = 萇
- - け/犬 + 宿 + と/戸 = 套
- - と/戸 + 宿 + ふ/女 = 肆

==== Compounds of 豆 ====
- - す/発 + と/戸 = 登
  - - に/氵 + と/戸 = 澄
  - - 火 + と/戸 = 燈
  - - や/疒 + す/発 + と/戸 = 嶝
  - - 心 + す/発 + と/戸 = 橙
  - - ま/石 + す/発 + と/戸 = 磴
  - - か/金 + す/発 + と/戸 = 鐙
- - や/疒 + と/戸 = 痘
- - た/⽥ + と/戸 = 豊
  - - た/⽥ + た/⽥ + と/戸 = 豐
  - - み/耳 + た/⽥ + と/戸 = 軆
  - - せ/食 + た/⽥ + と/戸 = 鱧
- - お/頁 + と/戸 = 頭
- - と/戸 + や/疒 = 短
- - と/戸 + は/辶 = 鼓
  - - と/戸 + と/戸 + は/辶 = 皷
- - よ/广 + selector 5 + と/戸 = 厨
- - 心 + selector 5 + と/戸 = 荳
- - う/宀/#3 + selector 5 + と/戸 = 豌
- - ひ/辶 + selector 5 + と/戸 = 逗
- - よ/广 + 宿 + と/戸 = 廚
- - と/戸 + す/発 + selector 1 = 鼕
- - と/戸 + 宿 + す/発 = 豎

==== Compounds of 廾 ====
- - け/犬 + と/戸 = 奔
  - - く/艹 + け/犬 + と/戸 = 莽
    - - む/車 + け/犬 + と/戸 = 蠎
- - む/車 + と/戸 = 弁
  - - や/疒 + む/車 + と/戸 = 峅
- - へ/⺩ + と/戸 = 弄
  - - れ/口 + へ/⺩ + と/戸 = 哢
- - 氷/氵 + と/戸 = 弊
- - と/戸 + 囗 = 戒
  - - え/訁 + と/戸 + 囗 = 誡
  - - き/木 + と/戸 = 械
- - め/目 + と/戸 = 算
- - く/艹 + と/戸 = 葬
- - も/門 + と/戸 = 開
- - と/戸 + へ/⺩ + つ/土 = 弉
- - と/戸 + り/分 + の/禾 = 彜
- - と/戸 + 龸 + の/禾 = 彝
- - ち/竹 + 宿 + と/戸 = 笄
- - ぬ/力 + 宿 + と/戸 = 舁
- - む/車 + 宿 + と/戸 = 蟒

==== Compounds of 居 ====
- - な/亻 + と/戸 + selector 1 = 倨
- - て/扌 + と/戸 + selector 1 = 据
- - ね/示 + と/戸 + selector 1 = 裾
- - み/耳 + と/戸 + selector 1 = 踞
- - か/金 + と/戸 + selector 1 = 鋸

==== Compounds of 老 ====
- - ふ/女 + と/戸 = 姥
- - れ/口 + と/戸 + selector 2 = 咾
- - 心 + と/戸 + selector 2 = 蓍
- - む/車 + と/戸 + selector 2 = 蛯
- - と/戸 + 日 = 者
  - - と/戸 + ち/竹 = 箸
  - - と/戸 + く/艹 = 著
    - - つ/土 + と/戸 + く/艹 = 墸
    - - み/耳 + と/戸 + く/艹 = 躇
  - - な/亻 + と/戸 + 日 = 偖
  - - け/犬 + と/戸 + 日 = 奢
  - - 心 + と/戸 + 日 = 楮
  - - に/氵 + と/戸 + 日 = 渚
  - - 氷/氵 + と/戸 + 日 = 瀦
  - - め/目 + と/戸 + 日 = 睹
  - - か/金 + と/戸 + 日 = 赭
  - - も/門 + と/戸 + 日 = 闍
- - と/戸 + こ/子 = 孝
  - - と/戸 + 氷/氵 = 教
  - - れ/口 + と/戸 + こ/子 = 哮
- - と/戸 + selector 4 + せ/食 = 耄
- - と/戸 + selector 4 + に/氵 = 耆
- - と/戸 + selector 4 + ゆ/彳 = 耋
- - と/戸 + め/目 + 宿 = 覩
- - せ/食 + 宿 + と/戸 = 鰭

==== Compounds of 考 ====
- - と/戸 + て/扌 = 拷
- - き/木 + と/戸 + selector 5 = 栲

==== Compounds of 尸 ====
- - と/戸 + へ/⺩ = 屈
  - - つ/土 + と/戸 = 堀
  - - て/扌 + と/戸 = 掘
  - - な/亻 + と/戸 + へ/⺩ = 倔
  - - や/疒 + と/戸 + へ/⺩ = 崛
  - - う/宀/#3 + と/戸 + へ/⺩ = 窟
- - と/戸 + と/戸 = 展
  - - ま/石 + と/戸 + と/戸 = 碾
  - - む/車 + と/戸 + と/戸 = 輾
- - ひ/辶 + と/戸 = 遅
- - と/戸 + ね/示 = 尉
  - - と/戸 + 心 = 慰
  - - 火 + と/戸 + ね/示 = 熨
  - - く/艹 + と/戸 + ね/示 = 蔚
- - そ/馬 + と/戸 = 屑
- - と/戸 + 数 = 尻
- - と/戸 + 仁/亻 = 尼
  - - る/忄 + と/戸 + 仁/亻 = 怩
  - - 日 + と/戸 + 仁/亻 = 昵
  - - め/目 + と/戸 + 仁/亻 = 眤
- - と/戸 + せ/食 = 尾
  - - き/木 + と/戸 + せ/食 = 梶
- - と/戸 + に/氵 = 尿
- - と/戸 + も/門 = 局
  - - み/耳 + と/戸 + も/門 = 跼
- - と/戸 + 比 = 屁
- - と/戸 + た/⽥ = 届
  - - と/戸 + と/戸 + た/⽥ = 屆
- - と/戸 + ゆ/彳 = 屋
  - - し/巿 + と/戸 + ゆ/彳 = 幄
  - - に/氵 + と/戸 + ゆ/彳 = 渥
  - - ん/止 + と/戸 + ゆ/彳 = 齷
- - と/戸 + し/巿 = 屍
- - と/戸 + み/耳 = 属
  - - と/戸 + と/戸 + み/耳 = 屬
    - - め/目 + と/戸 + み/耳 = 矚
- - と/戸 + る/忄 = 屡
- - と/戸 + そ/馬 = 層
- - と/戸 + す/発 = 履
- - と/戸 + 宿 + こ/子 = 孱
- - と/戸 + の/禾 + selector 1 = 屎
- - と/戸 + 宿 + と/戸 = 屏
- - と/戸 + 宿 + は/辶 = 屐
- - と/戸 + 宿 + を/貝 = 屓
- - そ/馬 + 宿 + と/戸 = 犀
- - の/禾 + 宿 + と/戸 = 穉
- - ひ/辶 + ひ/辶 + と/戸 = 遲

==== Compounds of 廿 ====
- - よ/广 + と/戸 = 庶
  - - 心 + よ/广 + と/戸 = 蔗
  - - み/耳 + よ/广 + と/戸 = 蹠
- - と/戸 + ろ/十 = 革
  - - と/戸 + ぬ/力 = 靱
  - - と/戸 + ふ/女 = 鞍
  - - と/戸 + ら/月 = 覇
  - - 龸 + と/戸 + ろ/十 = 鞏
  - - え/訁 + と/戸 + ろ/十 = 鞫
- - と/戸 + 宿 + ぬ/力 = 勒
- - と/戸 + selector 1 + ゑ/訁 = 靫
- - と/戸 + selector 1 + ぬ/力 = 靭
- - と/戸 + 仁/亻 + 比 = 靴
- - と/戸 + 囗 + 仁/亻 = 靹
- - と/戸 + き/木 + selector 5 = 靺
- - と/戸 + selector 4 + 日 = 靼
- - と/戸 + selector 4 + ひ/辶 = 鞁
- - と/戸 + も/門 + selector 2 = 鞄
- - と/戸 + け/犬 + お/頁 = 鞅
- - と/戸 + 数 + へ/⺩ = 鞆
- - と/戸 + う/宀/#3 + 龸 = 鞐
- - と/戸 + そ/馬 + ⺼ = 鞘
- - と/戸 + み/耳 + に/氵 = 鞜
- - と/戸 + 心 + selector 2 = 鞠
- - と/戸 + き/木 + よ/广 = 鞣
- - と/戸 + の/禾 + 火 = 鞦
- - と/戸 + 宿 + 氷/氵 = 鞨
- - と/戸 + 仁/亻 + な/亻 = 鞭
- - と/戸 + り/分 + 囗 = 鞳
- - と/戸 + 宿 + ひ/辶 = 鞴
- - と/戸 + ひ/辶 + た/⽥ = 韃
- - と/戸 + は/辶 + さ/阝 = 韆
- - と/戸 + す/発 + ひ/辶 = 韈
- - と/戸 + 龸 + せ/食 = 鷓

==== Compounds of 斗 ====
- - り/分 + と/戸 = 斜
- - ろ/十 + と/戸 = 斡
- - の/禾 + と/戸 = 科
  - - 心 + の/禾 + と/戸 = 萪
  - - む/車 + の/禾 + と/戸 = 蝌
- - と/戸 + の/禾 = 料
- - て/扌 + 比 + と/戸 = 抖
- - 囗 + 比 + と/戸 = 斛
- - も/門 + 比 + と/戸 = 斟
- - む/車 + 比 + と/戸 = 蚪
- - お/頁 + 宿 + と/戸 = 魁

==== Other compounds ====
- - こ/子 + と/戸 = 事
  - - こ/子 + こ/子 + と/戸 = 亊
- - さ/阝 + と/戸 = 陶
- - ね/示 + と/戸 = 礼
  - - ね/示 + ね/示 + と/戸 = 禮
- - 囗 + と/戸 = 同
  - - 心 + と/戸 = 桐
  - - ち/竹 + と/戸 = 筒
  - - ⺼ + と/戸 = 胴
  - - か/金 + と/戸 = 銅
  - - る/忄 + 囗 + と/戸 = 恫
  - - に/氵 + 囗 + と/戸 = 洞
  - - の/禾 + 囗 + と/戸 = 粡
- - ぬ/力 + と/戸 + 宿 = 剳
- - て/扌 + と/戸 + 宿 = 搭
- - と/戸 + と/戸 + 火 = 爐
- - お/頁 + お/頁 + と/戸 = 顱
- - と/戸 + 宿 + 仁/亻 = 丱
- - て/扌 + 宿 + と/戸 = 掏
- - に/氵 + 宿 + と/戸 = 淘
- - い/糹/#2 + 宿 + と/戸 = 綯
- - 心 + 龸 + と/戸 = 萄
- - selector 4 + む/車 + と/戸 = 辧
- - む/車 + む/車 + と/戸 = 辨
- - む/車 + 龸 + と/戸 = 辯
- - と/戸 + 宿 + せ/食 = 鳶
