= Braille pattern dots-1345 =

Braille pattern

6-dot braille cells
⠀	⠁	⠃	⠉	⠙	⠑	⠋	⠛	⠓	⠊	⠚	⠈	⠘
⠄	⠅	⠇	⠍	⠝	⠕	⠏	⠟	⠗	⠎	⠞	⠌	⠜
⠤	⠥	⠧	⠭	⠽	⠵	⠯	⠿	⠷	⠮	⠾	⠬	⠼
⠠	⠡	⠣	⠩	⠹	⠱	⠫	⠻	⠳	⠪	⠺	⠨	⠸
shift down	⠂	⠆	⠒	⠲	⠢	⠖	⠶	⠦	⠔	⠴	⠐	⠰

The Braille pattern dots-1345 ( ⠝ ) is a 6-dot braille cell with both top, the middle right, and bottom left dots raised, or an 8-dot braille cell with both top, the upper-middle right, and lower-middle left dots raised. It is represented by the Unicode code point U+281d, and in Braille ASCII with N.

Character information
Preview	⠝ (braille pattern dots-1345)	
Unicode name	BRAILLE PATTERN DOTS-1345	
Encodings	decimal	hex
Unicode	10269	U+281D
UTF-8	226 160 157	E2 A0 9D
Numeric character reference	&#10269;	&#x281D;
Braille ASCII	78	4E

== Unified Braille ==
In unified international braille, the braille pattern dots-1345 is used to represent the alveolar nasal, i.e. /n/, and otherwise as needed.

=== Table of unified braille values ===
French Braille	N, "ne"
English Braille	N
English Contraction	not
German Braille	N
Bharati Braille	न / ਨ / ન / ন / ନ / న / ನ / ന / ந / න / ن
Icelandic Braille	N
IPA Braille	/n/
Russian Braille	Н
Slovak Braille	N
Arabic Braille	ن
Persian Braille	ن
Irish Braille	N
Thai Braille	น n
Luxembourgish Braille	n (minuscule)

== Other braille ==
Japanese Braille	tsu / つ / ツ
Korean Braille	e / ㅔ
Mainland Chinese Braille	n
Taiwanese Braille	n / ㄋ
Two-Cell Chinese Braille	c- -āng
Nemeth Braille	not an independent sign
Algerian Braille	ص

== Plus dots 7 and 8 ==
Related to Braille pattern dots-1345 are Braille patterns 13457, 13458, and 134578, which are used in 8-dot braille systems, such as Gardner-Salinas and Luxembourgish Braille.

Character information
Preview	⡝ (braille pattern dots-13457)		⢝ (braille pattern dots-13458)		⣝ (braille pattern dots-134578)	
Unicode name	BRAILLE PATTERN DOTS-13457		BRAILLE PATTERN DOTS-13458		BRAILLE PATTERN DOTS-134578	
Encodings	decimal	hex	dec	hex	dec	hex
Unicode	10333	U+285D	10397	U+289D	10461	U+28DD
UTF-8	226 161 157	E2 A1 9D	226 162 157	E2 A2 9D	226 163 157	E2 A3 9D
Numeric character reference	&#10333;	&#x285D;	&#10397;	&#x289D;	&#10461;	&#x28DD;

	dots 13457	dots 13458	dots 134578
Gardner Salinas Braille	N (capital)	ν (nu)	
Luxembourgish Braille	N (capital)		

== Related 8-dot kantenji patterns ==
In the Japanese kantenji braille, the standard 8-dot Braille patterns 2567, 12567, 24567, and 124567 are the patterns related to Braille pattern dots-1345, since the two additional dots of kantenji patterns 01345, 13457, and 013457 are placed above the base 6-dot cell, instead of below, as in standard 8-dot braille.

Character information
Preview	⡲ (braille pattern dots-2567)		⡳ (braille pattern dots-12567)		⡺ (braille pattern dots-24567)		⡻ (braille pattern dots-124567)	
Unicode name	BRAILLE PATTERN DOTS-2567		BRAILLE PATTERN DOTS-12567		BRAILLE PATTERN DOTS-24567		BRAILLE PATTERN DOTS-124567	
Encodings	decimal	hex	dec	hex	dec	hex	dec	hex
Unicode	10354	U+2872	10355	U+2873	10362	U+287A	10363	U+287B
UTF-8	226 161 178	E2 A1 B2	226 161 179	E2 A1 B3	226 161 186	E2 A1 BA	226 161 187	E2 A1 BB
Numeric character reference	&#10354;	&#x2872;	&#10355;	&#x2873;	&#10362;	&#x287A;	&#10363;	&#x287B;

=== Kantenji using braille patterns 2567, 12567, 24567, or 124567 ===
This listing includes kantenji using Braille pattern dots-1345 for all 6349 kanji found in JIS C 6226-1978.

- - 土

==== Variants and thematic compounds ====
- - selector 4 + つ/土 = 庄
  - - selector 4 + selector 4 + つ/土 = 甬
- - selector 6 + つ/土 = 尭
- - つ/土 + selector 1 = 士
- - つ/土 + selector 4 = 域
- - 比 + つ/土 = 貫
- - つ/土 + を/貝 = 売
  - - つ/土 + つ/土 + を/貝 = 賣

==== Compounds of 土 ====
- - selector 1 + つ/土 = 堊
- - 仁/亻 + つ/土 = 佳
- - れ/口 + つ/土 = 吐
  - - れ/口 + つ/土 + つ/土 = 哇
- - 囗 + つ/土 = 周
  - - ゑ/訁 + つ/土 = 調
  - - ひ/辶 + つ/土 = 週
  - - 氷/氵 + 囗 + つ/土 = 凋
  - - る/忄 + 囗 + つ/土 = 惆
  - - の/禾 + 囗 + つ/土 = 稠
  - - い/糹/#2 + 囗 + つ/土 = 綢
  - - む/車 + 囗 + つ/土 = 蜩
- - よ/广 + つ/土 = 圧
- - ろ/十 + つ/土 = 在
  - - る/忄 + ろ/十 + つ/土 = 恠
- - ん/止 + つ/土 = 址
- - り/分 + つ/土 = 坪
- - ぬ/力 + つ/土 = 型
- - き/木 + つ/土 = 基
- - 龸 + つ/土 = 堂
  - - め/目 + 龸 + つ/土 = 瞠
  - - む/車 + 龸 + つ/土 = 螳
- - た/⽥ + つ/土 = 塁
- - に/氵 + つ/土 = 塗
- - う/宀/#3 + つ/土 = 塞
- - お/頁 + つ/土 = 塾
- - く/艹 + つ/土 = 墓
- - そ/馬 + つ/土 = 墜
- - し/巿 + つ/土 = 墨
- - ま/石 + つ/土 = 壁
- - つ/土 + つ/土 = 封
  - - し/巿 + つ/土 + つ/土 = 幇
- - て/扌 + つ/土 = 掛
- - 氷/氵 + つ/土 = 涯
- - ね/示 + つ/土 = 社
  - - ね/示 + つ/土 + つ/土 = 褂
  - - ね/示 + つ/土 + れ/口 = 襭
- - む/車 + つ/土 = 蛙
- - ゆ/彳 + つ/土 = 街
- - も/門 + つ/土 = 閨
- - さ/阝 + つ/土 = 陛
- - せ/食 + つ/土 = 鮭
- - つ/土 + ち/竹 = 地
- - つ/土 + ん/止 = 坂
- - つ/土 + も/門 = 均
- - つ/土 + ほ/方 = 坊
- - つ/土 + 宿 = 坑
- - つ/土 + 日 = 垣
- - つ/土 + む/車 = 埃
- - つ/土 + り/分 = 埋
- - つ/土 + ひ/辶 = 城
- - つ/土 + へ/⺩ = 埒
  - - つ/土 + つ/土 + へ/⺩ = 埓
- - つ/土 + ま/石 = 培
- - つ/土 + け/犬 = 埼
- - つ/土 + と/戸 = 堀
- - つ/土 + す/発 = 堅
  - - る/忄 + つ/土 + す/発 = 慳
  - - 心 + つ/土 + す/発 = 樫
  - - か/金 + つ/土 + す/発 = 鏗
  - - せ/食 + つ/土 + す/発 = 鰹
- - つ/土 + い/糹/#2 = 堆
- - つ/土 + ら/月 = 堕
  - - つ/土 + つ/土 + ら/月 = 墮
- - つ/土 + よ/广 = 堤
- - つ/土 + き/木 = 堪
- - つ/土 + 数 = 場
  - - つ/土 + つ/土 + 数 = 塲
    - - つ/土 + つ/土 + 数 = 塲
- - つ/土 + に/氵 = 塊
- - つ/土 + は/辶 = 塑
- - つ/土 + く/艹 = 塔
- - つ/土 + う/宀/#3 = 塚
- - つ/土 + ⺼ = 塩
- - つ/土 + な/亻 = 境
- - つ/土 + そ/馬 = 増
- - つ/土 + ふ/女 = 墳
- - つ/土 + る/忄 = 壊
  - - つ/土 + つ/土 + る/忄 = 壞
- - つ/土 + み/耳 = 壌
- - つ/土 + し/巿 = 寺
  - - や/疒 + つ/土 + し/巿 = 峙
  - - る/忄 + つ/土 + し/巿 = 恃
  - - た/⽥ + つ/土 + し/巿 = 畤
  - - つ/土 + 日 + し/巿 = 塒
- - つ/土 + か/金 = 幸
  - - つ/土 + お/頁 = 執
    - - て/扌 + つ/土 + お/頁 = 摯
    - - む/車 + つ/土 + お/頁 = 蟄
  - - つ/土 + ゐ/幺 = 報
  - - な/亻 + つ/土 + か/金 = 倖
  - - 囗 + つ/土 + か/金 = 圉
  - - す/発 + つ/土 + か/金 = 睾
  - - つ/土 + 龸 + せ/食 = 鷙
- - つ/土 + て/扌 = 捏
- - つ/土 + つ/土 + み/耳 = 壤
- - つ/土 + 比 + な/亻 = 圦
- - つ/土 + 比 + 龸 = 圷
- - つ/土 + や/疒 + selector 1 = 圸
- - つ/土 + 比 + を/貝 = 圻
- - つ/土 + ん/止 + selector 1 = 坎
- - つ/土 + selector 4 + ふ/女 = 坏
- - つ/土 + selector 4 + ひ/辶 = 坡
- - つ/土 + selector 5 + し/巿 = 坤
- - つ/土 + selector 4 + 日 = 坦
- - つ/土 + selector 4 + る/忄 = 坩
- - つ/土 + な/亻 + し/巿 = 坿
- - つ/土 + 仁/亻 + 囗 = 垈
- - つ/土 + も/門 + selector 2 = 垉
- - つ/土 + selector 5 + ゐ/幺 = 垓
- - つ/土 + 宿 + や/疒 = 垠
- - つ/土 + 宿 + れ/口 = 垢
- - つ/土 + 龸 + と/戸 = 垪
- - つ/土 + 比 + う/宀/#3 = 垰
- - つ/土 + 宿 + ゆ/彳 = 垳
- - つ/土 + 囗 + selector 6 = 埆
- - つ/土 + 宿 + ほ/方 = 埔
- - つ/土 + く/艹 + 比 = 埖
- - つ/土 + き/木 + き/木 = 埜
- - つ/土 + さ/阝 + ふ/女 = 埠
- - つ/土 + お/頁 + ろ/十 = 埣
- - つ/土 + ろ/十 + め/目 = 埴
- - つ/土 + ら/月 + ら/月 = 堋
- - つ/土 + 宿 + か/金 = 堝
- - つ/土 + な/亻 + れ/口 = 堡
- - つ/土 + 宿 + も/門 = 堰
- - つ/土 + 宿 + 日 = 堵
- - つ/土 + た/⽥ + 宿 = 堺
- - つ/土 + 宿 + へ/⺩ = 塀
- - 火 + 宿 + つ/土 = 塋
- - つ/土 + よ/广 + も/門 = 塘
- - つ/土 + 比 + え/訁 = 塙
- - つ/土 + せ/食 + う/宀/#3 = 塢
- - つ/土 + selector 1 + め/目 = 填
- - つ/土 + に/氵 + は/辶 = 塰
- - つ/土 + そ/馬 + 比 = 塵
- - つ/土 + む/車 + を/貝 = 塹
- - つ/土 + り/分 + よ/广 = 墅
- - つ/土 + す/発 + 火 = 墟
- - つ/土 + せ/食 + し/巿 = 墫
- - つ/土 + と/戸 + く/艹 = 墸
- - つ/土 + も/門 + 日 = 墹
- - つ/土 + 囗 + の/禾 = 墺
- - つ/土 + 囗 + れ/口 = 墻
- - つ/土 + 宿 + ひ/辶 = 壅
- - つ/土 + た/⽥ + selector 1 = 壑
- - よ/广 + よ/广 + つ/土 = 壓
- - つ/土 + 龸 + そ/馬 = 壕
- - つ/土 + ふ/女 + 火 = 壗
- - た/⽥ + た/⽥ + つ/土 = 壘
- - つ/土 + よ/广 + こ/子 = 壙
- - つ/土 + 日 + ち/竹 = 壜
- - つ/土 + ま/石 + 心 = 壟
- - 氷/氵 + 宿 + つ/土 = 汢
- - に/氵 + 宿 + つ/土 = 涅
- - ⺼ + 宿 + つ/土 = 肚
- - つ/土 + 比 + に/氵 = 堙
- - つ/土 + 宿 + よ/广 = 壥
- - つ/土 + selector 4 + ゆ/彳 = 垤
- - つ/土 + 宿 + つ/土 = 圭
  - - つ/土 + 宿 + と/戸 = 卦
    - - す/発 + 宿 + つ/土 = 罫
  - - れ/口 + 宿 + つ/土 = 啀
  - - け/犬 + 宿 + つ/土 = 奎
  - - ふ/女 + 宿 + つ/土 = 娃
  - - や/疒 + 龸 + つ/土 = 崕
  - - や/疒 + う/宀/#3 + つ/土 = 崖
  - - つ/土 + 宿 + 心 = 恚
  - - て/扌 + 宿 + つ/土 = 挂
  - - 心 + 宿 + つ/土 = 桂
  - - へ/⺩ + 宿 + つ/土 = 珪
  - - め/目 + 宿 + つ/土 = 睚
  - - ま/石 + 宿 + つ/土 = 硅
  - - ね/示 + 宿 + つ/土 = 袿
  - - と/戸 + 宿 + つ/土 = 鞋
  - - つ/土 + た/⽥ = 畦
  - - し/巿 + つ/土 + つ/土 = 幇

==== Compounds of 庄 ====
- - の/禾 + つ/土 = 粧
- - を/貝 + selector 4 + つ/土 = 賍

==== Compounds of 甬 ====
- - み/耳 + つ/土 = 踊
- - は/辶 + つ/土 = 通
  - - き/木 + は/辶 + つ/土 = 樋
- - や/疒 + つ/土 = 痛
- - 仁/亻 + 宿 + つ/土 = 俑
- - き/木 + 宿 + つ/土 = 桶
- - に/氵 + 龸 + つ/土 = 涌
  - - る/忄 + 宿 + つ/土 = 慂
- - え/訁 + 宿 + つ/土 = 誦
- - せ/食 + 龸 + つ/土 = 鯒

==== Compounds of 尭 ====
- - 日 + つ/土 = 暁
  - - 日 + 日 + つ/土 = 曉
- - 火 + つ/土 = 焼
  - - 火 + 火 + つ/土 = 燒
- - に/氵 + selector 6 + つ/土 = 澆
- - く/艹 + selector 6 + つ/土 = 蕘
- - な/亻 + 宿 + つ/土 = 僥
- - や/疒 + 宿 + つ/土 = 嶢
- - ま/石 + 龸 + つ/土 = 磽
- - い/糹/#2 + 宿 + つ/土 = 繞
- - つ/土 + む/車 + selector 2 = 翹
- - む/車 + 宿 + つ/土 = 蟯
- - ひ/辶 + 宿 + つ/土 = 遶
- - か/金 + 宿 + つ/土 = 鐃
- - せ/食 + 宿 + つ/土 = 饒
- - そ/馬 + 宿 + つ/土 = 驍

==== Compounds of 士 ====
- - つ/土 + selector 1 + selector 1 = 壼
  - - つ/土 + 宿 + selector 1 = 壷
  - - つ/土 + 龸 + selector 1 = 壺
- - な/亻 + つ/土 = 仕
- - へ/⺩ + つ/土 = 壮
  - - つ/土 + ね/示 = 装
    - - つ/土 + つ/土 + ね/示 = 裝
  - - へ/⺩ + へ/⺩ + つ/土 = 壯
    - - け/犬 + へ/⺩ + つ/土 = 奘
    - - と/戸 + へ/⺩ + つ/土 = 弉
- - つ/土 + れ/口 = 吉
  - - つ/土 + 囗 = 喜
    - - ふ/女 + つ/土 = 嬉
    - - つ/土 + ぬ/力 = 嘉
    - - な/亻 + つ/土 + 囗 = 僖
    - - る/忄 + つ/土 + 囗 = 憙
    - - き/木 + つ/土 + 囗 = 橲
    - - 火 + つ/土 + 囗 = 熹
    - - ね/示 + つ/土 + 囗 = 禧
    - - せ/食 + つ/土 + 囗 = 鱚
  - - な/亻 + つ/土 + れ/口 = 佶
  - - ぬ/力 + つ/土 + れ/口 = 劼
  - - て/扌 + つ/土 + れ/口 = 拮
  - - き/木 + つ/土 + れ/口 = 桔
  - - お/頁 + つ/土 + れ/口 = 頡
    - - い/糹/#2 + つ/土 + れ/口 = 纈
  - - と/戸 + つ/土 + れ/口 = 髻
  - - し/巿 + つ/土 + れ/口 = 黠
- - を/貝 + つ/土 = 贖
- - つ/土 + 心 = 志
  - - や/疒 + つ/土 + 心 = 痣
- - つ/土 + の/禾 = 穀

==== Compounds of 売 ====
- - え/訁 + つ/土 = 読
- - つ/土 + ゑ/訁 = 殻
  - - つ/土 + つ/土 + ゑ/訁 = 殼
    - - る/忄 + つ/土 + ゑ/訁 = 愨
- - い/糹/#2 + つ/土 = 続
- - に/氵 + つ/土 + を/貝 = 涜
- - つ/土 + つ/土 + を/貝 = 賣
  - - へ/⺩ + つ/土 + を/貝 = 牘
  - - そ/馬 + つ/土 + を/貝 = 犢
  - - め/目 + つ/土 + を/貝 = 覿
  - - し/巿 + つ/土 + を/貝 = 黷
- - つ/土 + う/宀/#3 + り/分 = 竇
- - い/糹/#2 + い/糹/#2 + つ/土 = 續
- - え/訁 + え/訁 + つ/土 = 讀

==== Compounds of 貫 ====
- - る/忄 + つ/土 = 慣
- - き/木 + 比 + つ/土 = 樌

==== Other compounds ====
- - つ/土 + 龸 = 先
  - - か/金 + つ/土 = 銑
  - - ち/竹 + つ/土 + 龸 = 筅
  - - み/耳 + つ/土 + 龸 = 跣
- - つ/土 + こ/子 = 去
  - - つ/土 + さ/阝 = 却
  - - ぬ/力 + つ/土 + こ/子 = 劫
  - - に/氵 + つ/土 + こ/子 = 溘
  - - も/門 + つ/土 + こ/子 = 闔
  - - つ/土 + 宿 + ⺼ = 盍
- - ⺼ + つ/土 = 爪
  - - て/扌 + ⺼ + つ/土 = 抓
  - - ひ/辶 + ⺼ + つ/土 = 爬
  - - ち/竹 + ⺼ + つ/土 = 笊
- - 心 + つ/土 = 瓜
  - - れ/口 + 心 + つ/土 = 呱
  - - き/木 + 心 + つ/土 = 柧
  - - け/犬 + 心 + つ/土 = 瓠
  - - む/車 + 心 + つ/土 = 瓣
- - つ/土 + つ/土 + ⺼ = 鹽
- - つ/土 + 宿 + せ/食 = 燕
  - - え/訁 + 龸 + つ/土 = 讌
