= Algerian Braille =

Braille system formerly used for Arabic in Algeria

- Script type: Abjad
- Print basis: Arabic alphabet
- Languages: Arabic

Related scripts
- Parent systems: Braille: (re-ordered); Algerian Braille

Algerian Braille was a braille alphabet used to write the Arabic language in Algeria. It is apparently obsolete.

In Algerian Braille, the braille letters are assigned in numeric order to the Arabic alphabet; standard Arabic Braille on the other hand uses a completely different assignment, following international norms based on the order of the French alphabet. For example, the fifth braille letter, ⠑, is used in Algerian Braille for ج j, the fifth letter of the Algerian/Arabic alphabet. In most braille alphabets today, ⠑ is used for e, the fifth letter of the French/Latin alphabet, or for a letter that sounds like e, no matter where it occurs in those alphabets.

Algerian-type remapping was common in early braille adaptations, but was largely abandoned in favor of mutually understandable standards beginning with the unification of French, English, German, and Arabic Braille on the original order in 1878.

== Algerian Braille chart ==
Print	ا	ب	ت	ث	ج	ح	خ	د	ذ	ر
Roman	’	b	t	th	j	ḥ	kh	d	dh	r
Braille	⠁ (braille pattern dots-1)	⠃ (braille pattern dots-12)	⠉ (braille pattern dots-14)	⠙ (braille pattern dots-145)	⠑ (braille pattern dots-15)	⠋ (braille pattern dots-124)	⠛ (braille pattern dots-1245)	⠓ (braille pattern dots-125)	⠊ (braille pattern dots-24)	⠚ (braille pattern dots-245)

Print	ز	س	ش	ص	ض	ط	ظ	ع	غ	ف
Roman	z	s	sh	ṣ	ḍ	ṭ	ẓ	‘	gh	f
Braille	⠅ (braille pattern dots-13)	⠇ (braille pattern dots-123)	⠍ (braille pattern dots-134)	⠝ (braille pattern dots-1345)	⠕ (braille pattern dots-135)	⠏ (braille pattern dots-1234)	⠟ (braille pattern dots-12345)	⠗ (braille pattern dots-1235)	⠎ (braille pattern dots-234)	⠞ (braille pattern dots-2345)

Print	ق	ك	ل	م	ن	ه	و	ي	ى	ء
Roman	q	k	l	m	n	h	w	y	ā	’
Braille	⠥ (braille pattern dots-136)	⠧ (braille pattern dots-1236)	⠭ (braille pattern dots-1346)	⠽ (braille pattern dots-13456)	⠵ (braille pattern dots-1356)	⠯ (braille pattern dots-12346)	⠿ (braille pattern dots-123456)	⠷ (braille pattern dots-12356)	⠮ (braille pattern dots-2346)	⠾ (braille pattern dots-23456)

Print	ة	ـّ	ـٓ	ـُ	ـَ	ـِ	ـْ	ـٌ	ـً	ـٍ
Roman	ẗ	(dbl)	:	u	a	i	–	un	an	in
Braille	⠡ (braille pattern dots-16)	⠣ (braille pattern dots-126)	⠩ (braille pattern dots-146)	⠹ (braille pattern dots-1456)	⠱ (braille pattern dots-156)	⠫ (braille pattern dots-1246)	⠻ (braille pattern dots-12456)	⠳ (braille pattern dots-1256)	⠪ (braille pattern dots-246)	⠺ (braille pattern dots-2456)

Print	ﻻ
Roman	la
Braille	⠔ (braille pattern dots-35)
