= Arabic Braille =

Braille alphabet of the Arabic language

Arabic Braille ⠃⠗⠊⠇⠀⠷⠗⠃⠊⠡
- Script type: abjad ca. 1950
- Print basis: Arabic alphabet
- Languages: Arabic

Related scripts
- Parent systems: Braille: English Braille; Coptic Braille; Arabic Braille

Arabic Braille (Arabic: بِرَيْل الْعَرَبِيَّة, birayl alʿarabīyah) is the braille alphabet for the Arabic language. It descends from a braille alphabet brought to Egypt by an English missionary prior to 1878, so the letter assignments generally correspond to English Braille and to the same romanization as in other braille systems, like Greek and Russian. However, there were once multiple standards, some of which (such as Algerian Braille) were unrelated to Coptic Braille. A unified Arabic Braille was adopted in the 1950s as part of the move toward international braille, and it is the standard throughout the Arab world. Other Arabic-based alphabets have braille systems similar to Arabic Braille, such as Urdu and Persian Braille, but differ in some letter and diacritic assignments.

Unlike the Arabic script, Arabic Braille is read from left to right, following the international convention. Numbers are also left to right, as in printed Arabic.

== Arabic Braille chart ==
Arabic Braille includes numerous abbreviations, some marked by dot 4 or dot 5 (the comma), which are not described here. A conference in Saudi Arabia in 2002 set up a unified braille standard for Arabic, but as of 2013 not all countries had signed up; those not adopting the standard include some Arab countries but also non-Arab Muslim countries such as Iran, Malaysia, and Indonesia.

=== Letters ===
Although short-vowel letters are not diacritics in Arabic Braille, they are optional and generally omitted, just as in print Arabic.

Print	ا	ب	پ	ت	ث	ج	ح	خ	د	ذ	ر
Braille	⠁ (braille pattern dots-1)	⠃ (braille pattern dots-12)	⠱ (braille pattern dots-156)	⠞ (braille pattern dots-2345)	⠹ (braille pattern dots-1456)	⠚ (braille pattern dots-245)	⠱ (braille pattern dots-156)	⠭ (braille pattern dots-1346)	⠙ (braille pattern dots-145)	⠮ (braille pattern dots-2346)	⠗ (braille pattern dots-1235)
Braille (Unicode)	⠁	⠃		⠞	⠹	⠚	⠱	⠭	⠙	⠮	⠗

Print	ز	س	ش	ص	ض	ط	ظ	ع	غ	ف
Braille	⠵ (braille pattern dots-1356)	⠎ (braille pattern dots-234)	⠩ (braille pattern dots-146)	⠯ (braille pattern dots-12346)	⠫ (braille pattern dots-1246)	⠾ (braille pattern dots-23456)	⠿ (braille pattern dots-123456)	⠷ (braille pattern dots-12356)	⠣ (braille pattern dots-126)	⠋ (braille pattern dots-124)
Braille (Unicode)	⠵	⠎	⠩	⠯	⠫	⠾	⠿	⠷	⠣	⠋

Print	ق	ك	ل	م	ن	ه	و	ي	ى	ة
Braille	⠟ (braille pattern dots-12345)	⠅ (braille pattern dots-13)	⠇ (braille pattern dots-123)	⠍ (braille pattern dots-134)	⠝ (braille pattern dots-1345)	⠓ (braille pattern dots-125)	⠺ (braille pattern dots-2456)	⠊ (braille pattern dots-24)	⠕ (braille pattern dots-135)	⠡ (braille pattern dots-16)
Braille (Unicode)	⠟	⠅	⠇	⠍	⠝	⠓	⠺	⠊	⠕	⠡

Print	ال	ﻻ	أ	إ	آ	أو	ؤ	ئ	ء
Braille	⠉ (braille pattern dots-14)	⠧ (braille pattern dots-1236)	⠌ (braille pattern dots-34)	⠨ (braille pattern dots-46)	⠜ (braille pattern dots-345)	⠪ (braille pattern dots-246)	⠳ (braille pattern dots-1256)	⠽ (braille pattern dots-13456)	⠄ (braille pattern dots-3)
Braille (Unicode)	⠉	⠧	⠌	⠨	⠜	⠪	⠳	⠽	⠄

Print	ــُ	ــَ	ــِ	ــٌ	ــً	ــٍ	ــْ	ــّ
Braille	⠥ (braille pattern dots-136)	⠂ (braille pattern dots-2)	⠑ (braille pattern dots-15)	⠢ (braille pattern dots-26)	⠆ (braille pattern dots-23)	⠔ (braille pattern dots-35)	⠒ (braille pattern dots-25)	⠠ (braille pattern dots-6)
Braille (Unicode)	⠥	⠂	⠑	⠢	⠆	⠔	⠒	⠠

Shaddah ⟨ــّ⟩ comes before the consonant; sukun ⟨ــْ⟩ and the vowels after.

=== Digits ===
Arabic Braille follows the French convention. A couple of these cells, namely ⠉ '3' and ⠛ '7', are not used for letters.

Print		١ 1	٢ 2	٣ 3	٤ 4	٥ 5	٦ 6	٧ 7	٨ 8	٩ 9	٠ 0
Braille	⠼ (braille pattern dots-3456)	⠁ (braille pattern dots-1)	⠃ (braille pattern dots-12)	⠉ (braille pattern dots-14)	⠙ (braille pattern dots-145)	⠑ (braille pattern dots-15)	⠋ (braille pattern dots-124)	⠛ (braille pattern dots-1245)	⠓ (braille pattern dots-125)	⠊ (braille pattern dots-24)	⠚ (braille pattern dots-245)

=== Punctuation and formatting ===
There are some differences in quotation marks, brackets, and underlining between traditional and unified Arabic braille conventions.

Common punctuation

Print	،	؛	:	.	!	؟	-
Braille	⠐ (braille pattern dots-5)	⠰ (braille pattern dots-56)	⠐ (braille pattern dots-5) ⠂ (braille pattern dots-2)	⠲ (braille pattern dots-256)	⠖ (braille pattern dots-235)	⠦ (braille pattern dots-236)	⠤ (braille pattern dots-36)
Braille (Unicode)	⠐	⠰	⠐⠂	⠲	⠖	⠦	⠤

Legacy punctuation

Print	“...”	(...)	*	abbre- viation	under- lining
Braille	...	...	⠔ (braille pattern dots-35)	⠈ (braille pattern dots-4)	⠨ (braille pattern dots-46)
Braille (Unicode)	⠦ ⠴	⠶ ⠶	⠔⠔	⠈	⠨

Unified Arabic punctuation

Print	“...”	(...)	[...]	{...}	underlining
Braille	...	...	...	...	⠠ (braille pattern dots-6) ⠤ (braille pattern dots-36)
Braille (Unicode)	⠶ ⠶	⠦ ⠴	⠠⠦ ⠴⠄	⠐⠦ ⠴⠂	⠠⠤

== See also ==
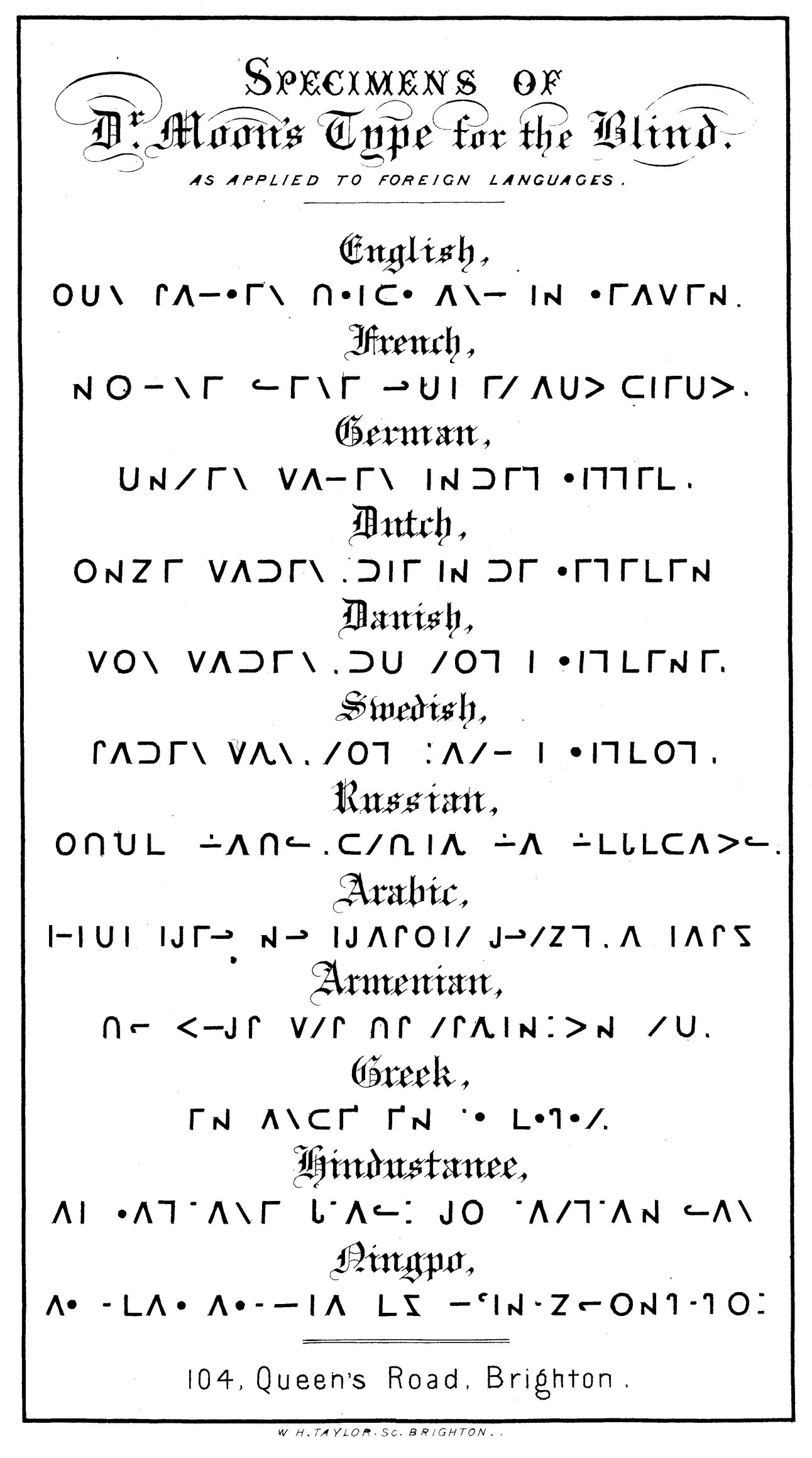
A sample of Moon type in various languages including Arabic.

- Moon type is a simplification of the Latin alphabet for embossing. An adaptation for Arabic-reading blind people has been proposed.
