= Irish Braille =

Braille system for Irish

- Script type: alphabet
- Print basis: Irish alphabet
- Languages: Irish

Related scripts
- Parent systems: Braille: English Braille; Irish Braille

Irish Braille is the braille alphabet of the Irish language. It is augmented by specifically Irish letters for vowels with acute accents in print:

⠯ (braille pattern dots-12346)	⠿ (braille pattern dots-123456)	⠷ (braille pattern dots-12356)	⠮ (braille pattern dots-2346)	⠾ (braille pattern dots-23456)
á	é	í	ó	ú

⠿ é and ⠾ ú are coincidentally the French Braille letters for é and ù: They are simply the braille letters of the third decade after z, assigned to print in alphabetical order.

Irish Braille also uses some of the Grade-1 1/2 shortcuts of English Braille,

⠡ (braille pattern dots-16)	⠣ (braille pattern dots-126)	⠩ (braille pattern dots-146)	⠹ (braille pattern dots-1456)	⠫ (braille pattern dots-1246)	⠻ (braille pattern dots-12456)	⠌ (braille pattern dots-34)	⠬ (braille pattern dots-346)	⠜ (braille pattern dots-345)	⠂ (braille pattern dots-2)	⠒ (braille pattern dots-25)	⠲ (braille pattern dots-256)	⠤ (braille pattern dots-36)	⠢ (braille pattern dots-26)	⠔ (braille pattern dots-35)
ch	gh	sh	th	ed	er	st	ing	ar*	ea	con	dis	com†	en	in

*⠜ only has the value ar in prose. In poetry, it is used to mark a new line, like "/" in print.

†Abolished in Updated Irish Braille (see below)

These shortcuts are not used across elements of compound words. For example, in uiscerian (uisce-rian) "aqueduct", e-r is spelled out, as is s-t in trastomhas (tras-tomhas) "diameter". There are no special braille letters for dotted consonants. The letter h is used instead, as in modern print. A shortcut may be used even when the final consonant is lenited with h; comh, for example, is written ⠤⠓ com-h.

The only word-sign is the letter ⠎ s for agus "and".

Traditionally the letters j k q v w x y z were not part of the Irish alphabet, but apart from w they have been introduced through English loans, so they occur in Irish Braille. Punctuation is the same as in English Braille.

== Updated Irish Braille ==
In 2014, the Irish National Braille and Alternative Format Association approved a new standard, Updated Irish Braille (UIB), designed largely to match Unified English Braille for ease of use by bilingual braille readers.

UIB uses most of the contractions of UEB, with the exception of the doubled letters bb ⠆, cc ⠒, ff ⠖, and gg ⠶. These must be written as ⠃⠃, ⠉⠉, ⠋⠋, and ⠛⠛ respectively. The contractions used are as shown above.

A full set of wordsigns has been added:

Letter	Braille	Word	Letter	Braille	Word
b	⠃	bíonn	bh	⠃⠓	bhíonn
c	⠉	cathain	ch	⠡	chuaigh
d	⠙	déanamh	dh	⠙⠓	dhéanamh
e	⠑	eile	—		
f	⠋	féidir	fh	⠋⠓	fhéidir
g	⠛	gach	gh	⠣	gheobhaidh
h	⠓	halla	—		
l	⠇	leis	—		
m	⠍	maith	mh	⠍⠓	mhaith
n	⠝	nuair	—		
o	⠕	oíche	—		
p	⠏	píosa	ph	⠏⠓	phíosa
r	⠗	raibh	—		
s	⠎	agus	sh	⠩	shampla
t	⠞	tabhair	th	⠹	tháinig
u	⠥	uaireanta	—		
v	⠧	véarsa	—		

(Even when a lenited letter requires two cells, it is treated as one letter in Irish.) In addition, the letters ⠁ a, ⠊ i, ⠯ á, ⠿ é, ⠷ í, and ⠮ ó, along with the digraphs ⠔ in and ⠜ ar, are Irish words in their own right, and are treated as wordsigns.

The third-decade English wordsigns and, for, of, the, and with are not used as wordsigns nor as contractions. The first three are spelled out ⠁⠝⠙, ⠋⠕⠗, and ⠕⠋, while the last two use the th contraction ⠹⠑ and ⠺⠊⠹. All occurrences of ⠯⠿⠷⠮⠾ in UIB text are for vowels with accents.

The only shortform word in UIB is b-r-l ⠃⠗⠇ "braille".
