= Braille pattern dots-123456 =

Braille pattern

6-dot braille cells
⠀	⠁	⠃	⠉	⠙	⠑	⠋	⠛	⠓	⠊	⠚	⠈	⠘
⠄	⠅	⠇	⠍	⠝	⠕	⠏	⠟	⠗	⠎	⠞	⠌	⠜
⠤	⠥	⠧	⠭	⠽	⠵	⠯	⠿	⠷	⠮	⠾	⠬	⠼
⠠	⠡	⠣	⠩	⠹	⠱	⠫	⠻	⠳	⠪	⠺	⠨	⠸
shift down	⠂	⠆	⠒	⠲	⠢	⠖	⠶	⠦	⠔	⠴	⠐	⠰

The Braille pattern dots-123456 ( ⠿ ) is a 6-dot braille cell with all six dots raised, or an 8-dot braille cell with both dots in the top three rows raised. It is represented by the Unicode code point U+283F, and in Braille ASCII with the equal sign.

Character information
Preview	⠿ (braille pattern dots-123456)	
Unicode name	BRAILLE PATTERN DOTS-123456	
Encodings	decimal	hex
Unicode	10303	U+283F
UTF-8	226 160 191	E2 A0 BF
Numeric character reference	&#10303;	&#x283F;
Braille ASCII	61	3D

== Unified Braille ==
In unified international braille, the braille pattern dots-123456 is used to represent a voiced dental/alveolar fricative or aspirant, such as /ð/, /z/, or /dʰ/ when multiple letters correspond to these values, and is otherwise assigned as needed.

=== Table of unified braille values ===
French Braille	É, "quoi"
English Braille	"for"
German Braille	% and "es"
Bharati Braille	ḍh / ढ / ঢ / ਢ / ઢ / ಢ / ఢ / ඪ / ଢ / ഢ / ڈھ
Icelandic Braille	@
IPA Braille	ɲ
Slovak Braille	=
Arabic Braille	ظ
Persian Braille	ظ
Irish Braille	É

== Other braille ==
Japanese Braille	me / め / メ
Korean Braille	ong / 옹
Mainland Chinese Braille	wa, -ua
Taiwanese Braille	wen, -un / ㄨㄣ
Two-Cell Chinese Braille	nü- -ǎi
Nemeth Braille	Omission indicator
Gardner Salinas Braille	Quantity symbol
Algerian Braille	و

Braille pattern dots-123456 is also used for the tactile feature on Canadian banknotes.

== Plus dots 7 and 8 ==
Related to Braille pattern dots-123456 are Braille patterns 1234567, 1234568, and 12345678, which are used in 8-dot braille systems, such as Gardner-Salinas and Luxembourgish Braille.

Character information
Preview	⡿ (braille pattern dots-1234567)		⢿ (braille pattern dots-1234568)		⣿ (braille pattern dots-12345678)	
Unicode name	BRAILLE PATTERN DOTS-1234567		BRAILLE PATTERN DOTS-1234568		BRAILLE PATTERN DOTS-12345678	
Encodings	decimal	hex	dec	hex	dec	hex
Unicode	10367	U+287F	10431	U+28BF	10495	U+28FF
UTF-8	226 161 191	E2 A1 BF	226 162 191	E2 A2 BF	226 163 191	E2 A3 BF
Numeric character reference	&#10367;	&#x287F;	&#10431;	&#x28BF;	&#10495;	&#x28FF;

	dots 1234567	dots 1234568	dots 12345678
Gardner Salinas Braille	large modifier	‡ (double dagger)	≡ (identity sign)
Luxembourgish Braille		é (minuscule)	É (capital)

== Related 8-dot kantenji patterns ==
In the Japanese kantenji braille, the standard 8-dot Braille patterns 235678, 1235678, 2345678, and 12345678 are the patterns related to Braille pattern dots-123456, since the two additional dots of kantenji patterns 0123456, 1234567, and 01234567 are placed above the base 6-dot cell, instead of below, as in standard 8-dot braille.

Character information
Preview	⣶ (braille pattern dots-235678)		⣷ (braille pattern dots-1235678)		⣾ (braille pattern dots-2345678)		⣿ (braille pattern dots-12345678)	
Unicode name	BRAILLE PATTERN DOTS-235678		BRAILLE PATTERN DOTS-1235678		BRAILLE PATTERN DOTS-2345678		BRAILLE PATTERN DOTS-12345678	
Encodings	decimal	hex	dec	hex	dec	hex	dec	hex
Unicode	10486	U+28F6	10487	U+28F7	10494	U+28FE	10495	U+28FF
UTF-8	226 163 182	E2 A3 B6	226 163 183	E2 A3 B7	226 163 190	E2 A3 BE	226 163 191	E2 A3 BF
Numeric character reference	&#10486;	&#x28F6;	&#10487;	&#x28F7;	&#10494;	&#x28FE;	&#10495;	&#x28FF;

=== Kantenji using braille patterns 235678, 1235678, 2345678, or 12345678 ===
This listing includes kantenji using Braille pattern dots-123456 for all 6349 kanji found in JIS C 6226-1978.

- - 目

==== Variants and thematic compounds ====
- - め/目 + selector 1 = 自
- - め/目 + selector 3 + selector 3 = 睿
- - め/目 + selector 4 = 面
- - selector 1 + め/目 = 真
  - - selector 1 + selector 1 + め/目 = 眞
- - selector 3 + め/目 = 乂
- - selector 4 + め/目 = 牙
- - selector 5 + め/目 = 黽
- - selector 6 + め/目 = 弗
- - 比 + め/目 = 亀
- - 数 + め/目 = 百

==== Compounds of 目 ====
- - 日 + め/目 = 冒
  - - し/巿 + め/目 = 帽
  - - へ/⺩ + 日 + め/目 = 瑁
- - め/目 + 宿 = 見
  - - 宿 + め/目 = 寛
  - - へ/⺩ + め/目 = 現
  - - 龸 + め/目 = 覚
    - - 龸 + 龸 + め/目 = 覺
    - - て/扌 + 龸 + め/目 = 撹
  - - ま/石 + め/目 = 親
    - - ね/示 + ま/石 + め/目 = 襯
  - - け/犬 + め/目 = 観
    - - け/犬 + け/犬 + め/目 = 觀
    - - 心 + け/犬 + め/目 = 欟
  - - め/目 + り/分 = 窺
  - - め/目 + 仁/亻 = 覗
  - - ね/示 + め/目 = 視
  - - め/目 + す/発 = 覧
    - - て/扌 + め/目 + す/発 = 攬
    - - 心 + め/目 + す/発 = 欖
    - - い/糹/#2 + め/目 + す/発 = 纜
    - - め/目 + め/目 + す/発 = 覽
  - - な/亻 + め/目 + 宿 = 俔
  - - ま/石 + め/目 + 宿 = 硯
  - - ち/竹 + め/目 + 宿 = 筧
  - - む/車 + め/目 + 宿 = 蜆
  - - 龸 + め/目 + 宿 = 覓
  - - れ/口 + め/目 + 宿 = 覘
  - - 仁/亻 + め/目 + 宿 = 覡
  - - ゆ/彳 + め/目 + 宿 = 覦
  - - と/戸 + め/目 + 宿 = 覩
  - - や/疒 + め/目 + 宿 = 覬
  - - き/木 + め/目 + 宿 = 覲
  - - め/目 + め/目 + 宿 = 靦
  - - め/目 + 宿 + む/車 = 覯
  - - め/目 + め/目 + 宿 = 靦
- - ふ/女 + め/目 = 媚
- - ろ/十 + め/目 = 直
  - - な/亻 + め/目 = 値
  - - ほ/方 + め/目 = 殖
  - - す/発 + め/目 = 置
  - - め/目 + き/木 = 植
  - - つ/土 + ろ/十 + め/目 = 埴
  - - る/忄 + ろ/十 + め/目 = 悳
  - - め/目 + ろ/十 + め/目 = 矗
  - - の/禾 + ろ/十 + め/目 = 稙
- - ひ/辶 + め/目 = 遁
- - き/木 + め/目 = 相
  - - ち/竹 + め/目 = 箱
  - - よ/广 + き/木 + め/目 = 廂
  - - に/氵 + き/木 + め/目 = 湘
- - よ/广 + め/目 = 盾
  - - ゆ/彳 + め/目 = 循
  - - き/木 + よ/广 + め/目 = 楯
- - そ/馬 + め/目 = 省
- - う/宀/#3 + め/目 = 督
- - め/目 + ゑ/訁 = 叡
- - め/目 + る/忄 = 懸
- - め/目 + て/扌 = 攫
- - め/目 + ほ/方 = 盲
- - め/目 + せ/食 = 眉
  - - や/疒 + め/目 + せ/食 = 嵋
- - め/目 + か/金 = 看
- - め/目 + ゐ/幺 = 県
  - - め/目 + め/目 + ゐ/幺 = 縣
- - め/目 + ん/止 = 眠
- - め/目 + う/宀/#3 = 眺
- - め/目 + や/疒 = 眼
- - め/目 + そ/馬 = 着
- - め/目 + に/氵 = 睡
- - め/目 + む/車 = 睦
- - め/目 + こ/子 = 睨
- - め/目 + 氷/氵 = 瞥
- - め/目 + 龸 = 瞬
- - め/目 + ろ/十 = 瞭
- - め/目 + ま/石 = 瞳
- - め/目 + 日 = 瞼
- - め/目 + は/辶 = 瞽
- - め/目 + と/戸 = 算
- - 日 + 宿 + め/目 = 冐
- - う/宀/#3 + め/目 + う/宀/#3 = 鼎
- - め/目 + 宿 + く/艹 = 瞿
  - - め/目 + い/糹/#2 + ゑ/訁 = 矍
    - - か/金 + め/目 + め/目 = 钁
- - て/扌 + 宿 + め/目 = 攪
- - に/氵 + 宿 + め/目 = 泪
- - め/目 + 宿 + も/門 = 盻
- - め/目 + 宿 + う/宀/#3 = 眄
- - め/目 + ほ/方 + そ/馬 = 眇
- - め/目 + 宿 + 龸 = 眈
- - め/目 + き/木 + selector 4 = 眛
- - め/目 + と/戸 + 仁/亻 = 眤
- - め/目 + 宿 + 比 = 眥
- - め/目 + 比 + selector 4 = 眦
- - め/目 + 龸 + ゐ/幺 = 眩
- - め/目 + 宿 + け/犬 = 眷
- - め/目 + selector 5 + む/車 = 眸
- - め/目 + ゆ/彳 + 宿 = 睇
- - め/目 + 宿 + つ/土 = 睚
- - め/目 + し/巿 + せ/食 = 睛
- - め/目 + た/⽥ + さ/阝 = 睥
- - め/目 + 宿 + ま/石 = 睫
- - め/目 + と/戸 + 日 = 睹
- - め/目 + 宿 + へ/⺩ = 瞎
- - め/目 + 龸 + 日 = 瞑
- - め/目 + 宿 + め/目 = 瞞
- - め/目 + 宿 + め/目 = 瞞
- - め/目 + 龸 + つ/土 = 瞠
- - め/目 + み/耳 + 氷/氵 = 瞰
- - め/目 + を/貝 + き/木 = 瞶
- - め/目 + 龸 + selector 1 = 瞹
- - め/目 + 宿 + 日 = 瞻
- - め/目 + 宿 + そ/馬 = 矇
- - め/目 + と/戸 + み/耳 = 矚
- - 心 + 龸 + め/目 = 苜
- - め/目 + つ/土 + を/貝 = 覿
- - め/目 + 宿 + い/糹/#2 = 雎

==== Compounds of 自 ====
- - れ/口 + め/目 = 嗅
- - め/目 + 心 = 息
  - - 火 + め/目 + 心 = 熄
- - め/目 + け/犬 = 臭
  - - も/門 + め/目 + け/犬 = 闃
- - め/目 + た/⽥ = 鼻
  - - れ/口 + め/目 + た/⽥ = 嚊
  - - ふ/女 + め/目 + た/⽥ = 嬶
  - - か/金 + め/目 + た/⽥ = 鼾

==== Compounds of 睿 ====
- - に/氵 + 龸 + め/目 = 濬

==== Compounds of 面 ====
- - に/氵 + め/目 + selector 4 = 湎
- - い/糹/#2 + め/目 + selector 4 = 緬
- - よ/广 + め/目 + selector 4 = 靨
- - す/発 + め/目 + selector 4 = 麺
- - め/目 + も/門 + selector 2 = 靤

==== Compounds of 真 and 眞 ====
- - る/忄 + め/目 = 慎
  - - る/忄 + る/忄 + め/目 = 愼
- - か/金 + め/目 = 鎮
  - - か/金 + か/金 + め/目 = 鎭
- - め/目 + お/頁 = 顛
  - - や/疒 + selector 1 + め/目 = 癲
- - れ/口 + selector 1 + め/目 = 嗔
- - つ/土 + selector 1 + め/目 = 填
- - 心 + selector 1 + め/目 = 槙
- - め/目 + selector 1 + め/目 = 瞋
- - め/目 + せ/食 + selector 1 = 鷆
- - め/目 + 龸 + せ/食 = 鷏

==== Compounds of 乂 ====
- - 心 + め/目 = 艾
- - め/目 + ぬ/力 = 刈
  - - く/艹 + め/目 + ぬ/力 = 苅
- - め/目 + ね/示 = 刹
- - め/目 + し/巿 = 希
  - - れ/口 + め/目 + し/巿 = 唏
  - - 日 + め/目 + し/巿 = 晞
  - - ん/止 + め/目 + し/巿 = 欷
  - - の/禾 + め/目 + し/巿 = 稀
  - - せ/食 + め/目 + し/巿 = 鯑
- - め/目 + の/禾 = 殺
- - め/目 + ⺼ = 肴
  - - に/氵 + め/目 + ⺼ = 淆
- - 囗 + め/目 + の/禾 = 弑
- - め/目 + 龸 + ち/竹 = 爻
  - - め/目 + selector 5 + そ/馬 = 爼
  - - な/亻 + 宿 + め/目 = 爽

==== Compounds of 牙 ====
- - り/分 + め/目 = 穿
- - く/艹 + め/目 = 芽
- - え/訁 + め/目 = 訝
- - め/目 + さ/阝 = 邪
- - め/目 + い/糹/#2 = 雅
- - れ/口 + selector 4 + め/目 = 呀
- - 氷/氵 + 宿 + め/目 = 冴
- - め/目 + た/⽥ + selector 1 = 谺
- - め/目 + 宿 + せ/食 = 鴉

==== Compounds of 黽 ====
- - い/糹/#2 + め/目 = 縄
  - - い/糹/#2 + い/糹/#2 + め/目 = 繩
- - む/車 + め/目 = 蝿
- - む/車 + 宿 + め/目 = 蠅
- - の/禾 + 宿 + め/目 = 龝

==== Compounds of 弗 ====
- - 氷/氵 + め/目 = 沸
- - め/目 + を/貝 = 費
- - 仁/亻 + め/目 = 仏
  - - 仁/亻 + 仁/亻 + め/目 = 佛
- - て/扌 + め/目 = 払
  - - て/扌 + て/扌 + め/目 = 拂
- - と/戸 + selector 6 + め/目 = 髴
- - ゆ/彳 + 宿 + め/目 = 彿
- - る/忄 + 宿 + め/目 = 怫
- - け/犬 + 宿 + め/目 = 狒

==== Compounds of 亀 ====
- - の/禾 + 比 + め/目 = 穐
- - 比 + 比 + め/目 = 龜
  - - も/門 + 比 + め/目 = 鬮
- - ほ/方 + 比 + め/目 = 鼇
- - 氷/氵 + 比 + め/目 = 鼈

==== Compounds of 百 ====
- - な/亻 + 数 + め/目 = 佰
- - ゆ/彳 + 数 + め/目 = 弼
- - 心 + 数 + め/目 = 栢
- - か/金 + 数 + め/目 = 瓸
- - ま/石 + 数 + め/目 = 竡
- - の/禾 + 数 + め/目 = 粨
- - そ/馬 + 数 + め/目 = 貊
- - さ/阝 + 数 + め/目 = 陌

==== Other compounds ====
- - ゐ/幺 + め/目 = 綿
- - 心 + 宿 + め/目 = 棉
- - ゐ/幺 + 宿 + め/目 = 緜
- - か/金 + 宿 + め/目 = 錦
- - 囗 + め/目 = 爾
  - - に/氵 + に/氵 + め/目 = 滿
    - - に/氵 + め/目 = 満
      - - る/忄 + に/氵 + め/目 = 懣
  - - め/目 + へ/⺩ = 璽
  - - ゆ/彳 + 囗 + め/目 = 彌
    - - 氷/氵 + 囗 + め/目 = 瀰
  - - に/氵 + 囗 + め/目 = 濔
  - - ね/示 + 囗 + め/目 = 禰
- - み/耳 + 宿 + め/目 = 蹣
- - れ/口 + 宿 + め/目 = 嚏
- - れ/口 + う/宀/#3 + め/目 = 嚔
- - そ/馬 + 宿 + め/目 = 牝
- - ひ/辶 + 囗 + め/目 = 迩
