= Braille pattern dots-12346 =

Braille pattern

6-dot braille cells
⠀	⠁	⠃	⠉	⠙	⠑	⠋	⠛	⠓	⠊	⠚	⠈	⠘
⠄	⠅	⠇	⠍	⠝	⠕	⠏	⠟	⠗	⠎	⠞	⠌	⠜
⠤	⠥	⠧	⠭	⠽	⠵	⠯	⠿	⠷	⠮	⠾	⠬	⠼
⠠	⠡	⠣	⠩	⠹	⠱	⠫	⠻	⠳	⠪	⠺	⠨	⠸
shift down	⠂	⠆	⠒	⠲	⠢	⠖	⠶	⠦	⠔	⠴	⠐	⠰

The Braille pattern dots-12346 ( ⠯ ) is a 6-dot braille cell with both top, both bottom, and the middle left dots raised, or an 8-dot braille cell with both top, both lower-middle, and the upper-middle left dots raised. It is represented by the Unicode code point U+282f, and in Braille ASCII with the ampersand: &.

Character information
Preview	⠯ (braille pattern dots-12346)	
Unicode name	BRAILLE PATTERN DOTS-12346	
Encodings	decimal	hex
Unicode	10287	U+282F
UTF-8	226 160 175	E2 A0 AF
Numeric character reference	&#10287;	&#x282F;
Braille ASCII	38	26

== Unified Braille ==
In unified international braille, the braille pattern dots-12346 is used to represent a voiceless alveolar or dental fricative, such as /s/ or /s̪/ when multiple letters correspond to these values, and is otherwise assigned as needed.

=== Table of unified braille values ===
French Braille	Ç, our, "pour"
English Braille	and
German Braille	&, ge
Bharati Braille	ष / ષ / ষ / ଷ / ష / ಷ / ഷ / ஷ / ෂ / ص
Icelandic Braille	Ý
IPA Braille	click modifier
Slovak Braille	Ý
Arabic Braille	ص
Persian Braille	ص
Irish Braille	Á
Thai Braille	ป p

== Other braille ==
Japanese Braille	he / へ / ヘ
Korean Braille	ul / 울
Mainland Chinese Braille	yuan, -üan
Taiwanese Braille	weng, -ong / ㄨㄥ
Two-Cell Chinese Braille	nu- -ǎn
Nemeth Braille	! (factorial)
Gardner Salinas Braille	& (ampersand)
Algerian Braille	ه

== Plus dots 7 and 8 ==
Related to Braille pattern dots-12346 are Braille patterns 123467, 123468, and 1234678, which are used in 8-dot braille systems, such as Gardner-Salinas and Luxembourgish Braille.

Character information
Preview	⡯ (braille pattern dots-123467)		⢯ (braille pattern dots-123468)		⣯ (braille pattern dots-1234678)	
Unicode name	BRAILLE PATTERN DOTS-123467		BRAILLE PATTERN DOTS-123468		BRAILLE PATTERN DOTS-1234678	
Encodings	decimal	hex	dec	hex	dec	hex
Unicode	10351	U+286F	10415	U+28AF	10479	U+28EF
UTF-8	226 161 175	E2 A1 AF	226 162 175	E2 A2 AF	226 163 175	E2 A3 AF
Numeric character reference	&#10351;	&#x286F;	&#10415;	&#x28AF;	&#10479;	&#x28EF;

	dots 123467	dots 123468	dots 1234678
Gardner Salinas Braille			

== Related 8-dot kantenji patterns ==
In the Japanese kantenji braille, the standard 8-dot Braille patterns 23578, 123578, 234578, and 1234578 are the patterns related to Braille pattern dots-12346, since the two additional dots of kantenji patterns 012346, 123467, and 0123467 are placed above the base 6-dot cell, instead of below, as in standard 8-dot braille.

Character information
Preview	⣖ (braille pattern dots-23578)		⣗ (braille pattern dots-123578)		⣞ (braille pattern dots-234578)		⣟ (braille pattern dots-1234578)	
Unicode name	BRAILLE PATTERN DOTS-23578		BRAILLE PATTERN DOTS-123578		BRAILLE PATTERN DOTS-234578		BRAILLE PATTERN DOTS-1234578	
Encodings	decimal	hex	dec	hex	dec	hex	dec	hex
Unicode	10454	U+28D6	10455	U+28D7	10462	U+28DE	10463	U+28DF
UTF-8	226 163 150	E2 A3 96	226 163 151	E2 A3 97	226 163 158	E2 A3 9E	226 163 159	E2 A3 9F
Numeric character reference	&#10454;	&#x28D6;	&#10455;	&#x28D7;	&#10462;	&#x28DE;	&#10463;	&#x28DF;

=== Kantenji using braille patterns 23578, 123578, 234578, or 1234578 ===
This listing includes kantenji using Braille pattern dots-12346 for all 6349 kanji found in JIS C 6226-1978.

- - 玉

==== Variants and thematic compounds ====
- - selector 4 + へ/⺩ = 冊
  - - selector 4 + selector 4 + へ/⺩ = 册
- - へ/⺩ + selector 1 = 王
- - へ/⺩ + selector 2 = 将
  - - へ/⺩ + selector 2 + selector 2 = 爿
- - へ/⺩ + selector 3 = 主
- - へ/⺩ + selector 5 = 片
- - 数 + へ/⺩ = 丙
- - 比 + へ/⺩ = 出

==== Compounds of 玉 ====
- - 囗 + へ/⺩ = 国
  - - selector 1 + 囗 + へ/⺩ = 囗
  - - 囗 + 囗 + へ/⺩ = 國
    - - し/巿 + 囗 + へ/⺩ = 幗
    - - ⺼ + 囗 + へ/⺩ = 膕
  - - て/扌 + 囗 + へ/⺩ = 掴
  - - き/木 + 囗 + へ/⺩ = 椢
- - う/宀/#3 + へ/⺩ = 宝
  - - う/宀/#3 + う/宀/#3 + へ/⺩ = 寶
    - - selector 1 + う/宀/#3 + へ/⺩ = 寳
  - - 火 + う/宀/#3 + へ/⺩ = 瑩
- - ま/石 + へ/⺩ = 璧
- - め/目 + へ/⺩ = 璽
- - ち/竹 + 龸 + へ/⺩ = 筺
- - も/門 + う/宀/#3 + へ/⺩ = 閠

==== Compounds of 冊 and 册 ====
- - 仁/亻 + へ/⺩ = 偏
- - い/糹/#2 + へ/⺩ = 編
- - ひ/辶 + へ/⺩ = 遍
- - へ/⺩ + 仁/亻 = 嗣
- - ぬ/力 + 宿 + へ/⺩ = 刪
- - と/戸 + 宿 + へ/⺩ = 扁
- - き/木 + 宿 + へ/⺩ = 柵
- - へ/⺩ + 宿 + へ/⺩ = 珊
- - ち/竹 + 宿 + へ/⺩ = 篇
- - へ/⺩ + む/車 + selector 2 = 翩
- - む/車 + 宿 + へ/⺩ = 蝙
- - ね/示 + 宿 + へ/⺩ = 褊
- - え/訁 + 宿 + へ/⺩ = 諞
- - み/耳 + 宿 + へ/⺩ = 跚
- - そ/馬 + 宿 + へ/⺩ = 騙

==== Compounds of 王 ====
- - り/分 + へ/⺩ = 全
  - - き/木 + り/分 + へ/⺩ = 栓
  - - や/疒 + り/分 + へ/⺩ = 痊
  - - ち/竹 + り/分 + へ/⺩ = 筌
  - - か/金 + り/分 + へ/⺩ = 銓
- - れ/口 + へ/⺩ = 呈
  - - の/禾 + へ/⺩ = 程
  - - ひ/辶 + れ/口 + へ/⺩ = 逞
  - - さ/阝 + れ/口 + へ/⺩ = 郢
  - - せ/食 + れ/口 + へ/⺩ = 酲
- - 宿 + へ/⺩ = 害
  - - め/目 + 宿 + へ/⺩ = 瞎
  - - む/車 + へ/⺩ = 轄
- - は/辶 + へ/⺩ = 廷
  - - よ/广 + へ/⺩ = 庭
  - - て/扌 + は/辶 + へ/⺩ = 挺
  - - き/木 + は/辶 + へ/⺩ = 梃
  - - ち/竹 + は/辶 + へ/⺩ = 霆
  - - ふ/女 + へ/⺩ = 艇
- - 氷/氵 + へ/⺩ = 潤
- - け/犬 + へ/⺩ = 狂
  - - え/訁 + け/犬 + へ/⺩ = 誑
- - へ/⺩ + へ/⺩ = 琴
- - 日 + へ/⺩ = 皇
  - - む/車 + 日 + へ/⺩ = 凰
  - - ゆ/彳 + 日 + へ/⺩ = 徨
  - - る/忄 + 日 + へ/⺩ = 惶
  - - に/氵 + 日 + へ/⺩ = 湟
  - - 火 + 日 + へ/⺩ = 煌
  - - ち/竹 + 日 + へ/⺩ = 篁
  - - ひ/辶 + 日 + へ/⺩ = 遑
  - - か/金 + 日 + へ/⺩ = 鍠
  - - さ/阝 + 日 + へ/⺩ = 隍
  - - せ/食 + 日 + へ/⺩ = 鰉
- - え/訁 + へ/⺩ = 註
- - も/門 + へ/⺩ = 閏
- - へ/⺩ + と/戸 = 弄
  - - れ/口 + へ/⺩ + と/戸 = 哢
- - へ/⺩ + 龸 = 斑
- - へ/⺩ + は/辶 = 毒
  - - ゐ/幺 + へ/⺩ + は/辶 = 纛
- - へ/⺩ + 宿 = 玩
- - へ/⺩ + ろ/十 = 玲
- - へ/⺩ + う/宀/#3 = 珍
- - へ/⺩ + か/金 = 珠
- - へ/⺩ + ぬ/力 = 班
- - へ/⺩ + め/目 = 現
- - へ/⺩ + に/氵 = 球
  - - selector 4 + へ/⺩ + に/氵 = 毬
- - へ/⺩ + り/分 = 理
- - へ/⺩ + く/艹 = 琉
- - へ/⺩ + の/禾 = 瑞
- - へ/⺩ + 心 = 瑟
- - へ/⺩ + る/忄 = 環
- - へ/⺩ + ま/石 = 碧
- - へ/⺩ + ゐ/幺 = 素
- - へ/⺩ + ね/示 = 表
- - へ/⺩ + を/貝 = 責
  - - ぬ/力 + へ/⺩ + を/貝 = 勣
  - - れ/口 + へ/⺩ + を/貝 = 嘖
  - - ま/石 + へ/⺩ + を/貝 = 磧
  - - ち/竹 + へ/⺩ + を/貝 = 簀
  - - み/耳 + へ/⺩ + を/貝 = 蹟
- - へ/⺩ + さ/阝 = 邦
- - へ/⺩ + す/発 = 麦
  - - へ/⺩ + へ/⺩ + す/発 = 麥
  - - も/門 + へ/⺩ + す/発 = 麹
- - も/門 + へ/⺩ + selector 1 = 匡
  - - ち/竹 + へ/⺩ + selector 1 = 筐
- - て/扌 + へ/⺩ + selector 1 = 抂
- - 日 + へ/⺩ + selector 1 = 旺
- - き/木 + へ/⺩ + selector 1 = 枉
- - に/氵 + へ/⺩ + selector 1 = 汪
- - へ/⺩ + す/発 + selector 4 = 玖
- - へ/⺩ + 仁/亻 + 囗 = 玳
- - へ/⺩ + selector 4 + ひ/辶 = 玻
- - へ/⺩ + 日 + selector 1 = 珀
- - へ/⺩ + 比 + か/金 = 珂
- - へ/⺩ + ぬ/力 + れ/口 = 珈
- - へ/⺩ + 宿 + 龸 = 珎
- - へ/⺩ + す/発 + れ/口 = 珞
- - へ/⺩ + 宿 + み/耳 = 珥
- - へ/⺩ + 宿 + つ/土 = 珪
- - へ/⺩ + む/車 + し/巿 = 珮
- - へ/⺩ + う/宀/#3 + ふ/女 = 珱
- - へ/⺩ + ら/月 + れ/口 = 珸
- - へ/⺩ + 比 + や/疒 = 琅
- - へ/⺩ + そ/馬 + selector 3 = 琢
- - へ/⺩ + す/発 + selector 3 = 琥
- - へ/⺩ + selector 4 + 火 = 琲
- - へ/⺩ + き/木 + き/木 = 琳
- - へ/⺩ + 宿 + 比 = 琵
- - へ/⺩ + 宿 + ひ/辶 = 琶
- - へ/⺩ + に/氵 + こ/子 = 琺
- - へ/⺩ + 宿 + む/車 = 琿
- - へ/⺩ + 日 + め/目 = 瑁
- - へ/⺩ + 宿 + の/禾 = 瑕
- - へ/⺩ + 宿 + ち/竹 = 瑙
- - へ/⺩ + 宿 + ら/月 = 瑚
- - へ/⺩ + く/艹 + お/頁 = 瑛
- - へ/⺩ + selector 5 + ゆ/彳 = 瑜
- - へ/⺩ + ら/月 + た/⽥ = 瑠
- - へ/⺩ + 宿 + を/貝 = 瑣
- - へ/⺩ + 宿 + そ/馬 = 瑪
- - へ/⺩ + や/疒 + さ/阝 = 瑯
- - へ/⺩ + お/頁 + に/氵 = 瑰
- - へ/⺩ + そ/馬 + こ/子 = 瑳
- - へ/⺩ + 宿 + か/金 = 瑶
- - へ/⺩ + 宿 + き/木 = 瑾
- - へ/⺩ + selector 4 + い/糹/#2 = 璃
- - へ/⺩ + ま/石 + ろ/十 = 璋
- - へ/⺩ + 宿 + な/亻 = 璞
- - へ/⺩ + 宿 + た/⽥ = 璢
- - へ/⺩ + お/頁 + す/発 = 瓊
- - へ/⺩ + ま/石 + 心 = 瓏
- - へ/⺩ + ふ/女 + を/貝 = 瓔
- - む/車 + 龸 + へ/⺩ = 蝗

==== Compounds of 将 and 爿 ====
- - へ/⺩ + へ/⺩ + selector 2 = 將
  - - に/氵 + へ/⺩ + selector 2 = 漿
  - - か/金 + へ/⺩ + selector 2 = 鏘
- - つ/土 + へ/⺩ = 埒
  - - つ/土 + つ/土 + へ/⺩ = 埓
- - へ/⺩ + つ/土 = 壮
  - - く/艹 + へ/⺩ = 荘
    - - く/艹 + く/艹 + へ/⺩ = 莊
  - - へ/⺩ + へ/⺩ + つ/土 = 壯
    - - け/犬 + へ/⺩ + つ/土 = 奘
    - - と/戸 + へ/⺩ + つ/土 = 弉
- - へ/⺩ + 比 = 奨
  - - へ/⺩ + へ/⺩ + 比 = 奬
  - - selector 4 + へ/⺩ + 比 = 獎
- - へ/⺩ + 囗 = 牆
- - へ/⺩ + け/犬 = 状
- - 心 + へ/⺩ + selector 2 = 蒋
- - せ/食 + へ/⺩ + selector 2 = 醤
- - へ/⺩ + 宿 + ふ/女 = 妝
- - へ/⺩ + 宿 + す/発 = 臧

==== Compounds of 主 ====
- - な/亻 + へ/⺩ = 住
- - ゆ/彳 + へ/⺩ = 往
- - き/木 + へ/⺩ = 柱
- - に/氵 + へ/⺩ = 注
- - み/耳 + へ/⺩ = 聖
  - - む/車 + み/耳 + へ/⺩ = 蟶
- - そ/馬 + へ/⺩ = 駐
- - へ/⺩ + そ/馬 + 比 = 麈

==== Compounds of 片 ====
- - へ/⺩ + ん/止 = 版
- - へ/⺩ + た/⽥ = 牌
- - へ/⺩ + 宿 + 囗 = 牋
- - へ/⺩ + 宿 + よ/广 = 牒
- - へ/⺩ + つ/土 + を/貝 = 牘

==== Compounds of 丙 ====
- - 火 + 数 + へ/⺩ = 炳
- - さ/阝 + 数 + へ/⺩ = 陋
- - と/戸 + 数 + へ/⺩ = 鞆

==== Compounds of 出 ====
- - と/戸 + へ/⺩ = 屈
  - - な/亻 + と/戸 + へ/⺩ = 倔
  - - や/疒 + と/戸 + へ/⺩ = 崛
  - - う/宀/#3 + と/戸 + へ/⺩ = 窟
- - て/扌 + へ/⺩ = 拙
- - れ/口 + 比 + へ/⺩ = 咄
- - ら/月 + 比 + へ/⺩ = 朏
- - き/木 + 比 + へ/⺩ = 柮
- - ね/示 + 比 + へ/⺩ = 祟
- - の/禾 + 比 + へ/⺩ = 糶
- - し/巿 + 比 + へ/⺩ = 黜

==== Other compounds ====
- - へ/⺩ + し/巿 = 寿
  - - へ/⺩ + へ/⺩ + し/巿 = 壽
    - - な/亻 + へ/⺩ + し/巿 = 儔
    - - へ/⺩ + へ/⺩ + し/巿 = 壽
    - - て/扌 + へ/⺩ + し/巿 = 擣
    - - 氷/氵 + へ/⺩ + し/巿 = 濤
    - - た/⽥ + へ/⺩ + し/巿 = 疇
      - - た/⽥ + 宿 + へ/⺩ = 畴
    - - ち/竹 + へ/⺩ + し/巿 = 籌
    - - み/耳 + へ/⺩ + し/巿 = 躊
  - - ね/示 + へ/⺩ = 祷
  - - き/木 + へ/⺩ + し/巿 = 梼
    - - き/木 + 龸 + へ/⺩ = 檮
  - - に/氵 + へ/⺩ + し/巿 = 涛
  - - さ/阝 + へ/⺩ + し/巿 = 陦
- - へ/⺩ + ゑ/訁 = 収
  - - へ/⺩ + へ/⺩ + ゑ/訁 = 收
- - へ/⺩ + き/木 = 妃
- - つ/土 + 宿 + へ/⺩ = 塀
