= Braille pattern dots-16 =

Braille pattern

6-dot braille cells
⠀	⠁	⠃	⠉	⠙	⠑	⠋	⠛	⠓	⠊	⠚	⠈	⠘
⠄	⠅	⠇	⠍	⠝	⠕	⠏	⠟	⠗	⠎	⠞	⠌	⠜
⠤	⠥	⠧	⠭	⠽	⠵	⠯	⠿	⠷	⠮	⠾	⠬	⠼
⠠	⠡	⠣	⠩	⠹	⠱	⠫	⠻	⠳	⠪	⠺	⠨	⠸
shift down	⠂	⠆	⠒	⠲	⠢	⠖	⠶	⠦	⠔	⠴	⠐	⠰

The Braille pattern dots-16 ( ⠡ ) is a 6-dot braille cell with the top left and bottom right dots raised, or an 8-dot braille cell with the top left and lower-middle right dots raised. It is represented by the Unicode code point U+2821, and in Braille ASCII with the asterisk: *.

Character information
Preview	⠡ (braille pattern dots-16)	
Unicode name	BRAILLE PATTERN DOTS-16	
Encodings	decimal	hex
Unicode	10273	U+2821
UTF-8	226 160 161	E2 A0 A1
Numeric character reference	&#10273;	&#x2821;
Braille ASCII	42	2A

== Unified Braille ==
In unified international braille, the braille pattern dots-16 is used to represent the unvoiced alveolar or palatal affricate, such as /tʃ/ or /tɕ/, or otherwise as needed.

=== Table of unified braille values ===
French Braille	Â, mathematical 1, fr, -ation, "tout"
English Braille	Ch
English Contraction	child
German Braille	Au
Bharati Braille	छ / ਛ / છ / ছ / ଛ / ఛ / ಛ / ഛ / ඡ / چھ
Icelandic Braille	Á
IPA Braille	/ɑ/
Russian Braille	Ё
Slovak Braille	Á
Arabic Braille	ة
Irish Braille	Ch
Thai Braille	◌า ā
Luxembourgish Braille	1 (one)
Romanian Braille	ă

== Other braille ==
Japanese Braille	ka / か / カ
Korean Braille	yeon / 연
Mainland Chinese Braille	ying, -ing
Taiwanese Braille	yi, -i / ㄧ
Two-Cell Chinese Braille	gu- -én
Nemeth Braille	· (multiplication dot)
Algerian Braille	ة

== Plus dots 7 and 8 ==
Related to Braille pattern dots-16 are Braille patterns 167, 168, and 1678, which are used in 8-dot braille systems, such as Gardner-Salinas and Luxembourgish Braille.

Character information
Preview	⡡ (braille pattern dots-167)		⢡ (braille pattern dots-168)		⣡ (braille pattern dots-1678)	
Unicode name	BRAILLE PATTERN DOTS-167		BRAILLE PATTERN DOTS-168		BRAILLE PATTERN DOTS-1678	
Encodings	decimal	hex	dec	hex	dec	hex
Unicode	10337	U+2861	10401	U+28A1	10465	U+28E1
UTF-8	226 161 161	E2 A1 A1	226 162 161	E2 A2 A1	226 163 161	E2 A3 A1
Numeric character reference	&#10337;	&#x2861;	&#10401;	&#x28A1;	&#10465;	&#x28E1;

	dots 167	dots 168	dots 1678
Gardner Salinas Braille		variant modifier	\ (backslash)

== Related 8-dot kantenji patterns ==
In the Japanese kantenji braille, the standard 8-dot Braille patterns 28, 128, 248, and 1248 are the patterns related to Braille pattern dots-16, since the two additional dots of kantenji patterns 016, 167, and 0167 are placed above the base 6-dot cell, instead of below, as in standard 8-dot braille.

Character information
Preview	⢂ (braille pattern dots-28)		⢃ (braille pattern dots-128)		⢊ (braille pattern dots-248)		⢋ (braille pattern dots-1248)	
Unicode name	BRAILLE PATTERN DOTS-28		BRAILLE PATTERN DOTS-128		BRAILLE PATTERN DOTS-248		BRAILLE PATTERN DOTS-1248	
Encodings	decimal	hex	dec	hex	dec	hex	dec	hex
Unicode	10370	U+2882	10371	U+2883	10378	U+288A	10379	U+288B
UTF-8	226 162 130	E2 A2 82	226 162 131	E2 A2 83	226 162 138	E2 A2 8A	226 162 139	E2 A2 8B
Numeric character reference	&#10370;	&#x2882;	&#10371;	&#x2883;	&#10378;	&#x288A;	&#10379;	&#x288B;

=== Kantenji using braille patterns 28, 128, 248, or 1248 ===
This listing includes kantenji using Braille pattern dots-16 for all 6349 kanji found in JIS C 6226-1978.

- - 金

==== Variants and thematic compounds ====
- - selector 1 + か/金 = 于
- - selector 3 + か/金 = 咼
- - selector 4 + か/金 = 干
- - selector 5 + か/金 = 朱
- - selector 6 + か/金 = 瓦
- - か/金 + selector 1 = 川
- - か/金 + selector 4 = 州
- - か/金 + selector 5 = 鈎
- - か/金 + selector 6 = 鉢
- - 比 + か/金 = 可
- - し/巿 + か/金 = 赤

==== Compounds of 金 ====
- - ん/止 + か/金 = 欽
- - か/金 + て/扌 = 釘
- - か/金 + ち/竹 = 釜
- - か/金 + ろ/十 = 針
- - か/金 + も/門 = 釣
- - か/金 + ふ/女 = 鈍
- - か/金 + 日 = 鈴
- - か/金 + け/犬 = 鉄
  - - か/金 + か/金 + け/犬 = 鐵
- - か/金 + え/訁 = 鉛
- - か/金 + こ/子 = 鉱
  - - か/金 + か/金 + こ/子 = 鑛
- - か/金 + む/車 = 鉾
- - か/金 + や/疒 = 銀
- - か/金 + 龸 = 銃
- - か/金 + と/戸 = 銅
- - か/金 + つ/土 = 銑
- - か/金 + れ/口 = 銘
- - か/金 + 囗 = 銭
  - - か/金 + か/金 + 囗 = 錢
- - か/金 + ほ/方 = 鋒
- - か/金 + 宿 = 鋭
- - か/金 + し/巿 = 鋳
  - - か/金 + か/金 + し/巿 = 鑄
- - か/金 + ゆ/彳 = 鋼
- - か/金 + せ/食 = 錆
- - か/金 + い/糹/#2 = 錐
- - か/金 + に/氵 = 錘
- - か/金 + よ/广 = 錠
- - か/金 + く/艹 = 錨
- - か/金 + 数 = 錫
- - か/金 + ひ/辶 = 錬
- - か/金 + ね/示 = 錯
- - か/金 + み/耳 = 録
- - か/金 + の/禾 = 鍛
- - か/金 + は/辶 = 鍵
- - か/金 + ま/石 = 鎌
- - か/金 + を/貝 = 鎖
- - か/金 + め/目 = 鎮
  - - か/金 + か/金 + め/目 = 鎭
- - か/金 + な/亻 = 鏡
- - か/金 + り/分 = 鐘
- - か/金 + ⺼ = 鑑
  - - か/金 + か/金 + ⺼ = 鑒
- - か/金 + 宿 + ぬ/力 = 劉
- - れ/口 + 宿 + か/金 = 嚠
- - や/疒 + 宿 + か/金 = 崟
- - 氷/氵 + 宿 + か/金 = 淦
- - に/氵 + 龸 + か/金 = 瀏
- - か/金 + selector 4 + ぬ/力 = 釖
- - か/金 + 龸 + ぬ/力 = 釛
- - か/金 + 数 + り/分 = 釟
- - か/金 + 宿 + ち/竹 = 釡
- - か/金 + 宿 + れ/口 = 釦
- - か/金 + selector 1 + ゑ/訁 = 釵
- - か/金 + selector 4 + ち/竹 = 釶
- - か/金 + selector 1 + ぬ/力 = 釼
- - か/金 + 比 + を/貝 = 釿
- - か/金 + は/辶 + ん/止 = 鈑
- - か/金 + ほ/方 + そ/馬 = 鈔
- - か/金 + selector 6 + そ/馬 = 鈕
- - か/金 + 宿 + も/門 = 鈞
- - か/金 + 宿 + と/戸 = 鈩
- - か/金 + 比 + た/⽥ = 鈬
- - か/金 + れ/口 + ろ/十 = 鈷
- - か/金 + 龸 + た/⽥ = 鈿
- - か/金 + selector 1 + す/発 = 鉅
- - か/金 + 宿 + ひ/辶 = 鉈
- - か/金 + 龸 + ゐ/幺 = 鉉
- - か/金 + 龸 + ま/石 = 鉐
- - か/金 + selector 4 + る/忄 = 鉗
- - か/金 + 宿 + さ/阝 = 鉚
- - か/金 + 龸 + ひ/辶 = 鉞
- - か/金 + ん/止 + い/糹/#2 = 鉦
- - か/金 + り/分 + へ/⺩ = 銓
- - か/金 + ゆ/彳 + な/亻 = 銕
- - か/金 + 数 + 宿 = 銚
- - か/金 + れ/口 + せ/食 = 銛
- - か/金 + 龸 + ゆ/彳 = 銜
- - か/金 + そ/馬 + ⺼ = 銷
- - か/金 + の/禾 + ゐ/幺 = 銹
- - か/金 + 宿 + な/亻 = 鋏
- - か/金 + ぬ/力 + そ/馬 = 鋤
- - か/金 + selector 5 + ほ/方 = 鋩
- - か/金 + 宿 + ほ/方 = 鋪
- - か/金 + く/艹 + り/分 = 鋲
- - か/金 + と/戸 + selector 1 = 鋸
- - か/金 + 宿 + う/宀/#3 = 鋺
- - か/金 + selector 1 + selector 1 = 錏
- - か/金 + ら/月 + た/⽥ = 錙
- - か/金 + そ/馬 + 宿 = 錚
- - か/金 + 宿 + ゑ/訁 = 錣
- - か/金 + 宿 + め/目 = 錦
- - か/金 + 囗 + ろ/十 = 錮
- - か/金 + く/艹 + 比 = 錵
- - か/金 + く/艹 + ほ/方 = 錺
- - か/金 + 囗 + ん/止 = 錻
- - か/金 + 龸 + れ/口 = 鍄
- - か/金 + 宿 + か/金 = 鍋
- - か/金 + よ/广 + ゑ/訁 = 鍍
- - か/金 + 宿 + け/犬 = 鍔
- - か/金 + selector 1 + き/木 = 鍖
- - か/金 + 龸 + の/禾 = 鍜
- - か/金 + 日 + へ/⺩ = 鍠
- - か/金 + の/禾 + 火 = 鍬
- - か/金 + 宿 + ゆ/彳 = 鍮
- - か/金 + ひ/辶 + selector 3 = 鍼
- - か/金 + 龸 + り/分 = 鍾
- - か/金 + う/宀/#3 + た/⽥ = 鎔
- - か/金 + り/分 + お/頁 = 鎗
- - か/金 + ひ/辶 + ら/月 = 鎚
- - か/金 + 宿 + や/疒 = 鎧
- - か/金 + 比 + え/訁 = 鎬
- - か/金 + り/分 + ⺼ = 鎰
- - か/金 + ひ/辶 + け/犬 = 鎹
- - か/金 + ほ/方 + や/疒 = 鏃
- - か/金 + ひ/辶 + む/車 = 鏈
- - か/金 + む/車 + selector 2 = 鏐
- - か/金 + 宿 + お/頁 = 鏑
- - か/金 + そ/馬 + 比 = 鏖
- - か/金 + つ/土 + す/発 = 鏗
- - か/金 + へ/⺩ + selector 2 = 鏘
- - か/金 + 宿 + ま/石 = 鏝
- - か/金 + 宿 + る/忄 = 鏤
- - か/金 + 宿 + 宿 = 鏥
- - か/金 + む/車 + を/貝 = 鏨
- - か/金 + 宿 + つ/土 = 鐃
- - か/金 + の/禾 + た/⽥ = 鐇
- - か/金 + 宿 + ろ/十 = 鐐
- - か/金 + 宿 + 氷/氵 = 鐓
- - か/金 + 日 + ろ/十 = 鐔
- - か/金 + す/発 + と/戸 = 鐙
- - か/金 + selector 1 + 心 = 鐚
- - か/金 + う/宀/#3 + け/犬 = 鐡
- - か/金 + 宿 + い/糹/#2 = 鐫
- - か/金 + 龸 + る/忄 = 鐶
- - か/金 + 宿 + た/⽥ = 鐸
- - か/金 + 龸 + ふ/女 = 鐺
- - か/金 + す/発 + selector 4 = 鑁
- - か/金 + は/辶 + ら/月 = 鑓
- - か/金 + を/貝 + け/犬 = 鑚
- - か/金 + 龸 + ろ/十 = 鑞
- - か/金 + 日 + ゐ/幺 = 鑠
- - か/金 + す/発 + 心 = 鑢
- - か/金 + 宿 + す/発 = 鑪
- - か/金 + 宿 + り/分 = 鑰
- - か/金 + 龸 + け/犬 = 鑵
- - か/金 + 宿 + み/耳 = 鑷
- - か/金 + す/発 + い/糹/#2 = 鑼
- - か/金 + 宿 + を/貝 = 鑽
- - か/金 + 宿 + え/訁 = 鑾
- - か/金 + 宿 + の/禾 = 鑿
- - か/金 + め/目 + め/目 = 钁

==== Compounds of 于 ====
- - 宿 + か/金 = 宇
- - い/糹/#2 + か/金 = 紆
- - 心 + か/金 = 芋
- - れ/口 + selector 1 + か/金 = 吁
- - か/金 + 宿 + ⺼ = 盂
- - は/辶 + 宿 + か/金 = 迂

==== Compounds of 咼 ====
- - ね/示 + か/金 = 禍
- - ひ/辶 + か/金 = 過
- - か/金 + ら/月 = 骨
  - - か/金 + ゐ/幺 = 骸
  - - 心 + か/金 + ら/月 = 榾
  - - け/犬 + か/金 + ら/月 = 猾
  - - ま/石 + か/金 + ら/月 = 磆
  - - か/金 + か/金 + ら/月 = 骭
  - - の/禾 + か/金 + ら/月 = 骰
  - - 数 + か/金 + ら/月 = 髏
  - - む/車 + か/金 + ら/月 = 髑
  - - か/金 + か/金 + ら/月 = 骭
- - つ/土 + 宿 + か/金 = 堝
- - に/氵 + 宿 + か/金 = 渦
- - か/金 + う/宀/#3 + り/分 = 窩
- - 心 + 宿 + か/金 = 萵
- - む/車 + 宿 + か/金 = 蝸
- - か/金 + す/発 + れ/口 = 骼
- - か/金 + た/⽥ + さ/阝 = 髀
- - か/金 + 宿 + せ/食 = 鶻

==== Compounds of 干 ====
- - ふ/女 + か/金 = 奸
- - や/疒 + か/金 = 岸
- - り/分 + か/金 = 平
  - - や/疒 + り/分 + か/金 = 岼
  - - る/忄 + り/分 + か/金 = 怦
  - - に/氵 + り/分 + か/金 = 泙
    - - く/艹 + り/分 + か/金 = 萍
  - - の/禾 + り/分 + か/金 = 秤
  - - 心 + り/分 + か/金 = 苹
  - - せ/食 + り/分 + か/金 = 鮃
- - ろ/十 + か/金 = 幹
  - - に/氵 + ろ/十 + か/金 = 澣
- - 氷/氵 + か/金 = 汗
- - ち/竹 + か/金 = 竿
- - ⺼ + か/金 = 肝
- - む/車 + か/金 = 軒
- - か/金 + ぬ/力 = 刊
- - 日 + selector 4 + か/金 = 旱
  - - る/忄 + か/金 = 悍
  - - て/扌 + selector 4 + か/金 = 捍
  - - の/禾 + selector 4 + か/金 = 稈
- - て/扌 + 宿 + か/金 = 扞
- - き/木 + 宿 + か/金 = 杆
- - き/木 + selector 4 + か/金 = 栞
- - き/木 + う/宀/#3 + か/金 = 桿
- - す/発 + selector 4 + か/金 = 罕
- - え/訁 + 宿 + か/金 = 訐
- - そ/馬 + 宿 + か/金 = 駻
- - か/金 + め/目 + た/⽥ = 鼾

==== Compounds of 朱 ====
- - き/木 + か/金 = 株
- - ほ/方 + か/金 = 殊
- - へ/⺩ + か/金 = 珠
- - な/亻 + selector 5 + か/金 = 侏
- - に/氵 + selector 5 + か/金 = 洙
- - 心 + selector 5 + か/金 = 茱
- - む/車 + selector 5 + か/金 = 蛛
- - え/訁 + selector 5 + か/金 = 誅
- - か/金 + selector 5 + か/金 = 銖

==== Compounds of 瓦 ====
- - と/戸 + か/金 = 瓶
- - か/金 + お/頁 = 瓩
- - の/禾 + selector 6 + か/金 = 甃
- - も/門 + selector 6 + か/金 = 甌
- - う/宀/#3 + selector 6 + か/金 = 甍
- - そ/馬 + selector 6 + か/金 = 甑
- - ま/石 + selector 6 + か/金 = 甓
- - ひ/辶 + selector 6 + か/金 = 甕
- - か/金 + う/宀/#3 + ろ/十 = 瓧
- - か/金 + selector 6 + こ/子 = 瓮
- - か/金 + う/宀/#3 + 日 = 瓰
- - か/金 + selector 4 + せ/食 = 瓱
- - か/金 + 比 + ふ/女 = 瓲
- - か/金 + 氷/氵 + ん/止 = 瓷
- - か/金 + 数 + め/目 = 瓸
- - か/金 + 比 + に/氵 = 甄
- - か/金 + よ/广 + り/分 = 甅
- - か/金 + selector 4 + て/扌 = 甎

==== Compounds of 川 ====
- - か/金 + 宿 + selector 1 = 巛
- - は/辶 + か/金 = 巡
- - ゑ/訁 + か/金 = 訓
- - お/頁 + か/金 = 順
- - か/金 + 火 = 災
- - か/金 + た/⽥ = 拶
- - か/金 + か/金 + selector 1 = 釧
- - か/金 + き/木 = 巣
  - - ね/示 + か/金 + き/木 = 剿
  - - ぬ/力 + か/金 + き/木 = 勦
  - - き/木 + か/金 + き/木 = 樔

==== Compounds of 州 ====
- - せ/食 + か/金 = 酬
- - に/氵 + か/金 + selector 4 = 洲
- - そ/馬 + か/金 + selector 4 = 駲

==== Compounds of 鈎 ====
- - か/金 + も/門 + selector 5 = 鉤
  - - か/金 + も/門 + selector 2 = 鉋

==== Compounds of 可 ====
- - な/亻 + か/金 = 何
- - 囗 + か/金 = 呵
- - け/犬 + か/金 = 奇
  - - う/宀/#3 + か/金 = 寄
  - - そ/馬 + か/金 = 騎
  - - な/亻 + け/犬 + か/金 = 倚
  - - ぬ/力 + け/犬 + か/金 = 剞
  - - て/扌 + け/犬 + か/金 = 掎
  - - ん/止 + け/犬 + か/金 = 欹
  - - け/犬 + け/犬 + か/金 = 猗
  - - た/⽥ + け/犬 + か/金 = 畸
  - - selector 1 + け/犬 + か/金 = 竒
  - - い/糹/#2 + け/犬 + か/金 = 綺
  - - す/発 + け/犬 + か/金 = 羇
- - に/氵 + か/金 = 河
- - さ/阝 + か/金 = 阿
  - - ふ/女 + さ/阝 + か/金 = 婀
  - - や/疒 + さ/阝 + か/金 = 痾
- - か/金 + 比 + か/金 = 哥
  - - か/金 + ん/止 = 歌
  - - ゆ/彳 + 比 + か/金 = 彁
  - - え/訁 + か/金 + ん/止 = 謌
- - き/木 + 比 + か/金 = 柯
- - に/氵 + 比 + か/金 = 渮
- - へ/⺩ + 比 + か/金 = 珂
- - ふ/女 + 比 + か/金 = 舸
- - く/艹 + 比 + か/金 = 苛
- - え/訁 + 比 + か/金 = 訶
- - む/車 + 比 + か/金 = 軻

==== Compounds of 赤 ====
- - か/金 + か/金 = 赫
  - - れ/口 + か/金 = 嚇
- - か/金 + 氷/氵 = 赦
  - - む/車 + か/金 + 氷/氵 = 螫
- - お/頁 + し/巿 + か/金 = 赧
- - か/金 + と/戸 + 日 = 赭

==== Other compounds ====
- - て/扌 + か/金 = 揺
  - - て/扌 + て/扌 + か/金 = 搖
- - え/訁 + か/金 = 謡
  - - え/訁 + え/訁 + か/金 = 謠
- - ゆ/彳 + 龸 + か/金 = 徭
- - へ/⺩ + 宿 + か/金 = 瑶
- - ひ/辶 + 宿 + か/金 = 遥
- - か/金 + 龸 + せ/食 = 鷂
- - た/⽥ + か/金 = 畢
  - - み/耳 + た/⽥ + か/金 = 蹕
- - く/艹 + か/金 = 華
  - - れ/口 + く/艹 + か/金 = 嘩
  - - 日 + く/艹 + か/金 = 曄
  - - 心 + く/艹 + か/金 = 樺
  - - え/訁 + く/艹 + か/金 = 譁
- - や/疒 + う/宀/#3 + か/金 = 崋
- - 日 + か/金 = 年
- - つ/土 + か/金 = 幸
  - - な/亻 + つ/土 + か/金 = 倖
  - - 囗 + つ/土 + か/金 = 圉
  - - す/発 + つ/土 + か/金 = 睾
- - す/発 + か/金 = 虐
  - - や/疒 + す/発 + か/金 = 瘧
  - - え/訁 + す/発 + か/金 = 謔
- - ら/月 + か/金 = 勝
- - め/目 + か/金 = 看
- - の/禾 + か/金 = 糧
- - て/扌 + ら/月 + か/金 = 捷
