= Braille pattern dots-1236 =

Braille pattern

6-dot braille cells
⠀	⠁	⠃	⠉	⠙	⠑	⠋	⠛	⠓	⠊	⠚	⠈	⠘
⠄	⠅	⠇	⠍	⠝	⠕	⠏	⠟	⠗	⠎	⠞	⠌	⠜
⠤	⠥	⠧	⠭	⠽	⠵	⠯	⠿	⠷	⠮	⠾	⠬	⠼
⠠	⠡	⠣	⠩	⠹	⠱	⠫	⠻	⠳	⠪	⠺	⠨	⠸
shift down	⠂	⠆	⠒	⠲	⠢	⠖	⠶	⠦	⠔	⠴	⠐	⠰

The Braille pattern dots-1236 ( ⠧ ) is a 6-dot braille cell with the bottom right and all left-side dots raised, or an 8-dot braille cell with the top, upper-middle, and lower-middle left dots; and lower-middle right dot raised. It is represented by the Unicode code point U+2827, and in Braille ASCII with V.

Character information
Preview	⠧ (braille pattern dots-1236)	
Unicode name	BRAILLE PATTERN DOTS-1236	
Encodings	decimal	hex
Unicode	10279	U+2827
UTF-8	226 160 167	E2 A0 A7
Numeric character reference	&#10279;	&#x2827;
Braille ASCII	86	56

== Unified Braille ==
In unified international braille, the braille pattern dots-1236 is used to represent a voiced labial plosive or labio-velar approximant, such as /v/, /β/, or /w/, and otherwise as needed.

=== Table of unified braille values ===
French Braille	V, "vous"
English Braille	V
English Contraction	very
German Braille	V
Bharati Braille	व / ਵ / વ / ৱ / ୱ / ଵ / వ / ವ / വ / வ / ව / و
Icelandic Braille	V
IPA Braille	/v/
Russian Braille	В
Slovak Braille	V
Arabic Braille	ﻻ
Irish Braille	V
Thai Braille	บ b
Luxembourgish Braille	v (minuscule)

== Other braille ==
Japanese Braille	hi / ひ / ヒ
Korean Braille	wa / ㅘ
Mainland Chinese Braille	an
Taiwanese Braille	an / ㄢ
Two-Cell Chinese Braille	lu- -ǐ/-ǔ/-ǚ
Algerian Braille	ك

== Plus dots 7 and 8 ==
Related to Braille pattern dots-1236 are Braille patterns 12367, 12368, and 123678, which are used in 8-dot braille systems, such as Gardner-Salinas and Luxembourgish Braille.

Character information
Preview	⡧ (braille pattern dots-12367)		⢧ (braille pattern dots-12368)		⣧ (braille pattern dots-123678)	
Unicode name	BRAILLE PATTERN DOTS-12367		BRAILLE PATTERN DOTS-12368		BRAILLE PATTERN DOTS-123678	
Encodings	decimal	hex	dec	hex	dec	hex
Unicode	10343	U+2867	10407	U+28A7	10471	U+28E7
UTF-8	226 161 167	E2 A1 A7	226 162 167	E2 A2 A7	226 163 167	E2 A3 A7
Numeric character reference	&#10343;	&#x2867;	&#10407;	&#x28A7;	&#10471;	&#x28E7;

	dots 12367	dots 12368	dots 123678
Gardner Salinas Braille	V (capital)		open displayed equation
Luxembourgish Braille	V (capital)		

== Related 8-dot kantenji patterns ==
In the Japanese kantenji braille, the standard 8-dot Braille patterns 2378, 12378, 23478, and 123478 are the patterns related to Braille pattern dots-1236, since the two additional dots of kantenji patterns 01236, 12367, and 012367 are placed above the base 6-dot cell, instead of below, as in standard 8-dot braille.

Character information
Preview	⣆ (braille pattern dots-2378)		⣇ (braille pattern dots-12378)		⣎ (braille pattern dots-23478)		⣏ (braille pattern dots-123478)	
Unicode name	BRAILLE PATTERN DOTS-2378		BRAILLE PATTERN DOTS-12378		BRAILLE PATTERN DOTS-23478		BRAILLE PATTERN DOTS-123478	
Encodings	decimal	hex	dec	hex	dec	hex	dec	hex
Unicode	10438	U+28C6	10439	U+28C7	10446	U+28CE	10447	U+28CF
UTF-8	226 163 134	E2 A3 86	226 163 135	E2 A3 87	226 163 142	E2 A3 8E	226 163 143	E2 A3 8F
Numeric character reference	&#10438;	&#x28C6;	&#10439;	&#x28C7;	&#10446;	&#x28CE;	&#10447;	&#x28CF;

=== Kantenji using braille patterns 2378, 12378, 23478, or 123478 ===
This listing includes kantenji using Braille pattern dots-1236 for all 6349 kanji found in JIS C 6226-1978.

- - 進

==== Variants and thematic compounds ====
- - selector 1 + ひ/辶 = 雍
- - selector 2 + ひ/辶 = 匕
- - selector 3 + ひ/辶 = 戌
- - selector 4 + ひ/辶 = 皮
- - selector 5 + ひ/辶 = 巴
- - selector 6 + ひ/辶 = 戍
- - ひ/辶 + selector 3 = 咸
- - ひ/辶 + selector 4 = 道
- - 比 + ひ/辶 = 東
  - - selector 6 + selector 6 + ひ/辶 = 柬
- - 数 + ひ/辶 = 戊

==== Compounds of 進 and 辶 ====
- - ひ/辶 + ぬ/力 = 辺
  - - ひ/辶 + ぬ/力 + 囗 = 迢
  - - ひ/辶 + ひ/辶 + ぬ/力 = 邊
- - ひ/辶 + ろ/十 = 辻
- - ひ/辶 + な/亻 = 込
- - ひ/辶 + 龸 = 迄
- - ひ/辶 + さ/阝 = 迎
- - ひ/辶 + を/貝 = 近
- - ひ/辶 + ん/止 = 返
- - ひ/辶 + 日 = 迫
  - - ひ/辶 + 日 + へ/⺩ = 遑
- - ひ/辶 + の/禾 = 迷
  - - え/訁 + ひ/辶 + の/禾 = 謎
- - ひ/辶 + ら/月 = 追
  - - き/木 + ひ/辶 = 槌
  - - か/金 + ひ/辶 + ら/月 = 鎚
- - ひ/辶 + や/疒 = 退
  - - ⺼ + ひ/辶 + や/疒 = 腿
  - - ね/示 + ひ/辶 + や/疒 = 褪
- - ひ/辶 + け/犬 = 送
  - - か/金 + ひ/辶 + け/犬 = 鎹
- - ひ/辶 + 宿 = 逃
- - ひ/辶 + は/辶 = 逆
- - ひ/辶 + ゐ/幺 = 透
- - ひ/辶 + す/発 = 逓
- - ひ/辶 + も/門 = 途
- - ひ/辶 + ゑ/訁 = 這
- - ひ/辶 + て/扌 = 逝
- - ひ/辶 + 数 = 速
- - ひ/辶 + ほ/方 = 逢
  - - ち/竹 + ひ/辶 + ほ/方 = 篷
- - ひ/辶 + む/車 = 連
  - - 心 + ひ/辶 = 蓮
  - - れ/口 + ひ/辶 + む/車 = 嗹
  - - に/氵 + ひ/辶 + む/車 = 漣
  - - い/糹/#2 + ひ/辶 + む/車 = 縺
  - - か/金 + ひ/辶 + む/車 = 鏈
- - ひ/辶 + ゆ/彳 = 逮
  - - ち/竹 + ひ/辶 + ゆ/彳 = 靆
- - ひ/辶 + つ/土 = 週
- - ひ/辶 + め/目 = 遁
- - ひ/辶 + と/戸 = 遅
  - - ひ/辶 + ひ/辶 + と/戸 = 遲
- - ひ/辶 + く/艹 = 遇
- - ひ/辶 + へ/⺩ = 遍
- - ひ/辶 + か/金 = 過
- - ひ/辶 + た/⽥ = 達
  - - て/扌 + ひ/辶 + た/⽥ = 撻
  - - 火 + ひ/辶 + た/⽥ = 燵
  - - も/門 + ひ/辶 + た/⽥ = 闥
  - - と/戸 + ひ/辶 + た/⽥ = 韃
- - ひ/辶 + い/糹/#2 = 違
- - ひ/辶 + え/訁 = 遠
- - ひ/辶 + お/頁 = 適
- - ひ/辶 + そ/馬 = 遭
- - ひ/辶 + よ/广 = 遮
- - ひ/辶 + せ/食 = 遵
- - ひ/辶 + こ/子 = 選
- - ひ/辶 + き/木 = 遺
- - ひ/辶 + ま/石 = 避
- - ひ/辶 + 氷/氵 = 邀
- - ひ/辶 + る/忄 = 還
- - 日 + ひ/辶 + ひ/辶 = 暹
- - ひ/辶 + ひ/辶 + す/発 = 遞
- - ひ/辶 + 宿 + 宿 = 辷
- - ひ/辶 + 比 + 宿 = 迚
- - ひ/辶 + 囗 + こ/子 = 迥
- - ひ/辶 + ぬ/力 + れ/口 = 迦
- - ひ/辶 + 囗 + め/目 = 迩
- - ひ/辶 + た/⽥ + selector 4 = 迪
- - ひ/辶 + ほ/方 + と/戸 = 迯
- - ひ/辶 + 囗 + れ/口 = 迴
- - ひ/辶 + 宿 + と/戸 = 迸
- - ひ/辶 + 宿 + え/訁 = 迹
- - ひ/辶 + 比 + に/氵 = 迺
- - ひ/辶 + よ/广 + れ/口 = 逅
- - ひ/辶 + selector 6 + ほ/方 = 逋
- - ひ/辶 + そ/馬 + ⺼ = 逍
- - ひ/辶 + せ/食 + selector 3 = 逎
- - ひ/辶 + ろ/十 + に/氵 = 逑
- - ひ/辶 + 宿 + け/犬 = 逕
- - ひ/辶 + 宿 + 火 = 逖
- - ひ/辶 + selector 5 + と/戸 = 逗
- - ひ/辶 + れ/口 + へ/⺩ = 逞
- - ひ/辶 + う/宀/#3 + む/車 = 逡
- - ひ/辶 + た/⽥ + selector 1 = 逧
- - ひ/辶 + 龸 + む/車 = 逵
- - ひ/辶 + の/禾 + ふ/女 = 逶
- - ひ/辶 + 宿 + た/⽥ = 逹
- - ひ/辶 + 宿 + ふ/女 = 逼
- - ひ/辶 + 宿 + ゆ/彳 = 逾
- - ひ/辶 + を/貝 + と/戸 = 遉
- - ひ/辶 + 宿 + 氷/氵 = 遏
- - ひ/辶 + 宿 + の/禾 = 遐
- - ひ/辶 + せ/食 + selector 6 = 遒
- - ひ/辶 + 比 + み/耳 = 遖
- - ひ/辶 + selector 3 + む/車 = 遘
- - ひ/辶 + こ/子 + ゐ/幺 = 遜
- - ひ/辶 + ら/月 + は/辶 = 遡
- - ひ/辶 + 宿 + か/金 = 遥
- - ひ/辶 + selector 3 + ほ/方 = 遨
- - ひ/辶 + そ/馬 + selector 3 = 遯
- - ひ/辶 + 宿 + つ/土 = 遶
- - ひ/辶 + 宿 + ろ/十 = 遼
- - ひ/辶 + す/発 + そ/馬 = 遽
- - ひ/辶 + 囗 + そ/馬 = 邂
- - ひ/辶 + う/宀/#3 + り/分 = 邃
- - ひ/辶 + 宿 + 囗 = 邇
- - ひ/辶 + 宿 + ぬ/力 = 邉
- - ひ/辶 + す/発 + い/糹/#2 = 邏

==== Compounds of 雍 ====
- - て/扌 + ひ/辶 = 擁
- - つ/土 + 宿 + ひ/辶 = 壅
- - ひ/辶 + selector 6 + か/金 = 甕

==== Compounds of 匕 ====
- - れ/口 + ひ/辶 = 叱
- - 日 + 宿 + ひ/辶 = 匙
- - ひ/辶 + 日 + selector 1 = 皀
- - ひ/辶 + ん/止 + の/禾 = 齔
- - う/宀/#3 + 宿 + ひ/辶 = 它
  - - 仁/亻 + ひ/辶 = 佗
  - - む/車 + ひ/辶 = 蛇
  - - き/木 + 宿 + ひ/辶 = 柁
  - - に/氵 + 宿 + ひ/辶 = 沱
  - - ふ/女 + 宿 + ひ/辶 = 舵
  - - え/訁 + 宿 + ひ/辶 = 詑
  - - か/金 + 宿 + ひ/辶 = 鉈
  - - さ/阝 + 宿 + ひ/辶 = 陀
  - - そ/馬 + 宿 + ひ/辶 = 駝
  - - ひ/辶 + 龸 + せ/食 = 鴕

==== Compounds of 戌, 戍, 咸, and 戊 ====
- - す/発 + ひ/辶 = 蔑
  - - ね/示 + す/発 + ひ/辶 = 襪
  - - と/戸 + す/発 + ひ/辶 = 韈
- - ひ/辶 + 心 = 感
  - - る/忄 + ひ/辶 = 憾
  - - て/扌 + ひ/辶 + 心 = 撼
  - - む/車 + ひ/辶 + 心 = 轗
- - ひ/辶 + に/氵 = 減
- - れ/口 + ひ/辶 + selector 3 = 喊
- - ち/竹 + ひ/辶 + selector 3 = 箴
- - い/糹/#2 + ひ/辶 + selector 3 = 緘
- - か/金 + ひ/辶 + selector 3 = 鍼
- - せ/食 + ひ/辶 + selector 3 = 鰔
- - ん/止 + ひ/辶 + selector 3 = 鹹
- - 龸 + ひ/辶 = 戉
  - - か/金 + 龸 + ひ/辶 = 鉞
  - - は/辶 + ひ/辶 = 越
- - せ/食 + ひ/辶 = 成
  - - つ/土 + ひ/辶 = 城
  - - え/訁 + ひ/辶 = 誠
  - - 日 + せ/食 + ひ/辶 = 晟
  - - ち/竹 + せ/食 + ひ/辶 = 筬
- - ん/止 + ひ/辶 = 歳
- - く/艹 + ひ/辶 = 茂
- - ひ/辶 + ふ/女 = 威
  - - い/糹/#2 + ひ/辶 + ふ/女 = 縅
  - - せ/食 + ひ/辶 + ふ/女 = 鰄
- - ひ/辶 + う/宀/#3 = 戚
  - - ひ/辶 + み/耳 = 蹙
  - - 心 + ひ/辶 + う/宀/#3 = 槭
- - ひ/辶 + 火 = 滅

==== Compounds of 皮 ====
- - ふ/女 + ひ/辶 = 婆
- - ゆ/彳 + ひ/辶 = 彼
- - に/氵 + ひ/辶 = 波
  - - ま/石 + に/氵 + ひ/辶 = 碆
  - - 心 + に/氵 + ひ/辶 = 菠
- - や/疒 + ひ/辶 = 疲
- - ま/石 + ひ/辶 = 破
- - ね/示 + ひ/辶 = 被
- - み/耳 + ひ/辶 = 跛
- - お/頁 + ひ/辶 = 頗
- - つ/土 + selector 4 + ひ/辶 = 坡
- - て/扌 + selector 4 + ひ/辶 = 披
- - へ/⺩ + selector 4 + ひ/辶 = 玻
- - む/車 + selector 4 + ひ/辶 = 皴
- - 宿 + selector 4 + ひ/辶 = 皸
- - も/門 + selector 4 + ひ/辶 = 皺
- - ち/竹 + selector 4 + ひ/辶 = 簸
- - さ/阝 + selector 4 + ひ/辶 = 陂
- - と/戸 + selector 4 + ひ/辶 = 鞁
- - ひ/辶 + も/門 + selector 2 = 皰
- - ひ/辶 + 宿 + む/車 = 皹

==== Compounds of 巴 ====
- - ⺼ + ひ/辶 = 肥
- - 囗 + ひ/辶 = 邑
  - - よ/广 + 囗 + ひ/辶 = 廱
  - - る/忄 + 囗 + ひ/辶 = 悒
  - - と/戸 + 囗 + ひ/辶 = 扈
  - - に/氵 + 囗 + ひ/辶 = 滬
  - - や/疒 + 囗 + ひ/辶 = 癰
- - ち/竹 + selector 5 + ひ/辶 = 笆
- - よ/广 + 宿 + ひ/辶 = 巵
- - て/扌 + 宿 + ひ/辶 = 把
- - 心 + 龸 + ひ/辶 = 杷
- - ひ/辶 + ⺼ + つ/土 = 爬
- - へ/⺩ + 宿 + ひ/辶 = 琶
- - こ/子 + 宿 + ひ/辶 = 耙
- - 心 + 宿 + ひ/辶 = 芭

==== Compounds of 道 ====
- - ひ/辶 + し/巿 = 導
- - ひ/辶 + 数 + お/頁 = 馗

==== Compounds of 東 and 柬 ====
- - 氷/氵 + ひ/辶 = 凍
- - も/門 + ひ/辶 = 欄
  - - に/氵 + も/門 + ひ/辶 = 瀾
  - - 火 + も/門 + ひ/辶 = 爛
  - - ね/示 + も/門 + ひ/辶 = 襴
- - 火 + ひ/辶 = 煉
- - い/糹/#2 + ひ/辶 = 練
- - ゑ/訁 + ひ/辶 = 諌
- - か/金 + ひ/辶 = 錬
- - さ/阝 + ひ/辶 = 陳
- - て/扌 + 比 + ひ/辶 = 揀
- - き/木 + 比 + ひ/辶 = 棟
- - 心 + 比 + ひ/辶 = 楝
- - ゑ/訁 + 比 + ひ/辶 = 諫
- - せ/食 + 比 + ひ/辶 = 鰊
- - も/門 + 宿 + ひ/辶 = 闌
- - ひ/辶 + う/宀/#3 + せ/食 = 鶇
- - ひ/辶 + せ/食 + selector 1 = 鶫

==== Other compounds ====
- - な/亻 + ひ/辶 = 備
  - - る/忄 + な/亻 + ひ/辶 = 憊
- - の/禾 + 宿 + ひ/辶 = 糒
- - と/戸 + 宿 + ひ/辶 = 鞴
- - 日 + ひ/辶 = 晋
  - - 日 + 日 + ひ/辶 = 晉
  - - い/糹/#2 + 日 + ひ/辶 = 縉
- - ゐ/幺 + ひ/辶 = 紐
- - そ/馬 + ひ/辶 = 豹
- - ろ/十 + ひ/辶 = 飛
- - ひ/辶 + 宿 + せ/食 = 鶸
