= Braille pattern dots-1356 =

Braille pattern

6-dot braille cells
⠀	⠁	⠃	⠉	⠙	⠑	⠋	⠛	⠓	⠊	⠚	⠈	⠘
⠄	⠅	⠇	⠍	⠝	⠕	⠏	⠟	⠗	⠎	⠞	⠌	⠜
⠤	⠥	⠧	⠭	⠽	⠵	⠯	⠿	⠷	⠮	⠾	⠬	⠼
⠠	⠡	⠣	⠩	⠹	⠱	⠫	⠻	⠳	⠪	⠺	⠨	⠸
shift down	⠂	⠆	⠒	⠲	⠢	⠖	⠶	⠦	⠔	⠴	⠐	⠰

The Braille pattern dots-1356 ( ⠵ ) is a 6-dot braille cell with the top left, middle right, and both bottom dots raised, or an 8-dot braille cell with the top left, upper-middle right, and both lower-middle dots raised. It is represented by the Unicode code point U+2835, and in Braille ASCII with Z.

Character information
Preview	⠵ (braille pattern dots-1356)	
Unicode name	BRAILLE PATTERN DOTS-1356	
Encodings	decimal	hex
Unicode	10293	U+2835
UTF-8	226 160 181	E2 A0 B5
Numeric character reference	&#10293;	&#x2835;
Braille ASCII	90	5A

== Unified Braille ==
In unified international braille, the braille pattern dots-1356 is used to represent a voiced alveolar sibilant, i.e. /z/, or otherwise as needed.

=== Table of unified braille values ===
French Braille	Z, -ez, "elle"
English Braille	Z
English Contraction	as
German Braille	Z
Bharati Braille	ज़ / ਜ਼ / ණ / ز
Icelandic Braille	Z
IPA Braille	/z/
Russian Braille	З
Slovak Braille	Z
Arabic Braille	ز
Persian Braille	ز
Irish Braille	Z
Thai Braille	ำ am
Luxembourgish Braille	z (minuscule)

== Other braille ==
Japanese Braille	ma / ま / マ
Korean Braille	eun / 은
Mainland Chinese Braille	z
Taiwanese Braille	eng / ㄥ
Two-Cell Chinese Braille	qu- -ěng, 我 wǒ
Algerian Braille	ن

== Plus dots 7 and 8 ==
Related to Braille pattern dots-1356 are Braille patterns 13567, 13568, and 135678, which are used in 8-dot braille systems, such as Gardner-Salinas and Luxembourgish Braille.

Character information
Preview	⡵ (braille pattern dots-13567)		⢵ (braille pattern dots-13568)		⣵ (braille pattern dots-135678)	
Unicode name	BRAILLE PATTERN DOTS-13567		BRAILLE PATTERN DOTS-13568		BRAILLE PATTERN DOTS-135678	
Encodings	decimal	hex	dec	hex	dec	hex
Unicode	10357	U+2875	10421	U+28B5	10485	U+28F5
UTF-8	226 161 181	E2 A1 B5	226 162 181	E2 A2 B5	226 163 181	E2 A3 B5
Numeric character reference	&#10357;	&#x2875;	&#10421;	&#x28B5;	&#10485;	&#x28F5;

	dots 13567	dots 13568	dots 135678
Gardner Salinas Braille	Z (capital)	ζ (zeta)	
Luxembourgish Braille	Z (capital)		

== Related 8-dot kantenji patterns ==
In the Japanese kantenji braille, the standard 8-dot Braille patterns 2678, 12678, 24678, and 124678 are the patterns related to Braille pattern dots-1356, since the two additional dots of kantenji patterns 01356, 13567, and 013567 are placed above the base 6-dot cell, instead of below, as in standard 8-dot braille.

Character information
Preview	⣢ (braille pattern dots-2678)		⣣ (braille pattern dots-12678)		⣪ (braille pattern dots-24678)		⣫ (braille pattern dots-124678)	
Unicode name	BRAILLE PATTERN DOTS-2678		BRAILLE PATTERN DOTS-12678		BRAILLE PATTERN DOTS-24678		BRAILLE PATTERN DOTS-124678	
Encodings	decimal	hex	dec	hex	dec	hex	dec	hex
Unicode	10466	U+28E2	10467	U+28E3	10474	U+28EA	10475	U+28EB
UTF-8	226 163 162	E2 A3 A2	226 163 163	E2 A3 A3	226 163 170	E2 A3 AA	226 163 171	E2 A3 AB
Numeric character reference	&#10466;	&#x28E2;	&#10467;	&#x28E3;	&#10474;	&#x28EA;	&#10475;	&#x28EB;

=== Kantenji using braille patterns 2678, 12678, 24678, or 124678 ===
This listing includes kantenji using Braille pattern dots-1356 for all 6349 kanji found in JIS C 6226-1978.

- - 石

==== Variants and thematic compounds ====
- - selector 1 + ま/石 = 亟
- - selector 4 + ま/石 = 了
- - selector 5 + ま/石 = 曼
- - selector 6 + ま/石 = 辟
- - ま/石 + selector 1 = 立
- - 宿 + ま/石 = 寵
- - 数 + ま/石 = 万

==== Compounds of 石 ====
- - へ/⺩ + ま/石 = 碧
- - お/頁 + ま/石 = 碩
- - よ/广 + ま/石 = 磨
- - ま/石 + や/疒 = 岩
- - ま/石 + て/扌 = 拓
- - ま/石 + そ/馬 = 砂
- - ま/石 + ね/示 = 研
- - ま/石 + お/頁 = 砕
  - - ま/石 + ま/石 + お/頁 = 碎
- - ま/石 + 比 = 砦
- - ま/石 + も/門 = 砲
- - ま/石 + ひ/辶 = 破
- - ま/石 + こ/子 = 砿
- - ま/石 + ⺼ = 硝
- - ま/石 + く/艹 = 硫
- - ま/石 + な/亻 = 硬
- - ま/石 + よ/广 = 碍
- - ま/石 + た/⽥ = 碑
- - ま/石 + い/糹/#2 = 確
- - ま/石 + ゐ/幺 = 磁
- - ま/石 + 囗 = 磯
- - ま/石 + 火 = 礁
- - ま/石 + き/木 = 礎
- - ま/石 + ま/石 + ま/石 = 磊
- - ふ/女 + 宿 + ま/石 = 妬
- - う/宀/#3 + 宿 + ま/石 = 宕
- - ま/石 + 宿 + を/貝 = 斫
- - 心 + う/宀/#3 + ま/石 = 柘
- - ま/石 + こ/子 + selector 1 = 矼
- - ま/石 + れ/口 + ぬ/力 = 砌
- - ま/石 + 宿 + 比 = 砒
- - ま/石 + selector 5 + そ/馬 = 砠
- - ま/石 + selector 1 + ん/止 = 砥
- - ま/石 + れ/口 + と/戸 = 砧
- - ま/石 + 宿 + つ/土 = 硅
- - ま/石 + め/目 + 宿 = 硯
- - ま/石 + た/⽥ + selector 1 = 硲
- - ま/石 + く/艹 + 比 = 硴
- - ま/石 + ら/月 + ら/月 = 硼
- - き/木 + 宿 + ま/石 = 碁
- - ま/石 + に/氵 + ひ/辶 = 碆
- - ま/石 + う/宀/#3 + よ/广 = 碇
- - ま/石 + 宿 + み/耳 = 碌
- - ま/石 + 宿 + い/糹/#2 = 碓
- - ま/石 + 宿 + け/犬 = 碕
- - ま/石 + 宿 + う/宀/#3 = 碗
- - ま/石 + 宿 + ま/石 = 碚
- - ま/石 + 宿 + ま/石 = 碚
- - ま/石 + 宿 + 氷/氵 = 碣
- - ま/石 + selector 1 + き/木 = 碪
- - ま/石 + 宿 + ち/竹 = 碯
- - ま/石 + を/貝 + と/戸 = 碵
- - ま/石 + 龸 + そ/馬 = 碼
- - ま/石 + と/戸 + と/戸 = 碾
- - ま/石 + 宿 + ほ/方 = 磅
- - ま/石 + か/金 + ら/月 = 磆
- - ま/石 + そ/馬 + こ/子 = 磋
- - ま/石 + 宿 + の/禾 = 磐
- - ま/石 + selector 5 + や/疒 = 磑
- - ま/石 + 宿 + き/木 = 磔
- - ま/石 + selector 4 + て/扌 = 磚
- - ま/石 + へ/⺩ + を/貝 = 磧
- - ま/石 + み/耳 + の/禾 = 磬
- - ま/石 + す/発 + と/戸 = 磴
- - ま/石 + 龸 + つ/土 = 磽
- - ま/石 + 囗 + の/禾 = 礇
- - ま/石 + 龸 + ふ/女 = 礑
- - ま/石 + そ/馬 + 囗 = 礒
- - ま/石 + や/疒 + よ/广 = 礙
- - ま/石 + よ/广 + こ/子 = 礦
- - ま/石 + 龸 + ま/石 = 礪
- - ま/石 + 日 + ゐ/幺 = 礫
- - ま/石 + き/木 + き/木 = 礬
- - む/車 + 宿 + ま/石 = 蠧
- - む/車 + 龸 + ま/石 = 蠹
- - み/耳 + 宿 + ま/石 = 跖
- - か/金 + 龸 + ま/石 = 鉐
- - せ/食 + う/宀/#3 + ま/石 = 鮖

==== Compounds of 亟 ====
- - き/木 + ま/石 = 極
- - 囗 + ま/石 = 函
  - - 囗 + 囗 + ま/石 = 凾
  - - に/氵 + 囗 + ま/石 = 涵

==== Compounds of 了 ====
- - 龸 + ま/石 = 亨
  - - 火 + 龸 + ま/石 = 烹
- - ま/石 + 氷/氵 = 承

==== Compounds of 曼 ====
- - し/巿 + ま/石 = 幔
- - る/忄 + ま/石 = 慢
- - 氷/氵 + ま/石 = 漫
- - い/糹/#2 + 宿 + ま/石 = 縵
- - く/艹 + 宿 + ま/石 = 蔓
- - く/艹 + 龸 + ま/石 = 蘰
- - え/訁 + 龸 + ま/石 = 謾
- - か/金 + 宿 + ま/石 = 鏝
- - せ/食 + 龸 + ま/石 = 饅
- - と/戸 + う/宀/#3 + ま/石 = 鬘
- - せ/食 + 宿 + ま/石 = 鰻

==== Compounds of 辟 ====
- - や/疒 + ま/石 = 癖
- - ⺼ + ま/石 = 臂
- - ひ/辶 + ま/石 = 避
- - ま/石 + つ/土 = 壁
- - ま/石 + へ/⺩ = 璧
- - ふ/女 + selector 6 + ま/石 = 嬖
- - く/艹 + selector 6 + ま/石 = 薜
- - 心 + selector 6 + ま/石 = 蘗
- - み/耳 + selector 6 + ま/石 = 躄
- - き/木 + ま/石 + selector 1 = 蘖
- - な/亻 + 宿 + ま/石 = 僻
- - ぬ/力 + 宿 + ま/石 = 劈
- - て/扌 + 宿 + ま/石 = 擘
- - 心 + 龸 + ま/石 = 檗
- - ま/石 + selector 6 + か/金 = 甓
- - 心 + ろ/十 + ま/石 = 薛
- - ね/示 + 宿 + ま/石 = 襞
- - え/訁 + 宿 + ま/石 = 譬
- - も/門 + 宿 + ま/石 = 闢
- - ち/竹 + 宿 + ま/石 = 霹

==== Compounds of 立 ====
- - ま/石 + ま/石 = 並
  - - ま/石 + ふ/女 = 普
  - - き/木 + ま/石 + ま/石 = 椪
- - な/亻 + ま/石 = 位
  - - く/艹 + な/亻 + ま/石 = 莅
- - 仁/亻 + ま/石 = 倍
- - つ/土 + ま/石 = 培
- - 火 + ま/石 = 焙
- - を/貝 + ま/石 = 賠
- - さ/阝 + ま/石 = 陪
- - ま/石 + ぬ/力 = 剖
  - - ま/石 + ぬ/力 + 囗 = 韶
- - ま/石 + さ/阝 = 部
  - - く/艹 + ま/石 + さ/阝 = 蔀
- - 日 + ま/石 = 暗
- - ゑ/訁 + ま/石 = 諳
- - も/門 + ま/石 = 闇
- - ゐ/幺 + ま/石 = 響
- - に/氵 + ま/石 = 泣
- - め/目 + ま/石 = 瞳
- - ち/竹 + ま/石 = 笠
- - の/禾 + ま/石 = 粒
- - む/車 + ま/石 = 翌
- - ま/石 + え/訁 = 商
- - ま/石 + し/巿 = 帝
  - - い/糹/#2 + ま/石 = 締
  - - え/訁 + ま/石 = 諦
  - - み/耳 + ま/石 = 蹄
  - - 囗 + ま/石 + し/巿 = 啻
  - - れ/口 + ま/石 + し/巿 = 啼
  - - 心 + ま/石 + し/巿 = 楴
  - - く/艹 + ま/石 + し/巿 = 蒂
- - ま/石 + う/宀/#3 = 彰
- - ふ/女 + ま/石 = 妾
  - - て/扌 + ま/石 = 接
  - - き/木 + ふ/女 + ま/石 = 椄
  - - ち/竹 + ふ/女 + ま/石 = 霎
- - ま/石 + 心 = 竜
- - ま/石 + ち/竹 = 篭
  - - ま/石 + ま/石 + 心 = 龍
    - - つ/土 + ま/石 + 心 = 壟
    - - へ/⺩ + ま/石 + 心 = 瓏
    - - ち/竹 + ま/石 + 心 = 籠
    - - 心 + ま/石 + 心 = 蘢
    - - さ/阝 + ま/石 + 心 = 隴
  - - き/木 + ま/石 + 心 = 槞
- - ま/石 + ろ/十 = 章
  - - 心 + ま/石 + ろ/十 = 樟
  - - へ/⺩ + ま/石 + ろ/十 = 璋
  - - や/疒 + ま/石 + ろ/十 = 瘴
  - - せ/食 + ま/石 + ろ/十 = 鱆
- - ま/石 + り/分 = 童
  - - な/亻 + ま/石 + り/分 = 僮
  - - に/氵 + ま/石 + り/分 = 潼
  - - し/巿 + ま/石 + り/分 = 幢
  - - て/扌 + ま/石 + り/分 = 撞
  - - き/木 + ま/石 + り/分 = 橦
  - - ふ/女 + ま/石 + り/分 = 艟
- - ま/石 + の/禾 = 端
- - ま/石 + 宿 = 競
  - - ま/石 + ま/石 + 宿 = 竸
- - ま/石 + せ/食 = 靖
- - ま/石 + 日 = 音
- - ま/石 + れ/口 = 韻
- - ろ/十 + ま/石 = 辛
  - - ま/石 + を/貝 = 新
    - - れ/口 + ま/石 = 噺
    - - く/艹 + ま/石 = 薪
  - - う/宀/#3 + ま/石 = 宰
  - - せ/食 + ま/石 = 辞
  - - ま/石 + め/目 = 親
  - - ま/石 + 数 = 辣
- - て/扌 + ま/石 + selector 1 = 拉
- - ま/石 + ま/石 + selector 1 = 竝
- - す/発 + ま/石 + selector 1 = 竪
- - 心 + ま/石 + selector 1 = 苙
- - ね/示 + ま/石 + め/目 = 襯
- - し/巿 + ま/石 + 日 = 黯
- - や/疒 + う/宀/#3 + ま/石 = 嶂
- - き/木 + 龸 + ま/石 = 柆
- - ほ/方 + 宿 + ま/石 = 殕
- - ま/石 + 宿 + そ/馬 = 毅
- - に/氵 + う/宀/#3 + ま/石 = 滓
- - い/糹/#2 + う/宀/#3 + ま/石 = 縡
- - ま/石 + 宿 + ろ/十 = 竍
- - ま/石 + 数 + せ/食 = 竏
- - ま/石 + 宿 + せ/食 = 竓
- - ま/石 + 宿 + り/分 = 竕
- - ま/石 + 宿 + と/戸 = 站
- - ま/石 + 数 + て/扌 = 竚
- - ま/石 + 数 + め/目 = 竡
- - ま/石 + selector 6 + む/車 = 竢
- - ま/石 + 宿 + む/車 = 竣
- - ま/石 + き/木 + 数 = 竦
- - ま/石 + 龸 + 氷/氵 = 竭
- - ま/石 + よ/广 + り/分 = 竰
- - ま/石 + む/車 + selector 2 = 翊
- - 心 + 宿 + ま/石 = 菩
- - せ/食 + せ/食 + ま/石 = 辭
- - ま/石 + 宿 + も/門 = 韵
- - ま/石 + む/車 + 宿 = 颯
- - ま/石 + 宿 + 火 = 靡
- - ま/石 + selector 4 + せ/食 = 麾
- - ま/石 + り/分 + 囗 = 龕

==== Compounds of 寵 ====
- - ら/月 + ま/石 = 朧

==== Compounds of 万 ====
- - ぬ/力 + ま/石 = 励
- - 数 + 数 + ま/石 = 萬
  - - や/疒 + 数 + ま/石 = 癘
  - - の/禾 + 数 + ま/石 = 糲
- - 心 + 数 + ま/石 = 栃
- - ま/石 + 数 + ま/石 = 砺
- - む/車 + 数 + ま/石 = 蛎

==== Other compounds ====
- - は/辶 + ま/石 = 邁
- - ぬ/力 + ぬ/力 + ま/石 = 勵
- - か/金 + ま/石 = 鎌
- - 心 + ま/石 = 麻
  - - ま/石 + み/耳 = 麿
  - - れ/口 + 心 + ま/石 = 嘛
  - - や/疒 + 心 + ま/石 = 痲
  - - の/禾 + 心 + ま/石 = 糜
  - - い/糹/#2 + 心 + ま/石 = 縻
  - - ゐ/幺 + 心 + ま/石 = 麼
- - め/目 + 宿 + ま/石 = 睫
