= Braille pattern dots-1234 =

Braille pattern

6-dot braille cells
⠀	⠁	⠃	⠉	⠙	⠑	⠋	⠛	⠓	⠊	⠚	⠈	⠘
⠄	⠅	⠇	⠍	⠝	⠕	⠏	⠟	⠗	⠎	⠞	⠌	⠜
⠤	⠥	⠧	⠭	⠽	⠵	⠯	⠿	⠷	⠮	⠾	⠬	⠼
⠠	⠡	⠣	⠩	⠹	⠱	⠫	⠻	⠳	⠪	⠺	⠨	⠸
shift down	⠂	⠆	⠒	⠲	⠢	⠖	⠶	⠦	⠔	⠴	⠐	⠰

The Braille pattern dots-1234 ( ⠏ ) is a 6-dot braille cell with both top and all left-side dots raised, or an 8-dot braille cell with both top and both middle-left dots raised. It is represented by the Unicode code point U+280f, and in Braille ASCII with P.

Character information
Preview	⠏ (braille pattern dots-1234)	
Unicode name	BRAILLE PATTERN DOTS-1234	
Encodings	decimal	hex
Unicode	10255	U+280F
UTF-8	226 160 143	E2 A0 8F
Numeric character reference	&#10255;	&#x280F;
Braille ASCII	80	50

== Unified Braille ==
In unified international braille, the braille pattern dots-1234 is used to represent a voiceless bilabial plosive, i.e. /p/.

=== Table of unified braille values ===
French Braille	P, "par"
English Braille	P
English contraction	people
German Braille	P
Bharati Braille	प / ਪ / પ / প / ପ / ప / ಪ / പ / ப / ප / پ
Icelandic Braille	P
IPA Braille	/p/
Russian Braille	П
Slovak Braille	P
Persian Braille	پ
Irish Braille	P
Thai Braille	ผ ph
Luxembourgish Braille	p (minuscule)

== Other braille ==
Japanese Braille	ne / ね / ネ
Korean Braille	wo / ㅝ
Mainland Chinese Braille	P
Taiwanese Braille	P / ㄆ
Two-Cell Chinese Braille	n- -ān
Algerian Braille	ط

== Plus dots 7 and 8 ==
Related to Braille pattern dots-1234 are Braille patterns 12347, 12348, and 123478, which are used in 8-dot braille systems, such as Gardner-Salinas and Luxembourgish Braille.

Character information
Preview	⡏ (braille pattern dots-12347)		⢏ (braille pattern dots-12348)		⣏ (braille pattern dots-123478)	
Unicode name	BRAILLE PATTERN DOTS-12347		BRAILLE PATTERN DOTS-12348		BRAILLE PATTERN DOTS-123478	
Encodings	decimal	hex	dec	hex	dec	hex
Unicode	10319	U+284F	10383	U+288F	10447	U+28CF
UTF-8	226 161 143	E2 A1 8F	226 162 143	E2 A2 8F	226 163 143	E2 A3 8F
Numeric character reference	&#10319;	&#x284F;	&#10383;	&#x288F;	&#10447;	&#x28CF;

	dots 12347	dots 12348	dots 123478
Gardner Salinas Braille	P (capital)	π (pi)	Π (Pi)
Luxembourgish Braille	P (capital)		

== Related 8-dot kantenji patterns ==
In the Japanese kantenji braille, the standard 8-dot Braille patterns 2357, 12357, 23457, and 123457 are the patterns related to Braille pattern dots-1234, since the two additional dots of kantenji patterns 01234, 12347, and 012347 are placed above the base 6-dot cell, instead of below, as in standard 8-dot braille.

Character information
Preview	⡖ (braille pattern dots-2357)		⡗ (braille pattern dots-12357)		⡞ (braille pattern dots-23457)		⡟ (braille pattern dots-123457)	
Unicode name	BRAILLE PATTERN DOTS-2357		BRAILLE PATTERN DOTS-12357		BRAILLE PATTERN DOTS-23457		BRAILLE PATTERN DOTS-123457	
Encodings	decimal	hex	dec	hex	dec	hex	dec	hex
Unicode	10326	U+2856	10327	U+2857	10334	U+285E	10335	U+285F
UTF-8	226 161 150	E2 A1 96	226 161 151	E2 A1 97	226 161 158	E2 A1 9E	226 161 159	E2 A1 9F
Numeric character reference	&#10326;	&#x2856;	&#10327;	&#x2857;	&#10334;	&#x285E;	&#10335;	&#x285F;

=== Kantenji using braille patterns 2357, 12357, 23457, or 123457 ===
This listing includes kantenji using Braille pattern dots-1234 for all 6349 kanji found in JIS C 6226-1978.

- - 示

==== Variants and thematic compounds ====
- - selector 1 + ね/示 = 衷
- - selector 3 + ね/示 = 幵
- - selector 4 + ね/示 = 剣
  - - selector 1 + selector 4 + ね/示 = 剱
- - selector 4 + selector 4 + ね/示 = 劍
  - - selector 5 + selector 4 + ね/示 = 劔
  - - selector 6 + selector 4 + ね/示 = 劒
- - ね/示 + selector 1 = 衣
- - ね/示 + selector 4 = 袖

==== Compounds of 示 ====
- - う/宀/#3 + ね/示 = 宗
  - - や/疒 + ね/示 = 崇
  - - 心 + う/宀/#3 + ね/示 = 棕
  - - に/氵 + う/宀/#3 + ね/示 = 淙
  - - の/禾 + う/宀/#3 + ね/示 = 粽
  - - い/糹/#2 + う/宀/#3 + ね/示 = 綜
  - - み/耳 + う/宀/#3 + ね/示 = 踪
- - に/氵 + ね/示 = 票
  - - ぬ/力 + に/氵 + ね/示 = 剽
  - - ふ/女 + に/氵 + ね/示 = 嫖
  - - る/忄 + に/氵 + ね/示 = 慓
  - - 心 + に/氵 + ね/示 = 瓢
  - - い/糹/#2 + に/氵 + ね/示 = 縹
  - - む/車 + に/氵 + ね/示 = 飄
  - - そ/馬 + に/氵 + ね/示 = 驃
  - - せ/食 + に/氵 + ね/示 = 鰾
- - き/木 + ね/示 = 禁
  - - れ/口 + き/木 + ね/示 = 噤
  - - ね/示 + き/木 + ね/示 = 襟
- - ね/示 + さ/阝 = 祭
  - - ね/示 + て/扌 = 擦
  - - く/艹 + ね/示 + さ/阝 = 蔡
- - ね/示 + 仁/亻 = 祠
- - ね/示 + ゑ/訁 = 祓
- - と/戸 + ね/示 = 尉
  - - 火 + と/戸 + ね/示 = 熨
  - - く/艹 + と/戸 + ね/示 = 蔚
- - ん/止 + ね/示 = 款
- - ね/示 + ゆ/彳 = 隷
  - - ね/示 + ね/示 + ゆ/彳 = 隸
- - ね/示 + 比 + へ/⺩ = 祟
- - ね/示 + 囗 + れ/口 = 禀
- - ね/示 + ゆ/彳 + さ/阝 = 禦
- - 心 + 宿 + ね/示 = 蒜
- - ね/示 + ね/示 + ゆ/彳 = 隸
- - ね/示 + 宿 + お/頁 = 頴
- - ね/示 + ぬ/力 = 初
  - - ね/示 + ぬ/力 + け/犬 = 禊
- - ね/示 + と/戸 = 礼
- - ね/示 + つ/土 = 社
  - - ね/示 + つ/土 + 囗 = 禧
  - - ね/示 + つ/土 + つ/土 = 褂
  - - ね/示 + つ/土 + れ/口 = 襭
- - ね/示 + を/貝 = 祈
- - ね/示 + ん/止 = 祉
- - ね/示 + 数 = 祐
- - ね/示 + そ/馬 = 祖
- - ね/示 + 宿 = 祝
- - ね/示 + し/巿 = 神
  - - 心 + ね/示 + し/巿 = 榊
  - - せ/食 + ね/示 + し/巿 = 鰰
- - ね/示 + 龸 = 祢
  - - ね/示 + ね/示 + 龸 = 袮
- - ね/示 + よ/广 = 祥
- - ね/示 + へ/⺩ = 祷
- - ね/示 + み/耳 = 禄
  - - ね/示 + ね/示 + み/耳 = 祿
- - ね/示 + れ/口 = 禅
  - - ね/示 + ね/示 + れ/口 = 禪
  - - ね/示 + れ/口 + れ/口 = 襌
- - ね/示 + か/金 = 禍
- - ね/示 + ふ/女 = 福
- - ね/示 + 日 = 衿
- - ね/示 + ひ/辶 = 被
- - ね/示 + た/⽥ = 裕
- - ね/示 + ほ/方 = 補
- - ね/示 + き/木 = 裸
- - ね/示 + す/発 = 複
- - ね/示 + む/車 = 褌
- - ね/示 + 氷/氵 = 褐
- - ね/示 + め/目 = 視
- - ね/示 + ね/示 + と/戸 = 禮
- - ね/示 + 宿 + き/木 = 祀
- - ね/示 + 龸 + さ/阝 = 祁
- - ね/示 + selector 1 + ん/止 = 祇
- - ね/示 + 宿 + ん/止 = 祗
- - ね/示 + 宿 + さ/阝 = 祚
- - ね/示 + selector 4 + き/木 = 祺
- - ね/示 + を/貝 + と/戸 = 禎
- - ね/示 + 龸 + た/⽥ = 禝
- - ね/示 + 囗 + め/目 = 禰
- - ね/示 + 宿 + み/耳 = 禳
- - ね/示 + 宿 + う/宀/#3 = 衫
- - ね/示 + 囗 + 仁/亻 = 衲
- - ね/示 + 宿 + 日 = 衵
- - ね/示 + 数 + に/氵 = 衽
- - ね/示 + 宿 + て/扌 = 袂
- - ね/示 + も/門 + selector 2 = 袍
- - ね/示 + selector 4 + 日 = 袒
- - ね/示 + う/宀/#3 + う/宀/#3 = 袗
- - ね/示 + 日 + selector 1 = 袙
- - ね/示 + ろ/十 + は/辶 = 袢
- - ね/示 + な/亻 + け/犬 = 袱
- - ね/示 + 宿 + け/犬 = 袴
- - ね/示 + 仁/亻 + に/氵 = 袵
- - ね/示 + り/分 + 囗 = 袷
- - ね/示 + 宿 + つ/土 = 袿
- - ね/示 + う/宀/#3 + 龸 = 裃
- - ね/示 + 宿 + ゆ/彳 = 裄
- - ね/示 + お/頁 + selector 1 = 裙
- - ね/示 + 比 + り/分 = 裡
- - ね/示 + た/⽥ + さ/阝 = 裨
- - ね/示 + ち/竹 + selector 4 = 裲
- - ね/示 + 日 + 数 = 裼
- - ね/示 + と/戸 + selector 1 = 裾
- - ね/示 + ふ/女 + さ/阝 = 褄
- - ね/示 + 宿 + へ/⺩ = 褊
- - ね/示 + な/亻 + れ/口 = 褓
- - ね/示 + 宿 + れ/口 = 褝
- - ね/示 + 宿 + ⺼ = 褞
- - ね/示 + し/巿 + ろ/十 = 褥
- - ね/示 + ひ/辶 + や/疒 = 褪
- - ね/示 + す/発 + selector 3 = 褫
- - ね/示 + む/車 + 日 = 褶
- - ね/示 + 宿 + る/忄 = 褸
- - ね/示 + ゆ/彳 + む/車 = 襁
- - ね/示 + き/木 + い/糹/#2 = 襍
- - ね/示 + 囗 + の/禾 = 襖
- - ね/示 + 龸 + ふ/女 = 襠
- - ね/示 + す/発 + ⺼ = 襤
- - ね/示 + ち/竹 + の/禾 = 襦
- - ね/示 + す/発 + ひ/辶 = 襪
- - ね/示 + ま/石 + め/目 = 襯
- - ね/示 + も/門 + ひ/辶 = 襴
- - ね/示 + う/宀/#3 + て/扌 = 襷

==== Compounds of 刂 and 力 ====
- - は/辶 + ね/示 = 判
- - れ/口 + ね/示 = 別
  - - て/扌 + れ/口 + ね/示 = 捌
- - め/目 + ね/示 = 刹
- - ゐ/幺 + ね/示 = 刻
- - 囗 + ね/示 = 剛
- - さ/阝 + ね/示 = 剤
  - - さ/阝 + さ/阝 + ね/示 = 劑
- - の/禾 + ね/示 = 剰
  - - の/禾 + の/禾 + ね/示 = 剩
- - そ/馬 + ね/示 = 劇
- - す/発 + ね/示 = 罰
- - け/犬 + 宿 + ね/示 = 剄
- - ね/示 + か/金 + き/木 = 剿
- - け/犬 + ね/示 = 勧
  - - け/犬 + け/犬 + ね/示 = 勸
- - ⺼ + ね/示 = 脇

==== Compounds of 衷 ====
- - 龸 + ね/示 = 哀
- - ろ/十 + ね/示 = 喪
- - 宿 + ね/示 = 衰
  - - き/木 + 宿 + ね/示 = 榱
  - - く/艹 + 宿 + ね/示 = 蓑
  - - ち/竹 + 宿 + ね/示 = 簑
  - - ち/竹 + 龸 + ね/示 = 簔

==== Compounds of 幵 ====
- - ふ/女 + ね/示 = 妍
- - ま/石 + ね/示 = 研
- - ね/示 + ね/示 = 刑
  - - 心 + ね/示 + ね/示 = 荊
- - ね/示 + う/宀/#3 = 形
- - き/木 + selector 3 + ね/示 = 枅

==== Compounds of 衣 ====
- - み/耳 + ね/示 = 裁
- - ほ/方 + ね/示 = 裂
- - つ/土 + ね/示 = 装
  - - つ/土 + つ/土 + ね/示 = 裝
- - り/分 + ね/示 = 裏
- - せ/食 + ね/示 = 製
- - ね/示 + な/亻 = 依
- - ね/示 + ろ/十 = 嚢
- - ね/示 + 囗 = 袋
- - ね/示 + え/訁 = 裔
- - ね/示 + 心 = 襲
- - へ/⺩ + ね/示 = 表
  - - 仁/亻 + ね/示 = 俵
- - た/⽥ + ね/示 = 畏
- - た/⽥ + ね/示 + selector 1 = 畩
- - 宿 + ね/示 + selector 1 = 袞
- - 龸 + ね/示 + selector 1 = 褻
- - ね/示 + selector 1 + よ/广 = 袤
- - ね/示 + り/分 + selector 1 = 衾
- - ね/示 + ぬ/力 + れ/口 = 袈
- - ね/示 + 比 + は/辶 = 袰
- - ね/示 + ろ/十 + に/氵 = 裘
- - ね/示 + 氷/氵 + ほ/方 = 裟
- - ね/示 + selector 6 + は/辶 = 裳
- - ね/示 + selector 4 + 火 = 裴
- - ね/示 + た/⽥ + き/木 = 裹
- - ね/示 + 宿 + ま/石 = 襞

==== Other compounds ====
- - 日 + ね/示 = 昔
  - - な/亻 + ね/示 = 借
  - - る/忄 + ね/示 = 惜
  - - て/扌 + ね/示 = 措
  - - か/金 + ね/示 = 錯
  - - ち/竹 + ね/示 = 籍
  - - く/艹 + 日 + ね/示 = 藉
  - - せ/食 + 日 + ね/示 = 醋
  - - ね/示 + 宿 + せ/食 = 鵲
