= Greek Braille =

Braille alphabet of the Greek language

Greek Braille is the braille alphabet of the Greek language. It is based on international braille conventions, generally corresponding to Latin transliteration. In Greek, it is known as Κώδικας Μπράιγ Kódikas Bráig "Braille Code".

There are actually two Greek braille alphabets, which differ in the assignment of a few letters: Modern Greek Braille used in Greece, and International Greek Braille for Greek letters or words used in mathematics or otherwise embedded in English and other languages.

== Modern Greek Braille ==
Modern Greek Braille
- Script type: alphabet
- Print basis: Greek alphabet
- Languages: Greek

Related scripts
- Parent systems: Braille: English Braille; Modern Greek Braille

Modern Greek Braille runs as follows:

=== Letters ===
Basic print alphabet
α	β	γ	δ	ε	ζ	η	θ	ι	κ	λ	μ
⠁ (braille pattern dots-1)	⠃ (braille pattern dots-12)	⠛ (braille pattern dots-1245)	⠙ (braille pattern dots-145)	⠑ (braille pattern dots-15)	⠵ (braille pattern dots-1356)	⠜ (braille pattern dots-345)	⠹ (braille pattern dots-1456)	⠊ (braille pattern dots-24)	⠅ (braille pattern dots-13)	⠇ (braille pattern dots-123)	⠍ (braille pattern dots-134)
ν	ξ	ο	π	ρ	σ	τ	υ	φ	χ	ψ	ω
⠝ (braille pattern dots-1345)	⠭ (braille pattern dots-1346)	⠕ (braille pattern dots-135)	⠏ (braille pattern dots-1234)	⠗ (braille pattern dots-1235)	⠎ (braille pattern dots-234)	⠞ (braille pattern dots-2345)	⠽ (braille pattern dots-13456)	⠋ (braille pattern dots-124)	⠓ (braille pattern dots-125)	⠯ (braille pattern dots-12346)	⠚ (braille pattern dots-245)

Letters for print digraphs
αι	ει	οι	υι	αυ	ευ	ηυ	ου
⠣ (braille pattern dots-126)	⠩ (braille pattern dots-146)	⠪ (braille pattern dots-246)	⠻ (braille pattern dots-12456)	⠡ (braille pattern dots-16)	⠱ (braille pattern dots-156)	⠳ (braille pattern dots-1256)	⠥ (braille pattern dots-136)

=== Punctuation and formatting ===
.	,	'	; ?	:	-
⠲ (braille pattern dots-256)	⠂ (braille pattern dots-2)	⠄ (braille pattern dots-3)	⠢ (braille pattern dots-26)	⠆ (braille pattern dots-23)	⠤ (braille pattern dots-36)
Parenthesis		Open quote	Close quote	Capital	Accent
⠶ (braille pattern dots-2356)		⠦ (braille pattern dots-236)	⠴ (braille pattern dots-356)	⠨ (braille pattern dots-46)	⠐ (braille pattern dots-5)

The accent mark (acute accent) comes before the vowel or diphthong, but after the capitalization sign: ⠐⠁ ά, ⠨⠐⠁ Ά, ⠐⠣ αί. It is not used for diaeresis; ϊ is just ⠊.

=== Numbers ===
Digits are the same as in English Braille. Arithmetical symbols are:

+	−	*	/	=
⠮ (braille pattern dots-2346)	⠤ (braille pattern dots-36)	⠡ (braille pattern dots-16)	⠌ (braille pattern dots-34)	⠭ (braille pattern dots-1346)

== International Greek Braille ==
International Greek Braille
- Script type: alphabet
- Print basis: Greek alphabet
- Languages: Greek

Related scripts
- Parent systems: Braille: English Braille; International Greek Braille

International letter assignments differ somewhat from those above. In Modern Greek Braille, for example, the letter omega (ω) is written the same as Latin j, whereas in English or French braille texts it is written as a w, which it resembles in print. Similarly, Modern Greek upsilon is written as Latin y, but in international Greek it is written as u, and the letter eta is inverted.

This alphabet is used, for example, in mathematical notation in an otherwise Latin-braille text. It also forms the basis for Greek letters in the Nemeth Braille and Gardner–Salinas braille codes. It is not used in Greece or Cyprus. In the table below, the letters which differ from Modern Greek Braille are highlighted.

Greek letters found in English Braille text
α	β	γ	δ	ε	ζ	η	θ	ι	κ	λ	μ
⠁ (braille pattern dots-1)	⠃ (braille pattern dots-12)	⠛ (braille pattern dots-1245)	⠙ (braille pattern dots-145)	⠑ (braille pattern dots-15)	⠵ (braille pattern dots-1356)	⠱ (braille pattern dots-156)	⠹ (braille pattern dots-1456)	⠊ (braille pattern dots-24)	⠅ (braille pattern dots-13)	⠇ (braille pattern dots-123)	⠍ (braille pattern dots-134)
ν	ξ	ο	π	ρ	σ	τ	υ	φ	χ	ψ	ω
⠝ (braille pattern dots-1345)	⠭ (braille pattern dots-1346)	⠕ (braille pattern dots-135)	⠏ (braille pattern dots-1234)	⠗ (braille pattern dots-1235)	⠎ (braille pattern dots-234)	⠞ (braille pattern dots-2345)	⠥ (braille pattern dots-136)	⠋ (braille pattern dots-124)	⠯ (braille pattern dots-12346)	⠽ (braille pattern dots-13456)	⠺ (braille pattern dots-2456)

The Modern Greek digraphs are not used. In addition, there are assignments for obsolete letters used in Greek numerals:

Obsolete letters
ϛ	ϡ	ϝ	ϙ/ϟ
⠉ (braille pattern dots-14)	⠮ (braille pattern dots-2346)	⠧ (braille pattern dots-1236)	⠟ (braille pattern dots-12345)

=== Polytonic ===
International Greek braille does, however, represent the polytonic vowels of ancient forms of the language, either as a separate accent mark with the normal vowel signs, or as a single braille cell for vowel+accent. Polytonic vowels sharing a braille pattern with obsolete letters are highlighted in the table.

Polytonic letters
	Accent	α	ε	η	ι	ο	υ	ω
Acute ´ (oxia)	⠈ (braille pattern dots-4)	⠜ (braille pattern dots-345)	⠫ (braille pattern dots-1246)	⠿ (braille pattern dots-123456)	⠻ (braille pattern dots-12456)	⠪ (braille pattern dots-246)	⠳ (braille pattern dots-1256)	⠚ (braille pattern dots-245)
Circumflex ῀ (perispomeni)	⠐ (braille pattern dots-5)	⠡ (braille pattern dots-16)	-	⠣ (braille pattern dots-126)	⠩ (braille pattern dots-146)	-	⠧ (braille pattern dots-1236)	⠼ (braille pattern dots-3456)
Grave ` (varia)	⠠ (braille pattern dots-6)	⠷ (braille pattern dots-12356)	⠉ (braille pattern dots-14)	⠮ (braille pattern dots-2346)	⠌ (braille pattern dots-34)	⠬ (braille pattern dots-346)	⠾ (braille pattern dots-23456)	⠟ (braille pattern dots-12345)

== See also ==
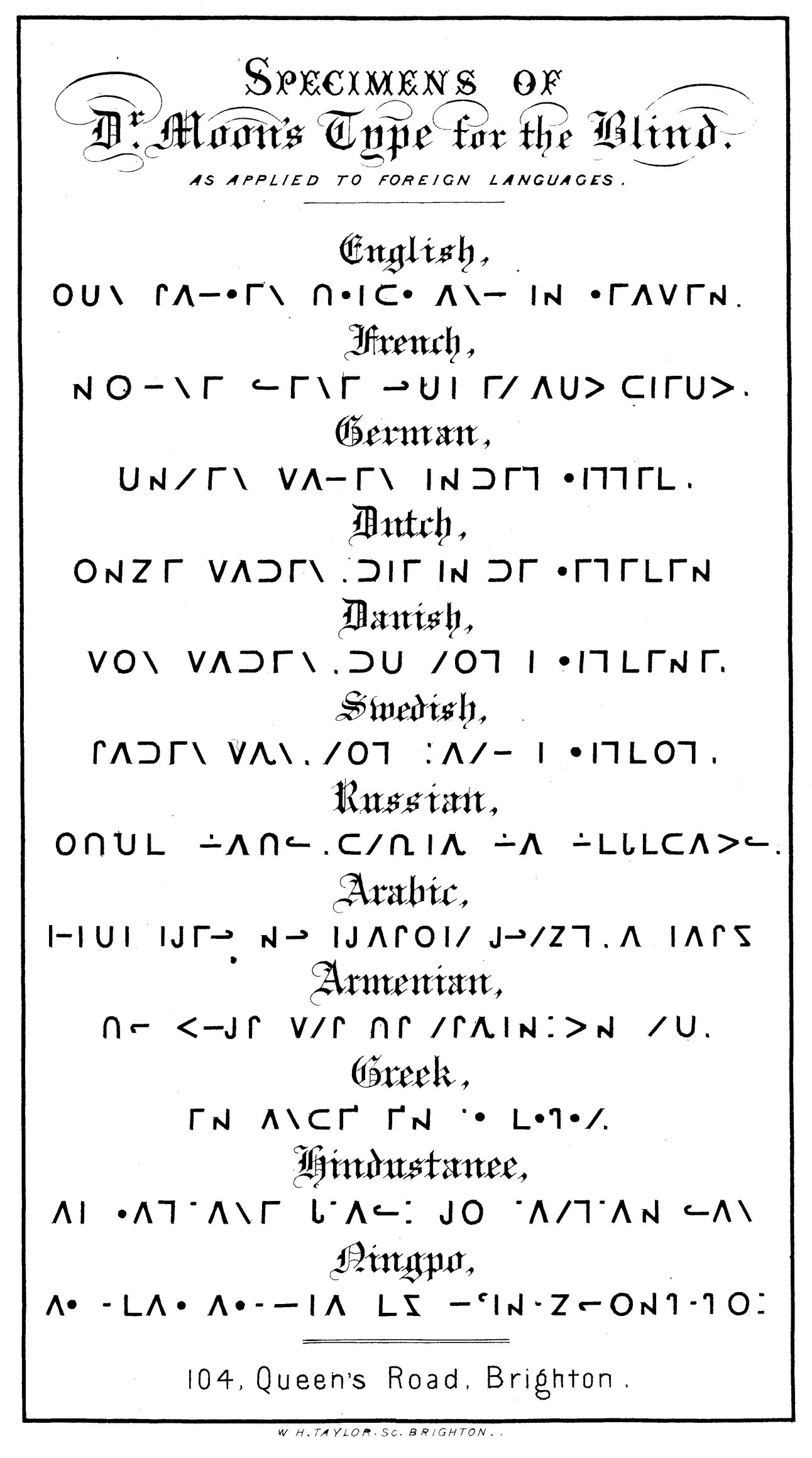
A sample of Moon type in various languages including Greek.

- Moon type is a simplification of the Latin alphabet for embossing. An adaptation for Greek-reading blind people has been proposed.
