= Nemeth Braille =

Braille code for mathematics and science

- Script type: Alphabet Braille code for encoding mathematical and scientific notation linearly
- Creator: Abraham Nemeth
- Period: 1952 to the present
- Languages: Several

The Nemeth Braille Code for Mathematics and Science Notation is a Braille code for encoding mathematical and scientific notation linearly using standard six-dot Braille cells for tactile reading by the visually impaired. The code was developed by Abraham Nemeth. The Nemeth Code was first written up in 1952. It was revised in 1956, 1965, and 1972. It is an example of a compact human-readable markup language.

Nemeth Braille is one code used to write mathematics in braille. There are many systems in use around the world.

== Principles of the Nemeth Code ==
The Nemeth Code Book (1972) opens with the following words:

This Braille Code for Mathematics and Science Notation has been prepared to provide a system of symbols which will allow technical literature to be presented and read in braille. The Code is intended to convey as accurate an impression as is possible to the braille reader of the corresponding printed text, and this is one of its principal features. When the braille reader has a clear conception of the corresponding printed text, the area of communication between himself and his teacher, his colleagues, his associates, and the world at large is greatly broadened. A test of the accuracy with which the Code conveys information from the print to the braille text is to effect a transcription in the reverse direction. The amount of agreement between the original printed text and one transcribed from the braille is a measure of the Code's accuracy.

—

One consequence is that the braille transcriber does not need to know the underlying mathematics. The braille transcriber needs to identify the inkprint symbols and know how to render them in Nemeth Code braille. For example, if the same math symbol might have two different meanings, this would not matter; both instances would be brailled the same. This is in contrast to the International Braille Music Code, where the braille depends on the meaning of the inkprint music. Thus a knowledge of music is required to produce braille music.

== Table of Nemeth braille codes ==
=== General signs ===
Symbol	*	,	...
Braille	⠈ (braille pattern dots-4) ⠼ (braille pattern dots-3456)	⠠ (braille pattern dots-6)	⠄ (braille pattern dots-3)

=== Number signs ===
Symbol	Number prefix	Decimal point	Thousands separator	0	1	2	3	4	5	6	7	8	9
Braille	⠼ (braille pattern dots-3456)	⠨ (braille pattern dots-46)	⠠ (braille pattern dots-6)	⠴ (braille pattern dots-356)	⠂ (braille pattern dots-2)	⠆ (braille pattern dots-23)	⠒ (braille pattern dots-25)	⠲ (braille pattern dots-256)	⠢ (braille pattern dots-26)	⠖ (braille pattern dots-235)	⠶ (braille pattern dots-2356)	⠦ (braille pattern dots-236)	⠔ (braille pattern dots-35)

=== Operators ===
Symbol	+	-	×	·	÷	. (decimal)	√	i√ (radical index)
Braille	⠬ (braille pattern dots-346)	⠤ (braille pattern dots-36)	⠈ (braille pattern dots-4) ⠡ (braille pattern dots-16)	⠡ (braille pattern dots-16)	⠨ (braille pattern dots-46) ⠌ (braille pattern dots-34)	⠨ (braille pattern dots-46)	⠜ (braille pattern dots-345)	⠣ (braille pattern dots-126)
Symbol	inner √ (1st)	inner √ (2nd)	end 1st √	end 2nd √	long division	/	!	
Braille	⠨ (braille pattern dots-46)	⠨ (braille pattern dots-46)	⠨ (braille pattern dots-46) ⠻ (braille pattern dots-12456)	⠨ (braille pattern dots-46) ⠻ (braille pattern dots-12456)	⠕ (braille pattern dots-135)	⠌ (braille pattern dots-34)	⠯ (braille pattern dots-12346)	

=== Parentheses and brackets ===
Symbol	(	)	[	]	{	}
Braille	⠷ (braille pattern dots-12356)	⠾ (braille pattern dots-23456)	⠈ (braille pattern dots-4) ⠷ (braille pattern dots-12356)	⠈ (braille pattern dots-4) ⠾ (braille pattern dots-23456)	⠨ (braille pattern dots-46) ⠷ (braille pattern dots-12356)	⠨ (braille pattern dots-46) ⠾ (braille pattern dots-23456)

=== Fractions ===
Symbol	simple			complex			hypercomplex			fraction in mixed number		
Symbol	open	line	close	open	line	close	open	line	close	open	line	close
Braille	⠹ (braille pattern dots-1456)	⠌ (braille pattern dots-34)	⠼ (braille pattern dots-3456)	⠠ (braille pattern dots-6) ⠹ (braille pattern dots-1456)	⠠ (braille pattern dots-6) ⠌ (braille pattern dots-34)	⠠ (braille pattern dots-6) ⠼ (braille pattern dots-3456)	⠠ (braille pattern dots-6) ⠹ (braille pattern dots-1456)	⠠ (braille pattern dots-6) ⠌ (braille pattern dots-34)	⠠ (braille pattern dots-6) ⠼ (braille pattern dots-3456)	⠸ (braille pattern dots-456) ⠹ (braille pattern dots-1456)	⠸ (braille pattern dots-456) ⠌ (braille pattern dots-34)	⠸ (braille pattern dots-456) ⠼ (braille pattern dots-3456)

=== Other modifiers ===
Symbol	∵	∴	:	∷	′	″
Braille	⠈ (braille pattern dots-4) ⠌ (braille pattern dots-34)	⠠ (braille pattern dots-6) ⠡ (braille pattern dots-16)	⠨ (braille pattern dots-46)	⠨ (braille pattern dots-46)	⠄ (braille pattern dots-3)	⠄ (braille pattern dots-3)

Symbol	∞	∝	°	%	✓
Braille	⠠ (braille pattern dots-6) ⠿ (braille pattern dots-123456)	⠸ (braille pattern dots-456) ⠿ (braille pattern dots-123456)	⠨ (braille pattern dots-46) ⠡ (braille pattern dots-16)	⠈ (braille pattern dots-4) ⠴ (braille pattern dots-356)	⠈ (braille pattern dots-4) ⠜ (braille pattern dots-345)

=== Braille indicators ===
Symbol	Punctuation	Superscript	Subscript	Baseline	Omission	Cancel (close)	Cancel (open)	Run Over	Directly Over	Directly Under	Beginning	Termination
Braille	⠸ (braille pattern dots-456)	⠘ (braille pattern dots-45)	⠰ (braille pattern dots-56)	⠐ (braille pattern dots-5)	⠿ (braille pattern dots-123456)	⠻ (braille pattern dots-12456)	⠪ (braille pattern dots-246)	⠐ (braille pattern dots-5)	⠣ (braille pattern dots-126)	⠩ (braille pattern dots-146)	⠐ (braille pattern dots-5)	⠻ (braille pattern dots-12456)

=== Comparison signs ===
Symbol	>	<	≥	≤	≧	≦
Braille	⠨ (braille pattern dots-46) ⠂ (braille pattern dots-2)	⠐ (braille pattern dots-5) ⠅ (braille pattern dots-13)	⠨ (braille pattern dots-46) ⠂ (braille pattern dots-2) ⠱ (braille pattern dots-156)	⠐ (braille pattern dots-5) ⠅ (braille pattern dots-13) ⠱ (braille pattern dots-156)	⠨ (braille pattern dots-46) ⠂ (braille pattern dots-2) ⠅ (braille pattern dots-13)	⠐ (braille pattern dots-5) ⠅ (braille pattern dots-13) ⠨ (braille pattern dots-46)

Symbol	⋝	⋜	⪚	⪙
Braille	⠱ (braille pattern dots-156) ⠨ (braille pattern dots-46) ⠂ (braille pattern dots-2)	⠱ (braille pattern dots-156) ⠐ (braille pattern dots-5) ⠅ (braille pattern dots-13)	⠨ (braille pattern dots-46) ⠅ (braille pattern dots-13) ⠂ (braille pattern dots-2)	⠨ (braille pattern dots-46) ⠅ (braille pattern dots-13) ⠐ (braille pattern dots-5)

Symbol	><	<>	>=<	<=>
Braille	⠨ (braille pattern dots-46) ⠂ (braille pattern dots-2) ⠐ (braille pattern dots-5) ⠅ (braille pattern dots-13)	⠐ (braille pattern dots-5) ⠅ (braille pattern dots-13) ⠨ (braille pattern dots-46) ⠂ (braille pattern dots-2)	⠨ (braille pattern dots-46) ⠂ (braille pattern dots-2) ⠅ (braille pattern dots-13) ⠐ (braille pattern dots-5)	⠐ (braille pattern dots-5) ⠅ (braille pattern dots-13) ⠨ (braille pattern dots-46) ⠂ (braille pattern dots-2)

Symbol	=	≠	≯	≮	~	≈	≅	±	∓
Braille	⠨ (braille pattern dots-46) ⠅ (braille pattern dots-13)	⠌ (braille pattern dots-34) ⠨ (braille pattern dots-46) ⠅ (braille pattern dots-13)	⠌ (braille pattern dots-34) ⠨ (braille pattern dots-46) ⠂ (braille pattern dots-2)	⠌ (braille pattern dots-34) ⠐ (braille pattern dots-5) ⠅ (braille pattern dots-13)	⠈ (braille pattern dots-4) ⠱ (braille pattern dots-156)	⠈ (braille pattern dots-4) ⠱ (braille pattern dots-156)	⠈ (braille pattern dots-4) ⠱ (braille pattern dots-156) ⠨ (braille pattern dots-46) ⠅ (braille pattern dots-13)	⠬ (braille pattern dots-346) ⠤ (braille pattern dots-36)	⠤ (braille pattern dots-36) ⠬ (braille pattern dots-346)

=== Geometry ===
Symbol	Parallel	Perpendicular	Angle	Right angle
Braille	⠫ (braille pattern dots-1246) ⠇ (braille pattern dots-123)	⠫ (braille pattern dots-1246) ⠏ (braille pattern dots-1234)	⠫ (braille pattern dots-1246) ⠪ (braille pattern dots-246)	⠫ (braille pattern dots-1246) ⠪ (braille pattern dots-246) ⠨ (braille pattern dots-46) ⠗ (braille pattern dots-1235) ⠻ (braille pattern dots-12456)

Symbol	Arc down	Arc up	Trapezoid	Square	Rectangle	Parallelogram
Braille	⠫ (braille pattern dots-1246) ⠁ (braille pattern dots-1)	⠫ (braille pattern dots-1246) ⠄ (braille pattern dots-3)	⠫ (braille pattern dots-1246) ⠟ (braille pattern dots-12345)	⠫ (braille pattern dots-1246) ⠲ (braille pattern dots-256)	⠫ (braille pattern dots-1246) ⠗ (braille pattern dots-1235)	⠫ (braille pattern dots-1246) ⠛ (braille pattern dots-1245)

Symbol	Rhombus	Isosceles trapezoid	Triangle	Right triangle	Circle	Ellipse
Braille	⠫ (braille pattern dots-1246) ⠓ (braille pattern dots-125)	⠫ (braille pattern dots-1246) ⠵ (braille pattern dots-1356)	⠫ (braille pattern dots-1246) ⠞ (braille pattern dots-2345)	⠫ (braille pattern dots-1246) ⠞ (braille pattern dots-2345) ⠨ (braille pattern dots-46) ⠗ (braille pattern dots-1235) ⠻ (braille pattern dots-12456)	⠫ (braille pattern dots-1246) ⠉ (braille pattern dots-14)	⠫ (braille pattern dots-1246) ⠑ (braille pattern dots-15)

=== Arrows ===
Symbol	⟶	⟵	⟷
Braille	⠫ (braille pattern dots-1246) ⠒ (braille pattern dots-25) ⠕ (braille pattern dots-135)	⠫ (braille pattern dots-1246) ⠪ (braille pattern dots-246) ⠒ (braille pattern dots-25)	⠫ (braille pattern dots-1246) ⠪ (braille pattern dots-246) ⠒ (braille pattern dots-25) ⠕ (braille pattern dots-135)

Symbol	→	⇌	⇒
Braille	⠫ (braille pattern dots-1246) ⠕ (braille pattern dots-135)	⠫ (braille pattern dots-1246) ⠒ (braille pattern dots-25) ⠈ (braille pattern dots-4) ⠕ (braille pattern dots-135) ⠠ (braille pattern dots-6) ⠪ (braille pattern dots-246)	⠫ (braille pattern dots-1246) ⠶ (braille pattern dots-2356) ⠕ (braille pattern dots-135)

=== Trig functions ===
Function	Sine	Cosine	Tangent
Braille	⠎ (braille pattern dots-234) ⠊ (braille pattern dots-24) ⠝ (braille pattern dots-1345)	⠉ (braille pattern dots-14) ⠕ (braille pattern dots-135) ⠎ (braille pattern dots-234)	⠞ (braille pattern dots-2345) ⠁ (braille pattern dots-1) ⠝ (braille pattern dots-1345)

Function	Secant	Cosecant	Cotangent	Logarithm
Braille	⠎ (braille pattern dots-234) ⠑ (braille pattern dots-15) ⠉ (braille pattern dots-14)	⠉ (braille pattern dots-14) ⠎ (braille pattern dots-234)	⠉ (braille pattern dots-14) ⠕ (braille pattern dots-135) ⠞ (braille pattern dots-2345)	⠇ (braille pattern dots-123) ⠕ (braille pattern dots-135) ⠛ (braille pattern dots-1245)

=== Set theory ===
Symbol	∈	∋	∪	∩	∅	{	}
Braille	⠈ (braille pattern dots-4) ⠑ (braille pattern dots-15)	⠈ (braille pattern dots-4) ⠢ (braille pattern dots-26)	⠨ (braille pattern dots-46) ⠬ (braille pattern dots-346)	⠨ (braille pattern dots-46) ⠩ (braille pattern dots-146)	⠸ (braille pattern dots-456) ⠦ (braille pattern dots-236)	⠨ (braille pattern dots-46) ⠷ (braille pattern dots-12356)	⠨ (braille pattern dots-46) ⠾ (braille pattern dots-23456)

Symbol	⊂	⊃	⊆	⊇
Braille	⠸ (braille pattern dots-456) ⠐ (braille pattern dots-5) ⠅ (braille pattern dots-13)	⠸ (braille pattern dots-456) ⠨ (braille pattern dots-46) ⠂ (braille pattern dots-2)	⠸ (braille pattern dots-456) ⠐ (braille pattern dots-5) ⠅ (braille pattern dots-13) ⠱ (braille pattern dots-156)	⠸ (braille pattern dots-456) ⠨ (braille pattern dots-46) ⠂ (braille pattern dots-2) ⠱ (braille pattern dots-156)

=== Misc. signs ===
Symbol	⊕	⊗	⊡
Braille	⠫ (braille pattern dots-1246) ⠉ (braille pattern dots-14) ⠸ (braille pattern dots-456) ⠬ (braille pattern dots-346) ⠻ (braille pattern dots-12456)	⠫ (braille pattern dots-1246) ⠉ (braille pattern dots-14) ⠸ (braille pattern dots-456) ⠡ (braille pattern dots-16) ⠻ (braille pattern dots-12456)	⠫ (braille pattern dots-1246) ⠲ (braille pattern dots-256) ⠸ (braille pattern dots-456) ⠡ (braille pattern dots-16) ⠻ (braille pattern dots-12456)

Symbol	Intersecting lines	@	Ditto	Tally mark	+-	-+
Braille	⠫ (braille pattern dots-1246) ⠊ (braille pattern dots-24)	⠈ (braille pattern dots-4) ⠁ (braille pattern dots-1)	⠠ (braille pattern dots-6) ⠄ (braille pattern dots-3)	⠸ (braille pattern dots-456)	⠬ (braille pattern dots-346) ⠐ (braille pattern dots-5) ⠤ (braille pattern dots-36)	⠤ (braille pattern dots-36) ⠐ (braille pattern dots-5) ⠬ (braille pattern dots-346)

Symbol	|	≃	≡	—	| | (modulus)	. dot
Braille	⠳ (braille pattern dots-1256)	⠈ (braille pattern dots-4) ⠱ (braille pattern dots-156)	⠸ (braille pattern dots-456) ⠇ (braille pattern dots-123)	⠱ (braille pattern dots-156)	⠳ (braille pattern dots-1256)	⠡ (braille pattern dots-16)

=== Polygons ===
Symbol	Pentagon	Hexagon	Heptagon	Octagon	Nonagon	$n$-agon
Braille	⠫ (braille pattern dots-1246) ⠢ (braille pattern dots-26)	⠫ (braille pattern dots-1246) ⠖ (braille pattern dots-235)	⠫ (braille pattern dots-1246) ⠶ (braille pattern dots-2356)	⠫ (braille pattern dots-1246) ⠦ (braille pattern dots-236)	⠫ (braille pattern dots-1246) ⠔ (braille pattern dots-35)	+ (Nemeth Braille of $n$)

=== Triangles ===
Symbol	Acute	Right	Isosceles	Obtuse	Scalene
Braille	⠫ (braille pattern dots-1246) ⠞ (braille pattern dots-2345) ⠨ (braille pattern dots-46) ⠁ (braille pattern dots-1) ⠻ (braille pattern dots-12456)	⠫ (braille pattern dots-1246) ⠞ (braille pattern dots-2345) ⠨ (braille pattern dots-46) ⠗ (braille pattern dots-1235) ⠻ (braille pattern dots-12456)	⠫ (braille pattern dots-1246) ⠞ (braille pattern dots-2345) ⠨ (braille pattern dots-46) ⠊ (braille pattern dots-24) ⠻ (braille pattern dots-12456)	⠫ (braille pattern dots-1246) ⠞ (braille pattern dots-2345) ⠨ (braille pattern dots-46) ⠕ (braille pattern dots-135) ⠻ (braille pattern dots-12456)	⠫ (braille pattern dots-1246) ⠞ (braille pattern dots-2345) ⠨ (braille pattern dots-46) ⠎ (braille pattern dots-234) ⠻ (braille pattern dots-12456)

=== Other signs ===
Symbol	Acute angle	Right angle	Obtuse angle	Hexagon star	¶	§
Braille	⠫ (braille pattern dots-1246) ⠪ (braille pattern dots-246) ⠨ (braille pattern dots-46) ⠁ (braille pattern dots-1) ⠻ (braille pattern dots-12456)	⠫ (braille pattern dots-1246) ⠪ (braille pattern dots-246) ⠨ (braille pattern dots-46) ⠗ (braille pattern dots-1235) ⠻ (braille pattern dots-12456)	⠫ (braille pattern dots-1246) ⠪ (braille pattern dots-246) ⠨ (braille pattern dots-46) ⠕ (braille pattern dots-135) ⠻ (braille pattern dots-12456)	⠫ (braille pattern dots-1246) ⠎ (braille pattern dots-234)	⠈ (braille pattern dots-4) ⠠ (braille pattern dots-6) ⠏ (braille pattern dots-1234)	⠈ (braille pattern dots-4) ⠠ (braille pattern dots-6) ⠎ (braille pattern dots-234)

Symbol	ref. indicator	italics	bold	letter sign	composite function	|det| matrix	∫	∂
Braille	⠈ (braille pattern dots-4) ⠻ (braille pattern dots-12456)	⠨ (braille pattern dots-46)	⠸ (braille pattern dots-456)	⠰ (braille pattern dots-56)	⠨ (braille pattern dots-46) ⠡ (braille pattern dots-16)	⠠ (braille pattern dots-6) ⠳ (braille pattern dots-1256)	⠮ (braille pattern dots-2346)	⠈ (braille pattern dots-4) ⠙ (braille pattern dots-145)

=== Greek letters and Latin letters ===
Greek and Latin letters are based on the assignments of International Greek Braille.

Symbol	small Latin letters	capital Latin letters	small Greek letters	capital Greek letters
Braille	(Braille of the letter)	+ (Braille of the letter)	+ (Braille of the letter)	+ (Braille of the letter)

== See also ==
- Gardner-Salinas braille
- WIMATS, application software to transcript mathematical and scientific text input into braille script.
