= Gardner–Salinas braille codes =

Tactile system for encoding mathematical and scientific notation

The Gardner–Salinas braille codes are a proposed method of encoding mathematical and scientific notation linearly using braille cells for tactile reading by the visually impaired. The most common form of Gardner–Salinas braille is the 8-cell variety, commonly called GS8. There is also a corresponding 6-cell form called GS6.

The codes were developed as a replacement for Nemeth Braille by John A. Gardner, a physicist at Oregon State University, and Norberto Salinas, an Argentinian mathematician. However, 15 years later Nemeth code was still the standard, with no further change as of 2024.

The Gardner–Salinas braille codes are an example of a compact human-readable markup language. The syntax is based on the LaTeX system for scientific typesetting.

== Table of Gardner–Salinas 8-dot (GS8) braille ==
The set of lower-case letters, the period, comma, semicolon, colon, exclamation mark, apostrophe, and opening and closing double quotes are the same as in Grade-2 English Braille.

=== Digits ===
Symbol	0?	0?	1	2	3	4	5	6	7	8	9
Braille	⠥ (braille pattern dots-136)	⠬ (braille pattern dots-346)	⠡ (braille pattern dots-16)	⠣ (braille pattern dots-126)	⠩ (braille pattern dots-146)	⠹ (braille pattern dots-1456)	⠱ (braille pattern dots-156)	⠫ (braille pattern dots-1246)	⠻ (braille pattern dots-12456)	⠳ (braille pattern dots-1256)	⠪ (braille pattern dots-246)

Apart from 0, this is the same as the Antoine notation used in French and Luxembourgish Braille. Sources disagree on 0. Both claimed forms are presented above. The second is the ISO form. Note however that ISO is concerned only with a one-to-one assignment between 8-dot braille and ASCII, and so has no particular connection to Gardner–Salinas braille.

=== Upper-case letters ===
GS8 upper-case letters are indicated by the same cell as standard English braille (and GS8) lower-case letters, with dot #7 added.

Symbol	A	B	C	D	E	F	G	H	I	J	K	L	M
Braille	⡁ (braille pattern dots-17)	⡃ (braille pattern dots-127)	⡉ (braille pattern dots-147)	⡙ (braille pattern dots-1457)	⡑ (braille pattern dots-157)	⡋ (braille pattern dots-1247)	⡛ (braille pattern dots-12457)	⡓ (braille pattern dots-1257)	⡊ (braille pattern dots-247)	⡚ (braille pattern dots-2457)	⡅ (braille pattern dots-137)	⡇ (braille pattern dots-1237)	⡍ (braille pattern dots-1347)
Symbol	N	O	P	Q	R	S	T	U	V	W	X	Y	Z
Braille	⡝ (braille pattern dots-13457)	⡕ (braille pattern dots-1357)	⡏ (braille pattern dots-12347)	⡟ (braille pattern dots-123457)	⡗ (braille pattern dots-12357)	⡎ (braille pattern dots-2347)	⡞ (braille pattern dots-23457)	⡥ (braille pattern dots-1367)	⡧ (braille pattern dots-12367)	⡺ (braille pattern dots-24567)	⡭ (braille pattern dots-13467)	⡽ (braille pattern dots-134567)	⡵ (braille pattern dots-13567)

Compare Luxembourgish Braille.

=== Greek letters ===
Dot 8 is added to the letter forms of International Greek Braille to derive Greek letters:

Symbol	α	β	γ	δ	ε	ζ	η	θ	ι	κ	λ	μ
Braille	⢁ (braille pattern dots-18)	⢃ (braille pattern dots-128)	⢛ (braille pattern dots-12458)	⢙ (braille pattern dots-1458)	⢑ (braille pattern dots-158)	⢵ (braille pattern dots-13568)	⢱ (braille pattern dots-1568)	⢹ (braille pattern dots-14568)	⢊ (braille pattern dots-248)	⢅ (braille pattern dots-138)	⢇ (braille pattern dots-1238)	⢍ (braille pattern dots-1348)
Symbol	ν	ξ	ο	π	ρ	σ	τ	υ	φ	χ	ψ	ω
Braille	⢝ (braille pattern dots-13458)	⢭ (braille pattern dots-13468)	⢕ (braille pattern dots-1358)	⢏ (braille pattern dots-12348)	⢗ (braille pattern dots-12358)	⢎ (braille pattern dots-2348)	⢞ (braille pattern dots-23458)	⢥ (braille pattern dots-1368)	⢋ (braille pattern dots-1248)	⢯ (braille pattern dots-123468)	⢽ (braille pattern dots-134568)	⢺ (braille pattern dots-24568)
Symbol	Γ	Δ	Θ	Λ	Ξ	Π	Σ	Υ	Φ	Ψ	Ω	
Braille	⣛ (braille pattern dots-124578)	⣙ (braille pattern dots-14578)	⣹ (braille pattern dots-145678)	⣇ (braille pattern dots-12378)	⣭ (braille pattern dots-134678)	⣏ (braille pattern dots-123478)	⣎ (braille pattern dots-23478)	⣥ (braille pattern dots-13678)	⣋ (braille pattern dots-12478)	⣽ (braille pattern dots-1345678)	⣺ (braille pattern dots-245678)	

=== Characters differing from English Braille ===
Symbol	Parentheses		Brackets		single quote		
Symbol	open	close	open	close	open	close	?
Braille	⢆ (braille pattern dots-238)	⡘ (braille pattern dots-457)	⣦ (braille pattern dots-23678)	⣴ (braille pattern dots-35678)	⣄ (braille pattern dots-378)	⠄ (braille pattern dots-3)	⠶ (braille pattern dots-2356)

The single quotation marks are the ASCII back tick ` and apostrophe '.

=== ASCII symbols and mathematical operators ===
Symbol	"	$	&	@	\	^	_	`	{	}	~
Braille	⣒ (braille pattern dots-2578)	⡼ (braille pattern dots-34567)	⠯ (braille pattern dots-12346)	⢌ (braille pattern dots-348)	⣡ (braille pattern dots-1678)	⡐ (braille pattern dots-57)	⢂ (braille pattern dots-28)	⣄ (braille pattern dots-378)	⣷ (braille pattern dots-1235678)	⣾ (braille pattern dots-2345678)	⣠ (braille pattern dots-678)
Symbol	#	%	*	+	/	<	=	>	×	·	÷
Braille	⠼ (braille pattern dots-3456)	⠮ (braille pattern dots-2346)	⢜ (braille pattern dots-3458)	⡒ (braille pattern dots-257)	⣌ (braille pattern dots-3478)	⢔ (braille pattern dots-358)	⣶ (braille pattern dots-235678)	⡢ (braille pattern dots-267)	⣂ (braille pattern dots-278)	⢒ (braille pattern dots-258)	⣐ (braille pattern dots-578)

=== Text symbols ===
Symbol	•	©	†	‡	£
Braille	⢷ (braille pattern dots-123568)	⢉ (braille pattern dots-148)	⢻ (braille pattern dots-124568)	⢿ (braille pattern dots-1234568)	⢼ (braille pattern dots-34568)

=== Math and science symbols ===
Symbol	≈	≅	≡	∝	|x| (abs. value)	∞	∫	line ∫	closed ∫
Braille	⡶ (braille pattern dots-23567)	⢶ (braille pattern dots-23568)	⣿ (braille pattern dots-12345678)	⣤ (braille pattern dots-3678)	...	⢓ (braille pattern dots-1258)	⣮ (braille pattern dots-234678)	⡮ (braille pattern dots-23467)	⢮ (braille pattern dots-23468)

Symbol	〈	〉	∇	∂	...	→	←	○	ℵ	∈	⇌
Braille	⣪ (braille pattern dots-24678)	⣕ (braille pattern dots-13578)	⣩ (braille pattern dots-14678)	⢩ (braille pattern dots-1468)	⢤ (braille pattern dots-368)	⡦ (braille pattern dots-2367)	⢴ (braille pattern dots-3568)	⢚ (braille pattern dots-2458)	⣱ (braille pattern dots-15678)	⣑ (braille pattern dots-1578)	⡾ (braille pattern dots-234567)

=== Markup ===
Symbol	Superscript	Subscript	Left-superscript	Left-subscript	Begin fraction	Denominator	End fraction	Over *
Braille	⠔ (braille pattern dots-35)	⠢ (braille pattern dots-26)	⣔ (braille pattern dots-3578)	⣢ (braille pattern dots-2678)	⠷ (braille pattern dots-12356)	⠌ (braille pattern dots-34)	⠾ (braille pattern dots-23456)	⠜ (braille pattern dots-345)

* Encodes the fraction-slash for the single adjacent digits/letters as numerator and denominator.

Symbol	√	complex radicand *		displayed equation **		math expressions **		hyperlink **	
Symbol	√	Open	Close	Open	Close	Open	Close	Open	Close
Braille	⢪ (braille pattern dots-2468)	⣆ (braille pattern dots-2378)	⣰ (braille pattern dots-5678)	⣧ (braille pattern dots-123678)	⣼ (braille pattern dots-345678)	⣖ (braille pattern dots-23578)	⣲ (braille pattern dots-25678)	⡖ (braille pattern dots-2357)	⢲ (braille pattern dots-2568)

* Used for any > 1 digit radicand.

** Used for markup to represent inkprint text.

Symbol	Array						
Symbol	Begin	End	End element	End line	vert. stack	horiz. combo	superposition
Braille	⢄ (braille pattern dots-38)	⡠ (braille pattern dots-67)	⡂ (braille pattern dots-27)	⡆ (braille pattern dots-237)	⡬ (braille pattern dots-3467)	⣬ (braille pattern dots-34678)	⢬ (braille pattern dots-3468)

Symbol	Misc. Symbol *				Modifiers			
Symbol	Begin	End	Quantity	Markup indicator	Inverted	Stroke/Not	Variant	Large
Braille	⡄ (braille pattern dots-37)	⡀ (braille pattern dots-7)	⠿ (braille pattern dots-123456)	⡤ (braille pattern dots-367)	⣀ (braille pattern dots-78)	⡌ (braille pattern dots-347)	⢡ (braille pattern dots-168)	⡿ (braille pattern dots-1234567)

=== Typeface indicators ===
Symbol	Script	Bold	Italic	Underline	Definable font 1	Fractur	Roman	Underline
Braille	⢈ (braille pattern dots-48)	⢘ (braille pattern dots-458)	⢨ (braille pattern dots-468)	⢸ (braille pattern dots-4568)	⣈ (braille pattern dots-478)	⣘ (braille pattern dots-4578)	⣨ (braille pattern dots-4678)	⣸ (braille pattern dots-45678)

The difference between the two underline markers is not explained.

=== Shape symbols ===
Symbol	⊥	∥	∠	Open Square	⊿
Braille	⢀ (braille pattern dots-8) ⣆ (braille pattern dots-2378)	⢰ (braille pattern dots-568) ⡆ (braille pattern dots-237)	⢀ (braille pattern dots-8) ⣔ (braille pattern dots-3578)	⢰ (braille pattern dots-568) ⣲ (braille pattern dots-25678)	⢰ (braille pattern dots-568) ⣄ (braille pattern dots-378)

=== Set theory ===
Symbol	∪	∩	⊂	⊃
Braille	⢰ (braille pattern dots-568) ⣰ (braille pattern dots-5678)	⢰ (braille pattern dots-568) ⢲ (braille pattern dots-2568)	⢰ (braille pattern dots-568) ⣒ (braille pattern dots-2578)	⢐ (braille pattern dots-58) ⣲ (braille pattern dots-25678)
