= Luxembourgish Braille =

Braille alphabet of the Luxembourgish language

- Script type: alphabet
- Print basis: Luxembourgish alphabet
- Languages: Luxembourgish

Related scripts
- Parent systems: Braille: French Braille; Luxembourgish Braille

Luxembourgish Braille is the braille alphabet of the Luxembourgish language. It is very close to French Braille, but uses eight-dot cells, with the extra pair of dots at the bottom of each cell to indicate capitalization and accent marks. It is the only eight-dot alphabet listed in UNESCO (2013). Children start off with the older six-dot script (UNESCO 1990), then switch to eight-dot cells when they start primary school and learn the numbers.

== Alphabet ==
The Luxembourgish Braille alphabet started off as a reduced set of the letters of the French Braille alphabet, the basic 26 plus three letters for print vowels with diacritics: ⠿ é, ⠫ ë, ⠜ ä. With the shift to eight-point script, these three acquired an extra dot at point 8. The letters are thus:

a	b	c	d	e	f	g	h	i	j
k	l	m	n	o	p	q	r	s	t
u	v	w	x	y	z	ä	ë	é	⠀ (braille pattern blank)

Dot-7 is added to form capitals:

A	B	C	D	E	F	G	H	I	J
K	L	M	N	O	P	Q	R	S	T
U	V	W	X	Y	Z	Ä	Ë	É	⠀ (braille pattern blank)

Apart from the accented letters, these are the letter forms of the Gardner–Salinas Braille code used for technical notation. The digits 1–9 (but not 0) are also as in Gardner–Salinas. However, Luxembourgish punctuation is quite different.

== Numbers ==
The Antoine notation being promoted in France is used for numbers. However, because there is no possibility of confusing these digits with the letters of the Luxembourgish alphabet, as there is with the French Braille alphabet, they are written without the French number sign ⟨⠠⟩. That is, in Luxembourgish Braille, numbers are simply written as they are in print, without requiring any special indication that they are numbers.

0	1	2	3	4	5	6	7	8	9

== Punctuation ==
The exclamation mark is unusual, and brackets are in effect capitalized braces.

,	.	!	'	?	;	:

... " ... "	... ( ... )	... { ... }	... [ ... ]

== Formatting ==
Formatting is used for emphasis and the like. There are no capitalization or number signs in eight-dot Luxembourgish Braille.
