= Braille pattern dots-35 =

Braille pattern

6-dot braille cells
⠀	⠁	⠃	⠉	⠙	⠑	⠋	⠛	⠓	⠊	⠚	⠈	⠘
⠄	⠅	⠇	⠍	⠝	⠕	⠏	⠟	⠗	⠎	⠞	⠌	⠜
⠤	⠥	⠧	⠭	⠽	⠵	⠯	⠿	⠷	⠮	⠾	⠬	⠼
⠠	⠡	⠣	⠩	⠹	⠱	⠫	⠻	⠳	⠪	⠺	⠨	⠸
shift down	⠂	⠆	⠒	⠲	⠢	⠖	⠶	⠦	⠔	⠴	⠐	⠰

The Braille pattern dots-35 ( ⠔ ) is a 6-dot braille cell with the bottom left and middle right dots raised, or an 8-dot braille cell with the lower-middle left and upper-middle right dots raised. It is represented by the Unicode code point U+2814, and in Braille ASCII with the number 9.

Character information
Preview	⠔ (braille pattern dots-35)	
Unicode name	BRAILLE PATTERN DOTS-35	
Encodings	decimal	hex
Unicode	10260	U+2814
UTF-8	226 160 148	E2 A0 94
Numeric character reference	&#10260;	&#x2814;
Braille ASCII	57	39

== Unified Braille ==
In unified international braille, the braille pattern dots-35 is used to represent unrounded, close or near-close, front to central vowel, such as /i/, /ɪ/, /ɪ̈/, or /ɨ/ when multiple letters correspond to these values, and is otherwise assigned as needed.

=== Table of unified braille values ===
French Braille	*, (math) ×, in, "si"
English Braille	in
English Contraction	in
German Braille	in
Bharati Braille	ई / ਈ / ઈ / ঈ / ଈ / ఈ / ಈ / ഈ / ஈ / ඊ / ی
IPA Braille	small capital modifier
Slovak Braille	* (asterisk)
Arabic Braille	ـٍ (tanwin)
Irish Braille	in
Thai Braille	่ (tone 1)

== Other braille ==
Japanese Braille	(w)o / を / ヲ
Korean Braille	-d / ㄷ
Mainland Chinese Braille	-a
Taiwanese Braille	wa, -ua / ㄨㄚ
Two-Cell Chinese Braille	r-, initial cell of -èr, -ér, -ěr
Nemeth Braille	9
Gardner Salinas Braille	superscript indicator
Algerian Braille	ﻻ

== Plus dots 7 and 8 ==
Related to Braille pattern dots-35 are Braille patterns 357, 358, and 3578, which are used in 8-dot braille systems, such as Gardner-Salinas and Luxembourgish Braille.

Character information
Preview	⡔ (braille pattern dots-357)		⢔ (braille pattern dots-358)		⣔ (braille pattern dots-3578)	
Unicode name	BRAILLE PATTERN DOTS-357		BRAILLE PATTERN DOTS-358		BRAILLE PATTERN DOTS-3578	
Encodings	decimal	hex	dec	hex	dec	hex
Unicode	10324	U+2854	10388	U+2894	10452	U+28D4
UTF-8	226 161 148	E2 A1 94	226 162 148	E2 A2 94	226 163 148	E2 A3 94
Numeric character reference	&#10324;	&#x2854;	&#10388;	&#x2894;	&#10452;	&#x28D4;

	dots 357	dots 358	dots 3578
Gardner Salinas Braille		< (less than sign)	left superscript

== Related 8-dot kantenji patterns ==
In the Japanese kantenji braille, the standard 8-dot Braille patterns 67, 167, 467, and 1467 are the patterns related to Braille pattern dots-35, since the two additional dots of kantenji patterns 035, 357, and 0357 are placed above the base 6-dot cell, instead of below, as in standard 8-dot braille.

Character information
Preview	⡠ (braille pattern dots-67)		⡡ (braille pattern dots-167)		⡨ (braille pattern dots-467)		⡩ (braille pattern dots-1467)	
Unicode name	BRAILLE PATTERN DOTS-67		BRAILLE PATTERN DOTS-167		BRAILLE PATTERN DOTS-467		BRAILLE PATTERN DOTS-1467	
Encodings	decimal	hex	dec	hex	dec	hex	dec	hex
Unicode	10336	U+2860	10337	U+2861	10344	U+2868	10345	U+2869
UTF-8	226 161 160	E2 A1 A0	226 161 161	E2 A1 A1	226 161 168	E2 A1 A8	226 161 169	E2 A1 A9
Numeric character reference	&#10336;	&#x2860;	&#10337;	&#x2861;	&#10344;	&#x2868;	&#10345;	&#x2869;

=== Kantenji using braille patterns 67, 167, 467, or 1467 ===
This listing includes kantenji using Braille pattern dots-35 for all 6349 kanji found in JIS C 6226-1978.

- - 貝

==== Variants and thematic compounds ====
- - selector 1 + を/貝 = 斥
- - を/貝 + selector 5 = 具
- - 数 + を/貝 = 乙
- - 比 + を/貝 = 斤

==== Compounds of 貝 ====
- - な/亻 + を/貝 = 債
- - 仁/亻 + を/貝 = 償
- - ふ/女 + を/貝 = 嬰
  - - れ/口 + ふ/女 + を/貝 = 嚶
  - - へ/⺩ + ふ/女 + を/貝 = 瓔
  - - い/糹/#2 + ふ/女 + を/貝 = 纓
- - す/発 + を/貝 = 買
  - - つ/土 + を/貝 = 売
    - - に/氵 + つ/土 + を/貝 = 涜
    - - つ/土 + つ/土 + を/貝 = 賣
      - - へ/⺩ + つ/土 + を/貝 = 牘
      - - そ/馬 + つ/土 + を/貝 = 犢
      - - め/目 + つ/土 + を/貝 = 覿
      - - し/巿 + つ/土 + を/貝 = 黷
- - り/分 + を/貝 = 貧
- - へ/⺩ + を/貝 = 責
  - - い/糹/#2 + を/貝 = 績
  - - の/禾 + を/貝 = 積
    - - や/疒 + の/禾 + を/貝 = 癪
  - - ぬ/力 + へ/⺩ + を/貝 = 勣
  - - れ/口 + へ/⺩ + を/貝 = 嘖
  - - ま/石 + へ/⺩ + を/貝 = 磧
  - - ち/竹 + へ/⺩ + を/貝 = 簀
  - - み/耳 + へ/⺩ + を/貝 = 蹟
- - め/目 + を/貝 = 費
- - ら/月 + を/貝 = 貿
- - ぬ/力 + を/貝 = 賀
- - 氷/氵 + を/貝 = 資
- - う/宀/#3 + を/貝 = 賓
  - - ふ/女 + う/宀/#3 + を/貝 = 嬪
  - - て/扌 + う/宀/#3 + を/貝 = 擯
  - - 心 + う/宀/#3 + を/貝 = 檳
  - - ほ/方 + う/宀/#3 + を/貝 = 殯
  - - い/糹/#2 + う/宀/#3 + を/貝 = 繽
- - よ/广 + を/貝 = 贋
- - か/金 + を/貝 = 鎖
- - 日 + を/貝 = 頃
  - - に/氵 + 日 + を/貝 = 潁
- - を/貝 + ぬ/力 = 則
  - - よ/广 + を/貝 + ぬ/力 = 厠
- - を/貝 + れ/口 = 員
  - - 龸 + を/貝 = 賞
  - - ほ/方 + を/貝 + れ/口 = 殞
  - - さ/阝 + を/貝 + れ/口 = 隕
- - を/貝 + 氷/氵 = 敗
- - を/貝 + と/戸 = 貞
  - - し/巿 + を/貝 + と/戸 = 幀
  - - ま/石 + を/貝 + と/戸 = 碵
  - - ね/示 + を/貝 + と/戸 = 禎
  - - ひ/辶 + を/貝 + と/戸 = 遉
- - を/貝 + ろ/十 = 財
- - を/貝 + こ/子 = 貢
  - - き/木 + を/貝 + こ/子 = 槓
  - - 火 + を/貝 + こ/子 = 熕
- - を/貝 + 比 = 貨
  - - を/貝 + 比 + selector 4 = 貲
- - を/貝 + ん/止 = 販
- - を/貝 + り/分 = 貪
- - を/貝 + て/扌 = 貯
- - を/貝 + よ/广 = 貰
- - を/貝 + き/木 = 貴
  - - も/門 + を/貝 + き/木 = 匱
  - - き/木 + を/貝 + き/木 = 櫃
  - - め/目 + を/貝 + き/木 = 瞶
  - - ち/竹 + を/貝 + き/木 = 簣
  - - せ/食 + を/貝 + き/木 = 饋
- - を/貝 + 囗 = 貸
  - - を/貝 + 囗 + ん/止 = 贇
- - を/貝 + は/辶 = 貼
- - を/貝 + に/氵 = 賃
- - を/貝 + ら/月 = 賄
- - を/貝 + み/耳 = 賊
- - を/貝 + け/犬 = 賛
  - - て/扌 + を/貝 + け/犬 = 攅
  - - い/糹/#2 + を/貝 + け/犬 = 纉
  - - え/訁 + を/貝 + け/犬 = 讃
  - - を/貝 + を/貝 + け/犬 = 贊
  - - か/金 + を/貝 + け/犬 = 鑚
- - を/貝 + 数 = 賜
- - を/貝 + ま/石 = 賠
- - を/貝 + す/発 = 賢
- - を/貝 + 日 = 賭
- - を/貝 + む/車 = 購
- - を/貝 + う/宀/#3 = 賽
- - を/貝 + お/頁 = 贄
- - を/貝 + ほ/方 = 贅
- - を/貝 + そ/馬 = 贈
  - - れ/口 + を/貝 + そ/馬 = 囎
- - を/貝 + つ/土 = 贖
- - ん/止 + を/貝 + を/貝 = 罌
- - を/貝 + を/貝 + を/貝 = 貭
- - と/戸 + 宿 + を/貝 = 屓
- - を/貝 + selector 4 + 囗 = 戝
- - に/氵 + 宿 + を/貝 = 潰
- - け/犬 + 宿 + を/貝 = 狽
- - へ/⺩ + 宿 + を/貝 = 瑣
- - え/訁 + 宿 + を/貝 = 讚
- - を/貝 + selector 2 + の/禾 = 貶
- - を/貝 + selector 4 + な/亻 = 貽
- - を/貝 + す/発 + れ/口 = 賂
- - を/貝 + selector 4 + つ/土 = 賍
- - を/貝 + き/木 + な/亻 = 賚
- - を/貝 + 宿 + 囗 = 賤
- - を/貝 + り/分 + け/犬 = 賺
- - を/貝 + selector 4 + て/扌 = 賻
- - を/貝 + 宿 + 日 = 贍
- - ⺼ + 宿 + を/貝 = 贏
- - を/貝 + ふ/女 + 火 = 贐
- - を/貝 + 宿 + す/発 = 贓
- - を/貝 + 宿 + を/貝 = 贔
- - か/金 + 宿 + を/貝 = 鑽
- - を/貝 + 龸 + せ/食 = 鵙
- - を/貝 + 宿 + せ/食 = 鸚
- - を/貝 + 龸 + さ/阝 = 齎

==== Compounds of 斥 ====
- - ゑ/訁 + を/貝 = 訴
- - て/扌 + selector 1 + を/貝 = 拆
- - に/氵 + selector 1 + を/貝 = 泝
- - き/木 + 龸 + を/貝 = 柝

==== Compounds of 具 ====
- - な/亻 + を/貝 + selector 5 = 倶
- - る/忄 + を/貝 + selector 5 = 惧
- - む/車 + を/貝 + selector 5 = 颶

==== Compounds of 乙 ====
- - せ/食 + を/貝 = 乱
- - ち/竹 + を/貝 = 乳
- - ろ/十 + を/貝 = 乾
- - こ/子 + を/貝 = 孔
  - - れ/口 + こ/子 + を/貝 = 吼
- - き/木 + を/貝 = 札
  - - い/糹/#2 + き/木 + を/貝 = 紮
- - や/疒 + 数 + を/貝 = 乢
- - て/扌 + 数 + を/貝 = 扎
- - せ/食 + せ/食 + を/貝 = 亂
- - い/糹/#2 + 宿 + を/貝 = 糺
- - む/車 + 宿 + を/貝 = 軋

==== Compounds of 斤 ====
- - も/門 + を/貝 = 匠
- - て/扌 + を/貝 = 折
  - - れ/口 + を/貝 = 哲
  - - え/訁 + を/貝 = 誓
  - - 日 + て/扌 + を/貝 = 晢
  - - に/氵 + て/扌 + を/貝 = 浙
- - と/戸 + を/貝 = 所
- - む/車 + を/貝 = 斬
  - - つ/土 + む/車 + を/貝 = 塹
  - - や/疒 + む/車 + を/貝 = 嶄
  - - る/忄 + む/車 + を/貝 = 慙
  - - き/木 + む/車 + を/貝 = 槧
  - - か/金 + む/車 + を/貝 = 鏨
  - - に/氵 + を/貝 = 漸
- - ま/石 + を/貝 = 新
- - ん/止 + を/貝 = 欣
  - - て/扌 + ん/止 + を/貝 = 掀
- - ね/示 + を/貝 = 祈
- - 心 + を/貝 = 芹
- - ひ/辶 + を/貝 = 近
- - を/貝 + の/禾 = 断
  - - を/貝 + を/貝 + の/禾 = 斷
- - を/貝 + を/貝 = 質
  - - み/耳 + を/貝 = 躓
- - れ/口 + 比 + を/貝 = 听
- - つ/土 + 比 + を/貝 = 圻
- - る/忄 + 比 + を/貝 = 忻
- - に/氵 + 比 + を/貝 = 沂
- - か/金 + 比 + を/貝 = 釿
- - れ/口 + 宿 + を/貝 = 嘶
- - て/扌 + 宿 + を/貝 = 撕
- - ま/石 + 宿 + を/貝 = 斫
- - き/木 + 宿 + を/貝 = 斯
