= Braille pattern dots-256 =

Braille pattern

6-dot braille cells
⠀	⠁	⠃	⠉	⠙	⠑	⠋	⠛	⠓	⠊	⠚	⠈	⠘
⠄	⠅	⠇	⠍	⠝	⠕	⠏	⠟	⠗	⠎	⠞	⠌	⠜
⠤	⠥	⠧	⠭	⠽	⠵	⠯	⠿	⠷	⠮	⠾	⠬	⠼
⠠	⠡	⠣	⠩	⠹	⠱	⠫	⠻	⠳	⠪	⠺	⠨	⠸
shift down	⠂	⠆	⠒	⠲	⠢	⠖	⠶	⠦	⠔	⠴	⠐	⠰

The Braille pattern dots-256 ( ⠲ ) is a 6-dot braille cell with both middle, and the bottom right dots raised, or an 8-dot braille cell with both upper-middle, and the lower-middle right dots raised. It is represented by the Unicode code point U+2832, and in Braille ASCII with the number 4.

Character information
Preview	⠲ (braille pattern dots-256)	
Unicode name	BRAILLE PATTERN DOTS-256	
Encodings	decimal	hex
Unicode	10290	U+2832
UTF-8	226 160 178	E2 A0 B2
Numeric character reference	&#10290;	&#x2832;
Braille ASCII	52	34

== Unified Braille ==
In unified international braille, the braille pattern dots-256 is used to represent punctuation, and otherwise as needed.

=== Table of unified braille values ===
French Braille	. (period), dis-, ien, "dès"
English Braille	. (period)
English Contraction	dis-
German Braille	un
Bharati Braille	. (period)
IPA Braille	retroflex tail or letter rotation mark
Russian Braille	. (period)
Slovak Braille	. (period)
Arabic Braille	. (period)
Irish Braille	dis
Thai Braille	้ (tone 2)

== Other braille ==
Japanese Braille	gō-yōon + dakuten
Korean Braille	-p / ㅍ
Mainland Chinese Braille	weng, -ong
Taiwanese Braille	yun, -ün / ㄩㄣ
Two-Cell Chinese Braille	yu-
Nemeth Braille	4

== Plus dots 7 and 8 ==
Related to Braille pattern dots-256 are Braille patterns 2567, 2568, and 25678, which are used in 8-dot braille systems, such as Gardner-Salinas and Luxembourgish Braille.

Character information
Preview	⡲ (braille pattern dots-2567)		⢲ (braille pattern dots-2568)		⣲ (braille pattern dots-25678)	
Unicode name	BRAILLE PATTERN DOTS-2567		BRAILLE PATTERN DOTS-2568		BRAILLE PATTERN DOTS-25678	
Encodings	decimal	hex	dec	hex	dec	hex
Unicode	10354	U+2872	10418	U+28B2	10482	U+28F2
UTF-8	226 161 178	E2 A1 B2	226 162 178	E2 A2 B2	226 163 178	E2 A3 B2
Numeric character reference	&#10354;	&#x2872;	&#10418;	&#x28B2;	&#10482;	&#x28F2;

	dots 2567	dots 2568	dots 25678
Gardner Salinas Braille			close math expression / hyperlink

== Related 8-dot kantenji patterns ==
In the Japanese kantenji braille, the standard 8-dot Braille patterns 368, 1368, 3468, and 13468 are the patterns related to Braille pattern dots-256, since the two additional dots of kantenji patterns 0256, 2567, and 02567 are placed above the base 6-dot cell, instead of below, as in standard 8-dot braille.

Character information
Preview	⢤ (braille pattern dots-368)		⢥ (braille pattern dots-1368)		⢬ (braille pattern dots-3468)		⢭ (braille pattern dots-13468)	
Unicode name	BRAILLE PATTERN DOTS-368		BRAILLE PATTERN DOTS-1368		BRAILLE PATTERN DOTS-3468		BRAILLE PATTERN DOTS-13468	
Encodings	decimal	hex	dec	hex	dec	hex	dec	hex
Unicode	10404	U+28A4	10405	U+28A5	10412	U+28AC	10413	U+28AD
UTF-8	226 162 164	E2 A2 A4	226 162 165	E2 A2 A5	226 162 172	E2 A2 AC	226 162 173	E2 A2 AD
Numeric character reference	&#10404;	&#x28A4;	&#10405;	&#x28A5;	&#10412;	&#x28AC;	&#10413;	&#x28AD;

=== Kantenji using braille patterns 368, 1368, 3468, or 13468 ===
This listing includes kantenji using Braille pattern dots-256 for all 6349 kanji found in JIS C 6226-1978.

Unlike most kantenji patterns, is distinguished positionally, where it usually indicates a 心 when used finally, but ⽊ or ⺾ when used initially, and any of the above when medial to a kantenji pattern. ⽊ and ⺾ are also indicated by other, unique kantenji cells, but the large number of kanji utilizing these elements necessitates further disambiguating in kantenji patterns, which are limited to three cells apiece.

- - 心

==== Variants and thematic compounds ====
- - selector 6 + 心 = 奄
- - 心 + selector 1 = 桜
- - 心 + selector 2 = 菊
- - 心 + selector 3 = 粟
- - 心 + selector 5 = 必
- - 心 + selector 6 = 黍

==== Compounds of 心 ====
- - ぬ/力 + 心 = 忍
  - - い/糹/#2 + ぬ/力 + 心 = 綛
  - - 心 + ぬ/力 + 心 = 荵
- - つ/土 + 心 = 志
  - - ゑ/訁 + 心 = 誌
  - - や/疒 + つ/土 + 心 = 痣
- - ほ/方 + 心 = 忘
- - よ/广 + 心 = 応
  - - よ/广 + よ/广 + 心 = 應
    - - み/耳 + よ/广 + 心 = 軈
- - 宿 + 心 = 忠
- - り/分 + 心 = 念
  - - き/木 + り/分 + 心 = 棯
  - - の/禾 + り/分 + 心 = 稔
  - - せ/食 + り/分 + 心 = 鯰
- - 数 + 心 = 忽
  - - る/忄 + 心 = 惚
- - ふ/女 + 心 = 怒
- - た/⽥ + 心 = 思
  - - ⺼ + た/⽥ + 心 = 腮
  - - お/頁 + た/⽥ + 心 = 顋
  - - せ/食 + た/⽥ + 心 = 鰓
- - な/亻 + 心 = 怠
- - さ/阝 + 心 = 怨
- - こ/子 + 心 = 怱
  - - 心 + 心 = 葱
- - え/訁 + 心 = 恋
  - - え/訁 + え/訁 + 心 = 戀
- - 龸 + 心 = 恐
- - み/耳 + 心 = 恥
- - け/犬 + 心 = 恩
- - め/目 + 心 = 息
  - - 火 + め/目 + 心 = 熄
- - む/車 + 心 = 恵
  - - む/車 + む/車 + 心 = 惠
- - れ/口 + 心 = 患
- - selector 1 + 心 = 悪
  - - selector 1 + selector 1 + 心 = 惡
    - - か/金 + selector 1 + 心 = 鐚
- - 火 + 心 = 悲
- - も/門 + 心 = 悶
- - 囗 + 心 = 惑
- - き/木 + 心 = 想
- - く/艹 + 心 = 愚
- - ひ/辶 + 心 = 感
  - - て/扌 + ひ/辶 + 心 = 撼
  - - む/車 + ひ/辶 + 心 = 轗
- - ゐ/幺 + 心 = 慈
- - ら/月 + 心 = 態
- - と/戸 + 心 = 慰
- - の/禾 + 心 = 愁
- - す/発 + 心 = 慮
  - - に/氵 + す/発 + 心 = 濾
  - - か/金 + す/発 + 心 = 鑢
- - そ/馬 + 心 = 慶
- - せ/食 + 心 = 憩
  - - せ/食 + せ/食 + 心 = 憇
- - う/宀/#3 + 心 = 憲
- - や/疒 + 心 = 懇
- - ゆ/彳 + 心 = 懲
- - き/木 + 心 + 心 = 蕊
- - く/艹 + 心 + 心 = 蘂
- - り/分 + 宿 + 心 = 忿
- - ふ/女 + 宿 + 心 = 恕
- - つ/土 + 宿 + 心 = 恚
- - ち/竹 + 宿 + 心 = 悉
- - ゆ/彳 + 宿 + 心 = 愈
- - み/耳 + 宿 + 心 = 慇
- - け/犬 + 宿 + 心 = 慧
- - そ/馬 + 宿 + 心 = 憑
- - ぬ/力 + 宿 + 心 = 懃
- - に/氵 + 宿 + 心 = 沁
- - む/車 + 宿 + 心 = 蟋

==== Compounds of 奄 ====
- - 仁/亻 + 心 = 俺
- - て/扌 + 心 = 掩
- - ま/石 + 心 = 竜
  - - に/氵 + 心 = 滝
  - - ま/石 + ま/石 + 心 = 龍
    - - つ/土 + ま/石 + 心 = 壟
    - - へ/⺩ + ま/石 + 心 = 瓏
    - - ち/竹 + ま/石 + 心 = 籠
    - - 心 + ま/石 + 心 = 蘢
    - - さ/阝 + ま/石 + 心 = 隴
  - - き/木 + ま/石 + 心 = 槞
- - ち/竹 + 心 = 電
- - に/氵 + selector 6 + 心 = 淹
- - く/艹 + selector 6 + 心 = 菴
- - も/門 + selector 6 + 心 = 閹

==== Compounds of 桜 and ⽊ ====
- - 心 + う/宀/#3 = 杉
  - - き/木 + 心 + う/宀/#3 = 彬
- - 心 + れ/口 = 杏
- - 心 + こ/子 = 松
  - - に/氵 + 心 + こ/子 = 淞
  - - 心 + 心 + こ/子 = 菘
  - - と/戸 + 心 + こ/子 = 鬆
  - - 心 + 心 + こ/子 = 菘
- - 心 + 日 = 柏
- - 心 + さ/阝 = 柳
- - 心 + し/巿 = 柿
- - 心 + 宿 = 桃
- - 心 + と/戸 = 桐
- - 心 + ゑ/訁 = 桑
- - 心 + り/分 = 桧
  - - 心 + 心 + り/分 = 檜
- - 心 + は/辶 = 梅
- - 心 + ろ/十 = 梓
- - 心 + け/犬 = 椅
- - 心 + む/車 = 楓
- - 心 + お/頁 = 榎
- - 心 + て/扌 = 欅
- - 心 + 心 + selector 1 = 櫻
- - 心 + 宿 + こ/子 = 李
- - 心 + き/木 + う/宀/#3 = 杜
- - 心 + 数 + き/木 = 杞
- - 心 + 龸 + 数 = 杤
- - 心 + 龸 + ひ/辶 = 杷
- - 心 + 龸 + 比 = 枇
- - 心 + 宿 + ほ/方 = 枋
- - 心 + 龸 + り/分 = 枌
- - 心 + selector 6 + こ/子 = 枩
- - 心 + れ/口 + は/辶 = 枳
- - 心 + も/門 + selector 5 = 枸
- - 心 + す/発 + selector 1 = 柊
- - 心 + selector 4 + る/忄 = 柑
- - 心 + う/宀/#3 + ま/石 = 柘
- - 心 + た/⽥ + selector 4 = 柚
- - 心 + 宿 + さ/阝 = 柞
- - 心 + ん/止 + い/糹/#2 = 柾
- - 心 + 比 + は/辶 = 栂
- - 心 + 数 + ま/石 = 栃
- - 心 + 数 + め/目 = 栢
- - 心 + 龸 + む/車 = 栩
- - 心 + ふ/女 + selector 4 = 栴
- - 心 + 宿 + つ/土 = 桂
- - 心 + お/頁 + selector 1 = 桾
- - 心 + 宿 + れ/口 = 梔
- - 心 + 日 + な/亻 = 梗
- - 心 + 宿 + な/亻 = 梛
- - 心 + ら/月 + れ/口 = 梧
- - 心 + の/禾 + ぬ/力 = 梨
- - 心 + 宿 + め/目 = 棉
- - 心 + う/宀/#3 + ね/示 = 棕
- - 心 + き/木 + 数 = 棘
- - 心 + selector 6 + は/辶 = 棠
- - 心 + 龸 + ゆ/彳 = 棣
- - 心 + 龸 + れ/口 = 椋
- - 心 + 宿 + い/糹/#2 = 椎
- - 心 + selector 1 + selector 1 = 椏
- - 心 + う/宀/#3 + ゑ/訁 = 椒
- - 心 + 龸 + も/門 = 椚
- - 心 + み/耳 + さ/阝 = 椰
- - 心 + も/門 + selector 6 = 椶
- - 心 + selector 1 + き/木 = 椹
- - 心 + け/犬 + 日 = 椿
- - 心 + 宿 + 数 = 楊
- - 心 + selector 1 + よ/广 = 楙
- - 心 + き/木 + き/木 = 楚
- - 心 + selector 6 + ら/月 = 楜
- - 心 + 比 + ひ/辶 = 楝
- - 心 + 比 + み/耳 = 楠
- - 心 + selector 5 + ゆ/彳 = 楡
- - 心 + せ/食 + selector 6 = 楢
- - 心 + と/戸 + 日 = 楮
- - 心 + る/忄 + き/木 = 楳
- - 心 + ま/石 + し/巿 = 楴
- - 心 + の/禾 + 火 = 楸
- - 心 + う/宀/#3 + ゆ/彳 = 榁
- - 心 + ね/示 + し/巿 = 榊
- - 心 + selector 4 + て/扌 = 榑
- - 心 + や/疒 + さ/阝 = 榔
- - 心 + け/犬 + の/禾 = 榛
- - 心 + 龸 + 日 = 榠
- - 心 + 宿 + も/門 = 榧
- - 心 + 宿 + ⺼ = 榲
- - 心 + ら/月 + た/⽥ = 榴
- - 心 + か/金 + ら/月 = 榾
- - 心 + selector 5 + や/疒 = 榿
- - 心 + お/頁 + に/氵 = 槐
- - 心 + selector 1 + め/目 = 槙
- - 心 + ひ/辶 + う/宀/#3 = 槭
- - 心 + 囗 + selector 6 = 槲
- - 心 + け/犬 + 宿 = 槻
- - 心 + 宿 + き/木 = 槿
- - 心 + ゆ/彳 + よ/广 = 樅
- - 心 + う/宀/#3 + や/疒 = 樒
- - 心 + ち/竹 + selector 1 = 樗
- - 心 + ま/石 + ろ/十 = 樟
- - 心 + つ/土 + す/発 = 樫
- - 心 + く/艹 + か/金 = 樺
- - 心 + み/耳 + 氷/氵 = 橄
- - 心 + 宿 + よ/广 = 橘
- - 心 + す/発 + と/戸 = 橙
- - 心 + そ/馬 + selector 6 = 橡
- - 心 + 宿 + た/⽥ = 橿
- - 心 + 龸 + 囗 = 檀
- - 心 + selector 1 + な/亻 = 檍
- - 心 + 宿 + り/分 = 檎
- - 心 + 龸 + ま/石 = 檗
- - 心 + 日 + ゐ/幺 = 檪
- - 心 + 宿 + そ/馬 = 檬
- - 心 + う/宀/#3 + を/貝 = 檳
- - 心 + 宿 + て/扌 = 檸
- - 心 + う/宀/#3 + む/車 = 櫁
- - 心 + selector 6 + み/耳 = 櫚
- - 心 + ゐ/幺 + そ/馬 = 櫞
- - 心 + 宿 + 日 = 櫟
- - 心 + 龸 + た/⽥ = 櫨
- - 心 + め/目 + す/発 = 欖
- - 心 + け/犬 + め/目 = 欟

==== Compounds of 菊 and ⺾ ====
- - 心 + め/目 = 艾
- - 心 + か/金 = 芋
- - 心 + の/禾 = 芝
- - 心 + 仁/亻 = 芥
- - 心 + を/貝 = 芹
- - 心 + な/亻 = 苔
- - 心 + 比 = 苺
- - 心 + よ/广 = 茅
- - 心 + 氷/氵 = 茜
- - 心 + ん/止 = 茨
- - 心 + き/木 = 茶
- - 心 + み/耳 = 茸
- - 心 + ら/月 = 菅
- - 心 + く/艹 = 菱
- - 心 + 火 = 萩
- - 心 + い/糹/#2 = 葦
- - 心 + 心 = 葱
- - 心 + す/発 = 葵
- - 心 + ほ/方 = 蓬
- - 心 + ひ/辶 = 蓮
- - 心 + せ/食 = 蔦
- - 心 + 龸 = 蕨
- - 心 + ぬ/力 = 薊
- - 心 + ⺼ = 藍
- - 心 + ふ/女 = 藤
  - - 心 + 心 + ふ/女 = 籐
- - 心 + た/⽥ = 蘆
- - 心 + そ/馬 = 蘇
- - 心 + も/門 = 蘭
- - て/扌 + 心 + selector 2 = 掬
- - 心 + 心 + selector 2 = 椈
- - と/戸 + 心 + selector 2 = 鞠
- - 心 + 比 + も/門 = 芍
- - 心 + selector 5 + ほ/方 = 芒
- - 心 + selector 3 + け/犬 = 芙
- - 心 + 宿 + と/戸 = 芦
- - 心 + selector 1 + 宿 = 芫
- - 心 + 宿 + ひ/辶 = 芭
- - く/艹 + 宿 + 心 = 芯
- - 心 + 仁/亻 + ろ/十 = 苓
- - 心 + ま/石 + selector 1 = 苙
- - 心 + 龸 + め/目 = 苜
- - 心 + selector 4 + も/門 = 苡
- - 心 + 数 + て/扌 = 苧
- - 心 + り/分 + か/金 = 苹
- - 心 + ぬ/力 + れ/口 = 茄
- - 心 + さ/阝 + う/宀/#3 = 茆
- - 心 + き/木 + selector 5 = 茉
- - 心 + ほ/方 + れ/口 = 茗
- - 心 + selector 4 + ぬ/力 = 茘
- - 心 + な/亻 + け/犬 = 茯
- - 心 + selector 5 + か/金 = 茱
- - 心 + 日 + す/発 = 荀
- - 心 + り/分 + 囗 = 荅
- - 心 + ね/示 + ね/示 = 荊
- - 心 + 仁/亻 + に/氵 = 荏
- - 心 + selector 5 + と/戸 = 荳
- - 心 + 宿 + 火 = 荻
- - 心 + り/分 + も/門 = 荼
- - 心 + 宿 + ぬ/力 = 莉
- - 心 + 氷/氵 + ほ/方 = 莎
- - 心 + 龸 + は/辶 = 莓
- - 心 + う/宀/#3 + 宿 = 莞
- - 心 + の/禾 + ゐ/幺 = 莠
- - 心 + 比 + や/疒 = 莨
- - 心 + 囗 + selector 1 = 莪
- - 心 + き/木 + な/亻 = 莱
- - 心 + そ/馬 + う/宀/#3 = 莵
- - 心 + し/巿 + せ/食 = 菁
- - 心 + 日 + 比 = 菎
- - 心 + り/分 + 日 = 菖
- - 心 + ぬ/力 + 宿 = 菟
- - 心 + に/氵 + ひ/辶 = 菠
- - 心 + 宿 + ま/石 = 菩
- - 心 + 龸 + き/木 = 菫
- - 心 + こ/子 + こ/子 = 菰
- - 心 + selector 4 + 火 = 菲
- - 心 + う/宀/#3 + き/木 = 菻
- - 心 + 宿 + ゑ/訁 = 菽
- - 心 + 龸 + と/戸 = 萄
- - 心 + selector 4 + と/戸 = 萇
- - 心 + う/宀/#3 + そ/馬 = 萓
- - 心 + の/禾 + と/戸 = 萪
- - 心 + う/宀/#3 + 日 = 萱
- - 心 + 宿 + か/金 = 萵
- - 心 + 宿 + ゆ/彳 = 萸
- - 心 + ゆ/彳 + ふ/女 = 葎
- - 心 + 宿 + 氷/氵 = 葛
- - 心 + 龸 + ほ/方 = 葡
- - 心 + れ/口 + ろ/十 = 葫
- - 心 + 龸 + の/禾 = 葭
- - 心 + selector 4 + の/禾 = 葮
- - 心 + ほ/方 + ち/竹 = 葹
- - 心 + へ/⺩ + selector 2 = 蒋
- - 心 + 宿 + ね/示 = 蒜
- - 心 + う/宀/#3 + も/門 = 蒟
- - 心 + selector 4 + ほ/方 = 蒡
- - 心 + に/氵 + ほ/方 = 蒲
- - 心 + り/分 + け/犬 = 蒹
- - 心 + ゆ/彳 + ゆ/彳 = 蒻
- - 心 + 比 + え/訁 = 蒿
- - 心 + う/宀/#3 + た/⽥ = 蓉
- - 心 + と/戸 + selector 2 = 蓍
- - 心 + 宿 + 比 = 蓖
- - 心 + う/宀/#3 + て/扌 = 蓴
- - 心 + む/車 + selector 2 = 蓼
- - 心 + 宿 + 宿 = 蓿
- - 心 + 龸 + す/発 = 蔆
- - 心 + 宿 + ふ/女 = 蔔
- - 心 + よ/广 + と/戸 = 蔗
- - 心 + よ/广 + く/艹 = 蔬
- - 心 + 数 + 数 = 蕀
- - 心 + れ/口 + し/巿 = 蕁
- - 心 + 日 + ろ/十 = 蕈
- - 心 + い/糹/#2 + 火 = 蕉
- - 心 + 宿 + の/禾 = 蕎
- - 心 + け/犬 + せ/食 = 蕕
- - 心 + み/耳 + れ/口 = 蕗
- - 心 + selector 5 + 龸 = 蕣
- - 心 + む/車 + 火 = 蕪
- - 心 + ぬ/力 + ゆ/彳 = 蕭
- - 心 + お/頁 + よ/广 = 蕷
- - 心 + に/氵 + ⺼ = 薀
- - 心 + ゆ/彳 + 氷/氵 = 薇
- - 心 + の/禾 + す/発 = 薐
- - 心 + 宿 + は/辶 = 薑
- - 心 + 囗 + れ/口 = 薔
- - 心 + ろ/十 + ま/石 = 薛
- - 心 + 龸 + 火 = 薤
- - 心 + す/発 + 日 = 薯
- - 心 + さ/阝 + 龸 = 薺
- - 心 + う/宀/#3 + の/禾 = 藜
- - 心 + ゑ/訁 + 日 = 藷
- - 心 + う/宀/#3 + い/糹/#2 = 藺
- - 心 + 宿 + に/氵 = 藻
- - 心 + お/頁 + 数 = 藾
- - 心 + ん/止 + お/頁 = 蘋
- - 心 + 龸 + そ/馬 = 蘓
- - 心 + selector 6 + ま/石 = 蘗
- - 心 + せ/食 + そ/馬 = 蘚
- - 心 + す/発 + い/糹/#2 = 蘿
- - 心 + う/宀/#3 + 火 = 韮

==== Compounds of 粟 ====
- - 心 + に/氵 = 栗
  - - ち/竹 + 心 + に/氵 = 篥
  - - 心 + に/氵 + ね/示 = 瓢

==== Compounds of 必 ====
- - 氷/氵 + 心 = 泌
- - へ/⺩ + 心 = 瑟
- - え/訁 + 心 + selector 5 = 謐

==== Other compounds ====
- - ね/示 + 心 = 襲
- - 心 + つ/土 = 瓜
  - - れ/口 + 心 + つ/土 = 呱
  - - き/木 + 心 + つ/土 = 柧
  - - け/犬 + 心 + つ/土 = 瓠
  - - む/車 + 心 + つ/土 = 瓣
- - 心 + ま/石 = 麻
  - - れ/口 + 心 + ま/石 = 嘛
  - - や/疒 + 心 + ま/石 = 痲
  - - の/禾 + 心 + ま/石 = 糜
  - - い/糹/#2 + 心 + ま/石 = 縻
  - - ゐ/幺 + 心 + ま/石 = 麼
- - に/氵 + に/氵 + 心 = 瀧
- - 心 + た/⽥ + さ/阝 = 稗
- - 心 + 宿 + す/発 = 稷
- - 心 + ろ/十 + よ/广 = 笹
- - 心 + す/発 + き/木 = 篠
