= Braille pattern dots-1256 =

Braille pattern

6-dot braille cells
⠀	⠁	⠃	⠉	⠙	⠑	⠋	⠛	⠓	⠊	⠚	⠈	⠘
⠄	⠅	⠇	⠍	⠝	⠕	⠏	⠟	⠗	⠎	⠞	⠌	⠜
⠤	⠥	⠧	⠭	⠽	⠵	⠯	⠿	⠷	⠮	⠾	⠬	⠼
⠠	⠡	⠣	⠩	⠹	⠱	⠫	⠻	⠳	⠪	⠺	⠨	⠸
shift down	⠂	⠆	⠒	⠲	⠢	⠖	⠶	⠦	⠔	⠴	⠐	⠰

The Braille pattern dots-1256 ( ⠳ ) is a 6-dot braille cell with the top left, both middle, and bottom right dots raised, or an 8-dot braille cell with the top left, both upper-middle, and lower-middle right dots raised. It is represented by the Unicode code point U+2833, and in Braille ASCII with a backslash: \.

Character information
Preview	⠳ (braille pattern dots-1256)	
Unicode name	BRAILLE PATTERN DOTS-1256	
Encodings	decimal	hex
Unicode	10291	U+2833
UTF-8	226 160 179	E2 A0 B3
Numeric character reference	&#10291;	&#x2833;
Braille ASCII	92	5C

== Unified Braille ==
In unified international braille, the braille pattern dots-1256 is used to represent a close back vowel, such as /u/ or /ɯ/ when multiple letters correspond to these values, and is otherwise assigned as needed.

=== Table of unified braille values ===
French Braille	Ü, mathematical 8, ou
English Braille	Ou
English Contraction	out
German Braille	Ü
Bharati Braille	ऊ / ਊ / ઊ / ঊ / ଊ / ఊ / ಊ / ഊ / ஊ / ඌ / و
IPA Braille	/ø/
Russian Braille	Ю
Slovak Braille	Ť
Arabic Braille	ؤ
Thai Braille	ต t
Luxembourgish Braille	8 (eight)
Romanian Braille	ț

== Other braille ==
Japanese Braille	shi / し / シ
Korean Braille	yeol / 열
Mainland Chinese Braille	you, -iu
Taiwanese Braille	yu, -ü / ㄩ
Two-Cell Chinese Braille	xu- -áo
Nemeth Braille	(pipe)
Gardner Salinas Braille	8
Algerian Braille	ـٌ (tanwīn)

== Plus dots 7 and 8 ==
Related to Braille pattern dots-1256 are Braille patterns 12567, 12568, and 125678, which are used in 8-dot braille systems, such as Gardner-Salinas and Luxembourgish Braille.

Character information
Preview	⡳ (braille pattern dots-12567)		⢳ (braille pattern dots-12568)		⣳ (braille pattern dots-125678)	
Unicode name	BRAILLE PATTERN DOTS-12567		BRAILLE PATTERN DOTS-12568		BRAILLE PATTERN DOTS-125678	
Encodings	decimal	hex	dec	hex	dec	hex
Unicode	10355	U+2873	10419	U+28B3	10483	U+28F3
UTF-8	226 161 179	E2 A1 B3	226 162 179	E2 A2 B3	226 163 179	E2 A3 B3
Numeric character reference	&#10355;	&#x2873;	&#10419;	&#x28B3;	&#10483;	&#x28F3;

	dots 12567	dots 12568	dots 125678
Gardner Salinas Braille		absolute value	

== Related 8-dot kantenji patterns ==
In the Japanese kantenji braille, the standard 8-dot Braille patterns 2368, 12368, 23468, and 123468 are the patterns related to Braille pattern dots-1256, since the two additional dots of kantenji patterns 01256, 12567, and 012567 are placed above the base 6-dot cell, instead of below, as in standard 8-dot braille.

Character information
Preview	⢦ (braille pattern dots-2368)		⢧ (braille pattern dots-12368)		⢮ (braille pattern dots-23468)		⢯ (braille pattern dots-123468)	
Unicode name	BRAILLE PATTERN DOTS-2368		BRAILLE PATTERN DOTS-12368		BRAILLE PATTERN DOTS-23468		BRAILLE PATTERN DOTS-123468	
Encodings	decimal	hex	dec	hex	dec	hex	dec	hex
Unicode	10406	U+28A6	10407	U+28A7	10414	U+28AE	10415	U+28AF
UTF-8	226 162 166	E2 A2 A6	226 162 167	E2 A2 A7	226 162 174	E2 A2 AE	226 162 175	E2 A2 AF
Numeric character reference	&#10406;	&#x28A6;	&#10407;	&#x28A7;	&#10414;	&#x28AE;	&#10415;	&#x28AF;

=== Kantenji using braille patterns 2368, 12368, 23468, or 123468 ===
This listing includes kantenji using Braille pattern dots-1256 for all 6349 kanji found in JIS C 6226-1978.

- - 巿

==== Variants and thematic compounds ====
- - selector 5 + し/巿 = 申
- - selector 6 + し/巿 = 曳
  - - selector 6 + selector 6 + し/巿 = 曵
- - し/巿 + selector 1 = 色
- - し/巿 + selector 3 = 巾
  - - し/巿 + selector 3 + selector 3 = 黹
- - 数 + し/巿 = 寸
- - し/巿 + く/艹 = 黒
- - し/巿 + か/金 = 赤
- - し/巿 + こ/子 = 黄
- - し/巿 + せ/食 = 青
- - し/巿 + み/耳 = 緑
- - し/巿 + む/車 = 紫

==== Compounds of 巿 ====
- - ふ/女 + し/巿 = 姉
- - ほ/方 + し/巿 = 旆
- - 心 + し/巿 = 柿
- - ⺼ + し/巿 = 肺
- - し/巿 + ら/月 = 師
  - - ち/竹 + し/巿 + ら/月 = 篩
  - - せ/食 + し/巿 + ら/月 = 鰤
- - に/氵 + 宿 + し/巿 = 沛
  - - ち/竹 + 宿 + し/巿 = 霈
- - も/門 + 龸 + し/巿 = 閙
  - - も/門 + う/宀/#3 + し/巿 = 鬧

==== Compounds of 申 ====
- - し/巿 + 数 = 暢
- - 仁/亻 + し/巿 = 伸
- - ね/示 + し/巿 = 神
  - - 心 + ね/示 + し/巿 = 榊
  - - せ/食 + ね/示 + し/巿 = 鰰
- - い/糹/#2 + し/巿 = 紳
- - し/巿 + れ/口 = 呻
- - つ/土 + selector 5 + し/巿 = 坤
- - て/扌 + selector 5 + し/巿 = 抻

==== Compounds of 曳 ====
- - に/氵 + し/巿 = 洩
- - い/糹/#2 + selector 6 + し/巿 = 絏

==== Compounds of 色 ====
- - ゐ/幺 + し/巿 = 絶
- - た/⽥ + し/巿 = 艶
  - - た/⽥ + た/⽥ + し/巿 = 艷

==== Compounds of 巾 ====
- - む/車 + し/巿 = 凧
  - - な/亻 + む/車 + し/巿 = 佩
  - - へ/⺩ + む/車 + し/巿 = 珮
- - ろ/十 + し/巿 = 布
  - - る/忄 + し/巿 = 怖
  - - め/目 + し/巿 = 希
    - - れ/口 + め/目 + し/巿 = 唏
    - - 日 + め/目 + し/巿 = 晞
    - - ん/止 + め/目 + し/巿 = 欷
    - - の/禾 + め/目 + し/巿 = 稀
    - - せ/食 + め/目 + し/巿 = 鯑
- - ま/石 + し/巿 = 帝
  - - 囗 + ま/石 + し/巿 = 啻
  - - れ/口 + ま/石 + し/巿 = 啼
  - - 心 + ま/石 + し/巿 = 楴
  - - く/艹 + ま/石 + し/巿 = 蒂
- - し/巿 + 囗 = 吊
  - - 龸 + し/巿 = 常
    - - ふ/女 + 龸 + し/巿 = 嫦
    - - む/車 + 龸 + し/巿 = 蟐
- - く/艹 + し/巿 = 幕
  - - 宿 + く/艹 + し/巿 = 冪
  - - す/発 + く/艹 + し/巿 = 羃
- - 氷/氵 + し/巿 = 幣
  - - 氷/氵 + 氷/氵 + し/巿 = 幤
- - し/巿 + ぬ/力 = 刷
- - し/巿 + 龸 = 帆
- - し/巿 + ⺼ = 帥
- - し/巿 + よ/广 = 帯
  - - し/巿 + し/巿 + よ/广 = 帶
    - - く/艹 + し/巿 + よ/广 = 蔕
- - し/巿 + と/戸 = 帳
- - し/巿 + い/糹/#2 = 帷
- - し/巿 + め/目 = 帽
- - し/巿 + ふ/女 = 幅
- - し/巿 + り/分 = 幌
- - し/巿 + ま/石 = 幔
- - し/巿 + 日 = 幟
- - も/門 + 宿 + し/巿 = 匝
- - し/巿 + selector 1 + ん/止 = 帋
- - し/巿 + ふ/女 + ゑ/訁 = 帑
- - し/巿 + 宿 + と/戸 = 帖
- - し/巿 + selector 6 + け/犬 = 帙
- - し/巿 + 日 + selector 1 = 帛
- - し/巿 + を/貝 + と/戸 = 幀
- - し/巿 + 宿 + い/糹/#2 = 幃
- - し/巿 + と/戸 + ゆ/彳 = 幄
- - し/巿 + 龸 + 日 = 幎
- - し/巿 + 囗 + へ/⺩ = 幗
- - し/巿 + の/禾 + た/⽥ = 幡
- - し/巿 + ま/石 + り/分 = 幢
- - し/巿 + ろ/十 + ゑ/訁 = 黻
- - し/巿 + 宿 + ほ/方 = 黼

==== Compounds of 寸 ====
- - な/亻 + し/巿 = 付
  - - れ/口 + な/亻 + し/巿 = 咐
  - - つ/土 + な/亻 + し/巿 = 坿
  - - て/扌 + な/亻 + し/巿 = 拊
  - - き/木 + な/亻 + し/巿 = 柎
  - - く/艹 + な/亻 + し/巿 = 苻
  - - せ/食 + な/亻 + し/巿 = 鮒
  - - よ/广 + し/巿 = 府
    - - き/木 + よ/广 + し/巿 = 椨
    - - ら/月 + し/巿 = 腑
  - - さ/阝 + し/巿 = 附
- - 宿 + し/巿 = 冠
  - - く/艹 + 宿 + し/巿 = 蒄
- - 囗 + し/巿 = 噂
- - う/宀/#3 + し/巿 = 守
  - - け/犬 + し/巿 = 狩
- - つ/土 + し/巿 = 寺
  - - や/疒 + つ/土 + し/巿 = 峙
  - - る/忄 + つ/土 + し/巿 = 恃
  - - た/⽥ + つ/土 + し/巿 = 畤
  - - ゆ/彳 + し/巿 = 待
  - - て/扌 + し/巿 = 持
  - - 日 + し/巿 = 時
    - - つ/土 + 日 + し/巿 = 塒
    - - く/艹 + 日 + し/巿 = 蒔
  - - そ/馬 + し/巿 = 特
  - - や/疒 + し/巿 = 痔
  - - ち/竹 + し/巿 = 等
  - - ゑ/訁 + し/巿 = 詩
  - - し/巿 + な/亻 = 侍
- - へ/⺩ + し/巿 = 寿
  - - へ/⺩ + へ/⺩ + し/巿 = 壽
    - - な/亻 + へ/⺩ + し/巿 = 儔
    - - て/扌 + へ/⺩ + し/巿 = 擣
    - - 氷/氵 + へ/⺩ + し/巿 = 濤
    - - た/⽥ + へ/⺩ + し/巿 = 疇
    - - ち/竹 + へ/⺩ + し/巿 = 籌
    - - み/耳 + へ/⺩ + し/巿 = 躊
  - - き/木 + へ/⺩ + し/巿 = 梼
  - - に/氵 + へ/⺩ + し/巿 = 涛
  - - さ/阝 + へ/⺩ + し/巿 = 陦
  - - か/金 + し/巿 = 鋳
    - - か/金 + か/金 + し/巿 = 鑄
- - み/耳 + し/巿 = 射
  - - そ/馬 + み/耳 + し/巿 = 麝
- - せ/食 + し/巿 = 尊
  - - つ/土 + せ/食 + し/巿 = 墫
  - - み/耳 + せ/食 + し/巿 = 蹲
  - - せ/食 + せ/食 + し/巿 = 鱒
- - れ/口 + し/巿 = 尋
  - - に/氵 + れ/口 + し/巿 = 潯
  - - 心 + れ/口 + し/巿 = 蕁
- - ひ/辶 + し/巿 = 導
- - き/木 + し/巿 = 村
- - す/発 + し/巿 = 欝
  - - す/発 + す/発 + し/巿 = 鬱
- - の/禾 + し/巿 = 耐
- - え/訁 + し/巿 = 討
  - - す/発 + え/訁 + し/巿 = 罸
- - も/門 + し/巿 = 闘
  - - も/門 + も/門 + し/巿 = 鬪
- - し/巿 + ろ/十 = 辱
  - - に/氵 + し/巿 + ろ/十 = 溽
  - - い/糹/#2 + し/巿 + ろ/十 = 縟
  - - こ/子 + し/巿 + ろ/十 = 耨
  - - く/艹 + し/巿 + ろ/十 = 蓐
  - - ね/示 + し/巿 + ろ/十 = 褥
- - れ/口 + 比 + し/巿 = 吋
- - ろ/十 + 比 + し/巿 = 尅
- - し/巿 + つ/土 + つ/土 = 幇
- - る/忄 + 比 + し/巿 = 忖
- - い/糹/#2 + 比 + し/巿 = 紂
- - せ/食 + 比 + し/巿 = 酎

==== Compounds of 黒 ====
- - し/巿 + つ/土 = 墨
- - し/巿 + け/犬 = 黙
  - - し/巿 + し/巿 + け/犬 = 默
- - よ/广 + し/巿 + く/艹 = 廛
- - ゆ/彳 + し/巿 + く/艹 = 黴
- - ⺼ + し/巿 + く/艹 = 黶
- - し/巿 + り/分 + selector 1 = 黔
- - し/巿 + 仁/亻 + 囗 = 黛
- - し/巿 + 比 + へ/⺩ = 黜
- - し/巿 + ゐ/幺 + selector 1 = 黝
- - し/巿 + つ/土 + れ/口 = 黠
- - し/巿 + 龸 + れ/口 = 黥
- - し/巿 + ま/石 + 日 = 黯
- - し/巿 + つ/土 + を/貝 = 黷

==== Compounds of 赤 ====
- - お/頁 + し/巿 + か/金 = 赧

==== Compounds of 黄 ====
- - ち/竹 + し/巿 + こ/子 = 簧
- - 龸 + し/巿 + こ/子 = 黌

==== Compounds of 青 ====
- - な/亻 + し/巿 + せ/食 = 倩
- - け/犬 + し/巿 + せ/食 = 猜
- - め/目 + し/巿 + せ/食 = 睛
- - 心 + し/巿 + せ/食 = 菁
- - む/車 + し/巿 + せ/食 = 蜻
- - せ/食 + し/巿 + せ/食 = 鯖

==== Other compounds ====
- - と/戸 + し/巿 = 屍
