= Braille pattern dots-12356 =

Braille pattern

6-dot braille cells
⠀	⠁	⠃	⠉	⠙	⠑	⠋	⠛	⠓	⠊	⠚	⠈	⠘
⠄	⠅	⠇	⠍	⠝	⠕	⠏	⠟	⠗	⠎	⠞	⠌	⠜
⠤	⠥	⠧	⠭	⠽	⠵	⠯	⠿	⠷	⠮	⠾	⠬	⠼
⠠	⠡	⠣	⠩	⠹	⠱	⠫	⠻	⠳	⠪	⠺	⠨	⠸
shift down	⠂	⠆	⠒	⠲	⠢	⠖	⠶	⠦	⠔	⠴	⠐	⠰

The Braille pattern dots-12356 ( ⠷ ) is a 6-dot braille cell with the top left, both middle, and both bottom dots raised, or an 8-dot braille cell with the top left, both upper-middle, and both lower-middle dots raised. It is represented by the Unicode code point U+2837, and in Braille ASCII with the open parenthesis: (.

Character information
Preview	⠷ (braille pattern dots-12356)	
Unicode name	BRAILLE PATTERN DOTS-12356	
Encodings	decimal	hex
Unicode	10295	U+2837
UTF-8	226 160 183	E2 A0 B7
Numeric character reference	&#10295;	&#x2837;
Braille ASCII	40	28

== Unified Braille ==
In unified international braille, the braille pattern dots-12356 is used to represent a voiced pharyngeal fricative, i.e. /ʕ/, or otherwise as needed.

=== Table of unified braille values ===
French Braille	À, ch
English Braille	of
German Braille	em
Bharati Braille	ഴ / ழ / ඇ / ع
IPA Braille	/ʊ/
Slovak Braille	Ŕ
Arabic Braille	ع
Persian Braille	ع
Irish Braille	Í
Thai Braille	เีย ia

== Other braille ==
Japanese Braille	mi / み / ミ
Korean Braille	on / 온
Mainland Chinese Braille	ou
Taiwanese Braille	ou / ㄡ
Two-Cell Chinese Braille	lü- -ǎo
Nemeth Braille	( (open parenthesis)
Gardner Salinas Braille	begin fraction
Algerian Braille	ي

== Plus dots 7 and 8 ==
Related to Braille pattern dots-12356 are Braille patterns 123567, 123568, and 1235678, which are used in 8-dot braille systems, such as Gardner-Salinas and Luxembourgish Braille.

Character information
Preview	⡷ (braille pattern dots-123567)		⢷ (braille pattern dots-123568)		⣷ (braille pattern dots-1235678)	
Unicode name	BRAILLE PATTERN DOTS-123567		BRAILLE PATTERN DOTS-123568		BRAILLE PATTERN DOTS-1235678	
Encodings	decimal	hex	dec	hex	dec	hex
Unicode	10359	U+2877	10423	U+28B7	10487	U+28F7
UTF-8	226 161 183	E2 A1 B7	226 162 183	E2 A2 B7	226 163 183	E2 A3 B7
Numeric character reference	&#10359;	&#x2877;	&#10423;	&#x28B7;	&#10487;	&#x28F7;

	dots 123567	dots 123568	dots 1235678
Gardner Salinas Braille		• (bullet)	{ (open brace)

== Related 8-dot kantenji patterns ==
In the Japanese kantenji braille, the standard 8-dot Braille patterns 23678, 123678, 234678, and 1234678 are the patterns related to Braille pattern dots-12356, since the two additional dots of kantenji patterns 012356, 123567, and 0123567 are placed above the base 6-dot cell, instead of below, as in standard 8-dot braille.

Character information
Preview	⣦ (braille pattern dots-23678)		⣧ (braille pattern dots-123678)		⣮ (braille pattern dots-234678)		⣯ (braille pattern dots-1234678)	
Unicode name	BRAILLE PATTERN DOTS-23678		BRAILLE PATTERN DOTS-123678		BRAILLE PATTERN DOTS-234678		BRAILLE PATTERN DOTS-1234678	
Encodings	decimal	hex	dec	hex	dec	hex	dec	hex
Unicode	10470	U+28E6	10471	U+28E7	10478	U+28EE	10479	U+28EF
UTF-8	226 163 166	E2 A3 A6	226 163 167	E2 A3 A7	226 163 174	E2 A3 AE	226 163 175	E2 A3 AF
Numeric character reference	&#10470;	&#x28E6;	&#10471;	&#x28E7;	&#10478;	&#x28EE;	&#10479;	&#x28EF;

=== Kantenji using braille patterns 23678, 123678, 234678, or 1234678 ===
This listing includes kantenji using Braille pattern dots-12356 for all 6349 kanji found in JIS C 6226-1978.

- - 耳

==== Variants and thematic compounds ====
- - selector 3 + み/耳 = 襄
- - selector 4 + み/耳 = 哉
- - selector 5 + み/耳 = 禹
- - selector 6 + み/耳 = 呂
- - み/耳 + selector 1 = 身
- - み/耳 + selector 2 = 足
- - 比 + み/耳 = 南
- - し/巿 + み/耳 = 緑

==== Compounds of 耳 ====
- - み/耳 + み/耳 + み/耳 = 聶
  - - 囗 + み/耳 = 囁
  - - て/扌 + み/耳 = 摂
    - - て/扌 + て/扌 + み/耳 = 攝
  - - る/忄 + み/耳 + み/耳 = 懾
  - - か/金 + 宿 + み/耳 = 鑷
  - - お/頁 + 宿 + み/耳 = 顳
- - も/門 + み/耳 = 聞
- - ゆ/彳 + み/耳 = 聳
- - 心 + み/耳 = 茸
- - く/艹 + み/耳 = 葺
- - む/車 + み/耳 = 輯
- - み/耳 + ゑ/訁 = 取
  - - み/耳 + て/扌 = 撮
  - - ふ/女 + み/耳 + ゑ/訁 = 娶
  - - て/扌 + み/耳 + ゑ/訁 = 掫
  - - え/訁 + み/耳 + ゑ/訁 = 諏
  - - む/車 + み/耳 + ゑ/訁 = 輙
  - - さ/阝 + み/耳 + ゑ/訁 = 陬
  - - そ/馬 + み/耳 + ゑ/訁 = 驟
- - み/耳 + 心 = 恥
- - み/耳 + 氷/氵 = 敢
  - - 心 + み/耳 + 氷/氵 = 橄
  - - め/目 + み/耳 + 氷/氵 = 瞰
- - み/耳 + さ/阝 = 耶
  - - て/扌 + み/耳 + さ/阝 = 揶
  - - 心 + み/耳 + さ/阝 = 椰
- - み/耳 + 龸 = 耽
- - み/耳 + 火 = 耿
- - み/耳 + へ/⺩ = 聖
  - - む/車 + み/耳 + へ/⺩ = 蟶
- - み/耳 + こ/子 = 聡
  - - み/耳 + み/耳 + こ/子 = 聰
- - み/耳 + ろ/十 = 聴
  - - み/耳 + み/耳 + ろ/十 = 聽
- - み/耳 + 日 = 職
- - み/耳 + ほ/方 = 聾
- - ゆ/彳 + 宿 + み/耳 = 弭
- - き/木 + れ/口 + み/耳 = 楫
- - へ/⺩ + 宿 + み/耳 = 珥
- - い/糹/#2 + 宿 + み/耳 = 緝
- - み/耳 + 宿 + ん/止 = 耻
- - み/耳 + 仁/亻 + ろ/十 = 聆
- - み/耳 + 宿 + さ/阝 = 聊
- - み/耳 + れ/口 + せ/食 = 聒
- - み/耳 + 宿 + た/⽥ = 聘
- - み/耳 + や/疒 + れ/口 = 聟
- - み/耳 + う/宀/#3 + よ/广 = 聢
- - み/耳 + 龸 + ゐ/幺 = 聨
- - み/耳 + 宿 + ゐ/幺 = 聯
- - み/耳 + 宿 + て/扌 = 聹
- - む/車 + 宿 + み/耳 = 輒
- - み/耳 + 龸 + せ/食 = 鵈

==== Compounds of 襄 ====
- - つ/土 + み/耳 = 壌
  - - つ/土 + つ/土 + み/耳 = 壤
- - ふ/女 + み/耳 = 嬢
  - - ふ/女 + ふ/女 + み/耳 = 孃
- - の/禾 + み/耳 = 穣
  - - の/禾 + の/禾 + み/耳 = 穰
- - ゑ/訁 + み/耳 = 譲
  - - ゑ/訁 + ゑ/訁 + み/耳 = 讓
- - せ/食 + み/耳 = 醸
  - - せ/食 + せ/食 + み/耳 = 釀
- - 日 + 宿 + み/耳 = 曩
- - て/扌 + 宿 + み/耳 = 攘
- - ね/示 + 宿 + み/耳 = 禳
- - そ/馬 + 宿 + み/耳 = 驤

==== Compounds of 哉 ====
- - い/糹/#2 + み/耳 = 繊
  - - い/糹/#2 + い/糹/#2 + み/耳 = 纖
- - る/忄 + み/耳 = 懺
  - - selector 1 + る/忄 + み/耳 = 懴
- - ほ/方 + み/耳 = 殱
  - - ほ/方 + ほ/方 + み/耳 = 殲
- - を/貝 + み/耳 = 賊
- - み/耳 + い/糹/#2 = 截
- - み/耳 + た/⽥ = 戴
- - み/耳 + き/木 = 栽
- - み/耳 + ね/示 = 裁
- - み/耳 + む/車 = 載
- - ふ/女 + 宿 + み/耳 = 孅
- - ち/竹 + 龸 + み/耳 = 籖
- - ち/竹 + 宿 + み/耳 = 籤
- - い/糹/#2 + 龸 + み/耳 = 纎
- - え/訁 + 宿 + み/耳 = 讖

==== Compounds of 禹 ====
- - れ/口 + み/耳 = 嘱
  - - れ/口 + れ/口 + み/耳 = 囑
- - と/戸 + み/耳 = 属
  - - と/戸 + と/戸 + み/耳 = 屬
    - - め/目 + と/戸 + み/耳 = 矚
- - み/耳 + ん/止 + の/禾 = 齲

==== Compounds of 呂 ====
- - 仁/亻 + み/耳 = 侶
- - 龸 + み/耳 = 営
  - - 龸 + 龸 + み/耳 = 營
- - う/宀/#3 + み/耳 = 宮
- - ま/石 + み/耳 = 麿
- - き/木 + selector 6 + み/耳 = 梠
- - も/門 + selector 6 + み/耳 = 閭
  - - 心 + selector 6 + み/耳 = 櫚
- - ち/竹 + selector 6 + み/耳 = 筥
- - い/糹/#2 + selector 6 + み/耳 = 絽

==== Compounds of 身 ====
- - 宿 + み/耳 = 窮
- - み/耳 + し/巿 = 射
  - - え/訁 + み/耳 = 謝
  - - そ/馬 + み/耳 + し/巿 = 麝
- - み/耳 + そ/馬 = 躾
- - み/耳 + selector 1 + ゐ/幺 = 躱
- - み/耳 + ゆ/彳 + selector 1 = 躬
- - み/耳 + も/門 + selector 3 = 躯
- - み/耳 + き/木 + selector 6 = 躰
- - み/耳 + 龸 + よ/广 = 軅
- - み/耳 + た/⽥ + と/戸 = 軆
- - み/耳 + よ/广 + 心 = 軈

==== Compounds of 足 ====
- - な/亻 + み/耳 = 促
- - み/耳 + れ/口 = 路
  - - ち/竹 + み/耳 = 露
  - - み/耳 + せ/食 = 鷺
  - - 心 + み/耳 + れ/口 = 蕗
- - み/耳 + ひ/辶 = 跛
- - み/耳 + す/発 = 距
- - み/耳 + え/訁 = 跡
- - み/耳 + 宿 = 跳
- - み/耳 + 囗 = 践
  - - み/耳 + み/耳 + 囗 = 踐
- - み/耳 + つ/土 = 踊
- - み/耳 + に/氵 = 踏
- - み/耳 + ま/石 = 蹄
- - み/耳 + ゐ/幺 = 蹊
- - み/耳 + 仁/亻 = 蹴
- - み/耳 + う/宀/#3 = 躁
- - み/耳 + や/疒 = 躍
- - み/耳 + を/貝 = 躓
- - ひ/辶 + み/耳 = 蹙
- - て/扌 + み/耳 + selector 2 = 捉
- - う/宀/#3 + み/耳 + selector 2 = 蹇
- - ん/止 + み/耳 + selector 2 = 齪
- - み/耳 + selector 3 + け/犬 = 趺
- - み/耳 + 龸 + ん/止 = 趾
- - み/耳 + は/辶 + selector 2 = 跂
- - み/耳 + ろ/十 + ゑ/訁 = 跋
- - み/耳 + selector 6 + け/犬 = 跌
- - み/耳 + ぬ/力 + れ/口 = 跏
- - み/耳 + 宿 + ま/石 = 跖
- - み/耳 + 宿 + へ/⺩ = 跚
- - み/耳 + selector 3 + や/疒 = 跟
- - み/耳 + つ/土 + 龸 = 跣
- - み/耳 + 宿 + け/犬 = 跨
- - み/耳 + く/艹 + さ/阝 = 跪
- - み/耳 + 宿 + 龸 = 跫
- - み/耳 + と/戸 + も/門 = 跼
- - み/耳 + 宿 + は/辶 = 跿
- - み/耳 + き/木 + 数 = 踈
- - み/耳 + 比 + や/疒 = 踉
- - み/耳 + た/⽥ + き/木 = 踝
- - み/耳 + と/戸 + selector 1 = 踞
- - み/耳 + 宿 + や/疒 = 踟
- - み/耳 + う/宀/#3 + ね/示 = 踪
- - み/耳 + 宿 + ゆ/彳 = 踰
- - み/耳 + ぬ/力 + た/⽥ = 踴
- - み/耳 + 龸 + り/分 = 踵
- - み/耳 + き/木 + よ/广 = 蹂
- - み/耳 + 宿 + ぬ/力 = 蹈
- - み/耳 + そ/馬 + こ/子 = 蹉
- - み/耳 + り/分 + お/頁 = 蹌
- - み/耳 + ⺼ + 仁/亻 = 蹐
- - み/耳 + た/⽥ + か/金 = 蹕
- - み/耳 + へ/⺩ + を/貝 = 蹟
- - み/耳 + よ/广 + と/戸 = 蹠
- - み/耳 + 宿 + め/目 = 蹣
- - み/耳 + ゆ/彳 + よ/广 = 蹤
- - み/耳 + せ/食 + し/巿 = 蹲
- - み/耳 + ん/止 + selector 1 = 蹶
- - み/耳 + 宿 + な/亻 = 蹼
- - み/耳 + selector 6 + ま/石 = 躄
- - み/耳 + selector 4 + む/車 = 躅
- - み/耳 + と/戸 + く/艹 = 躇
- - み/耳 + へ/⺩ + し/巿 = 躊
- - み/耳 + さ/阝 + 龸 = 躋
- - み/耳 + 宿 + せ/食 = 躑
- - み/耳 + 宿 + よ/广 = 躔
- - み/耳 + 宿 + も/門 = 躙
- - み/耳 + 宿 + み/耳 = 躡
- - み/耳 + 龸 + も/門 = 躪

==== Compounds of 南 ====
- - み/耳 + け/犬 = 献
  - - み/耳 + み/耳 + け/犬 = 獻
- - れ/口 + 比 + み/耳 = 喃
- - 心 + 比 + み/耳 = 楠
- - ひ/辶 + 比 + み/耳 = 遖

==== Compounds of 緑 ====
- - ね/示 + み/耳 = 禄
  - - ね/示 + ね/示 + み/耳 = 祿
- - か/金 + み/耳 = 録
- - み/耳 + ぬ/力 = 剥

==== Other compounds ====
- - み/耳 + の/禾 = 声
  - - み/耳 + み/耳 + の/禾 = 聲
  - - ま/石 + み/耳 + の/禾 = 磬
  - - え/訁 + み/耳 + の/禾 = 謦
  - - み/耳 + の/禾 + 日 = 馨
- - み/耳 + ん/止 = 民
  - - や/疒 + み/耳 + ん/止 = 岷
  - - る/忄 + み/耳 + ん/止 = 愍
  - - ほ/方 + み/耳 + ん/止 = 氓
  - - に/氵 + み/耳 + ん/止 = 泯
  - - い/糹/#2 + み/耳 + ん/止 = 緡
- - き/木 + み/耳 = 枕
- - 氷/氵 + み/耳 = 派
- - ⺼ + み/耳 = 脈
- - み/耳 + 宿 + の/禾 = 殷
  - - み/耳 + 宿 + 心 = 慇
- - と/戸 + み/耳 + に/氵 = 鞜
- - ま/石 + 宿 + み/耳 = 碌
