= Braille pattern dots-23456 =

Braille pattern

6-dot braille cells
⠀	⠁	⠃	⠉	⠙	⠑	⠋	⠛	⠓	⠊	⠚	⠈	⠘
⠄	⠅	⠇	⠍	⠝	⠕	⠏	⠟	⠗	⠎	⠞	⠌	⠜
⠤	⠥	⠧	⠭	⠽	⠵	⠯	⠿	⠷	⠮	⠾	⠬	⠼
⠠	⠡	⠣	⠩	⠹	⠱	⠫	⠻	⠳	⠪	⠺	⠨	⠸
shift down	⠂	⠆	⠒	⠲	⠢	⠖	⠶	⠦	⠔	⠴	⠐	⠰

The Braille pattern dots-23456 ( ⠾ ) is a 6-dot braille cell with the top right, both middle, and both bottom dots raised, or an 8-dot braille cell with the top right, both upper-middle, and both lower-middle dots raised. It is represented by the Unicode code point U+283e, and in Braille ASCII with a close parenthesis: ).

Character information
Preview	⠾ (braille pattern dots-23456)	
Unicode name	BRAILLE PATTERN DOTS-23456	
Encodings	decimal	hex
Unicode	10302	U+283E
UTF-8	226 160 190	E2 A0 BE
Numeric character reference	&#10302;	&#x283E;
Braille ASCII	41	29

== Unified Braille ==
In unified international braille, the braille pattern dots-23456 is used to represent an unvoiced dental or alveolar plosive, such as /t/ or /t̪/ when multiple letters correspond to these values, and is otherwise assigned as needed.

=== Table of unified braille values ===
French Braille	Ù, oi, "et"
English Braille	with
German Braille	st
Bharati Braille	ट / ਟ / ટ / ট / ଟ / ట / ಟ / ട / ட / ට / ٹ
IPA Braille	breve
Russian Braille	Ь
Slovak Braille	Ô
Arabic Braille	ط
Persian Braille	ط
Irish Braille	Ú
Thai Braille	ท th

== Other braille ==
Japanese Braille	mo / も / モ
Korean Braille	an / 안
Mainland Chinese Braille	yue, -üe
Taiwanese Braille	ya, -ia / ㄧㄚ
Two-Cell Chinese Braille	null consonant, -ǎ
Nemeth Braille	) (close parenthesis)
Gardner Salinas Braille	end fraction
Algerian Braille	ء

== Plus dots 7 and 8 ==
Related to Braille pattern dots-23456 are Braille patterns 234567, 234568, and 2345678, which are used in 8-dot braille systems, such as Gardner-Salinas and Luxembourgish Braille.

Character information
Preview	⡾ (braille pattern dots-234567)		⢾ (braille pattern dots-234568)		⣾ (braille pattern dots-2345678)	
Unicode name	BRAILLE PATTERN DOTS-234567		BRAILLE PATTERN DOTS-234568		BRAILLE PATTERN DOTS-2345678	
Encodings	decimal	hex	dec	hex	dec	hex
Unicode	10366	U+287E	10430	U+28BE	10494	U+28FE
UTF-8	226 161 190	E2 A1 BE	226 162 190	E2 A2 BE	226 163 190	E2 A3 BE
Numeric character reference	&#10366;	&#x287E;	&#10430;	&#x28BE;	&#10494;	&#x28FE;

	dots 234567	dots 234568	dots 2345678
Gardner Salinas Braille	⇌ (equilibrium)		} (close brace)

== Related 8-dot kantenji patterns ==
In the Japanese kantenji braille, the standard 8-dot Braille patterns 35678, 135678, 345678, and 1345678 are the patterns related to Braille pattern dots-23456, since the two additional dots of kantenji patterns 023456, 234567, and 0234567 are placed above the base 6-dot cell, instead of below, as in standard 8-dot braille.

Character information
Preview	⣴ (braille pattern dots-35678)		⣵ (braille pattern dots-135678)		⣼ (braille pattern dots-345678)		⣽ (braille pattern dots-1345678)	
Unicode name	BRAILLE PATTERN DOTS-35678		BRAILLE PATTERN DOTS-135678		BRAILLE PATTERN DOTS-345678		BRAILLE PATTERN DOTS-1345678	
Encodings	decimal	hex	dec	hex	dec	hex	dec	hex
Unicode	10484	U+28F4	10485	U+28F5	10492	U+28FC	10493	U+28FD
UTF-8	226 163 180	E2 A3 B4	226 163 181	E2 A3 B5	226 163 188	E2 A3 BC	226 163 189	E2 A3 BD
Numeric character reference	&#10484;	&#x28F4;	&#10485;	&#x28F5;	&#10492;	&#x28FC;	&#10493;	&#x28FD;

=== Kantenji using braille patterns 35678, 135678, 345678, or 1345678 ===
This listing includes kantenji using Braille pattern dots-23456 for all 6349 kanji found in JIS C 6226-1978.

- - 門

==== Variants and thematic compounds ====
- - selector 4 + も/門 = 以
- - selector 5 + も/門 = 鬥
- - selector 6 + も/門 = 芻
- - も/門 + selector 1 = 気
  - - も/門 + selector 1 + selector 1 = 气
- - も/門 + selector 2 = 包
  - - も/門 + selector 2 + selector 2 = 勹
- - も/門 + selector 3 = 区
  - - も/門 + selector 3 + selector 3 = 匚
- - も/門 + selector 5 = 句
- - も/門 + selector 6 = 凶
  - - も/門 + selector 6 + selector 6 = 凵
- - 比 + も/門 = 勺

==== Compounds of 門 ====
- - る/忄 + も/門 = 憫
- - 心 + も/門 = 蘭
- - も/門 + れ/口 = 問
  - - も/門 + れ/口 + れ/口 = 闡
- - も/門 + 心 = 悶
- - も/門 + 宿 + ひ/辶 = 闌
  - - も/門 + ひ/辶 = 欄
  - - に/氵 + も/門 + ひ/辶 = 瀾
  - - 火 + も/門 + ひ/辶 = 爛
  - - ね/示 + も/門 + ひ/辶 = 襴
- - も/門 + み/耳 = 聞
- - も/門 + な/亻 = 閃
- - も/門 + ろ/十 = 閉
- - も/門 + と/戸 = 開
- - も/門 + へ/⺩ = 閏
- - も/門 + き/木 = 閑
  - - ふ/女 + も/門 + き/木 = 嫻
- - も/門 + 日 = 間
  - - つ/土 + も/門 + 日 = 墹
- - も/門 + け/犬 = 関
  - - も/門 + も/門 + け/犬 = 關
- - も/門 + す/発 = 閣
  - - て/扌 + も/門 + す/発 = 擱
- - も/門 + 囗 = 閥
- - も/門 + こ/子 = 閧
- - も/門 + つ/土 = 閨
- - も/門 + 宿 = 閲
- - も/門 + ま/石 = 闇
- - も/門 + し/巿 = 闘
- - ふ/女 + も/門 + ら/月 = 嫺
- - 火 + も/門 + 日 = 燗
- - や/疒 + も/門 + ら/月 = 癇
- - い/糹/#2 + も/門 + ら/月 = 繝
- - な/亻 + 宿 + も/門 = 們
- - て/扌 + 宿 + も/門 = 捫
- - 心 + 龸 + も/門 = 椚
- - も/門 + に/氵 + せ/食 = 濶
- - み/耳 + 宿 + も/門 = 躙
- - み/耳 + 龸 + も/門 = 躪
- - も/門 + 宿 + 宿 = 閂
- - も/門 + 比 + 龸 = 閇
- - も/門 + や/疒 + selector 1 = 閊
- - も/門 + 龸 + selector 3 = 閔
- - も/門 + 宿 + に/氵 = 閖
- - も/門 + 宿 + こ/子 = 閘
- - も/門 + 龸 + し/巿 = 閙
- - も/門 + う/宀/#3 + へ/⺩ = 閠
- - も/門 + り/分 + 囗 = 閤
- - も/門 + selector 6 + み/耳 = 閭
- - も/門 + selector 6 + 心 = 閹
- - も/門 + 宿 + ぬ/力 = 閻
- - も/門 + ほ/方 + 龸 = 閼
- - も/門 + 囗 + selector 4 = 閾
- - も/門 + め/目 + け/犬 = 闃
- - も/門 + れ/口 + せ/食 = 闊
- - も/門 + と/戸 + 日 = 闍
- - も/門 + つ/土 + こ/子 = 闔
- - も/門 + ん/止 + selector 1 = 闕
- - も/門 + 宿 + そ/馬 = 闖
- - も/門 + 宿 + ま/石 = 闢
- - も/門 + ひ/辶 + た/⽥ = 闥

==== Compounds of 以 ====
- - な/亻 + も/門 = 似
- - 心 + selector 4 + も/門 = 苡

==== Compounds of 鬥 ====
- - も/門 + も/門 + こ/子 = 鬨
- - も/門 + も/門 + し/巿 = 鬪
- - も/門 + う/宀/#3 + し/巿 = 鬧
- - も/門 + こ/子 + 宿 = 鬩
- - も/門 + 比 + め/目 = 鬮

==== Compounds of 芻 ====
- - も/門 + い/糹/#2 = 雛
- - く/艹 + selector 6 + も/門 = 蒭
- - も/門 + selector 4 + ひ/辶 = 皺
- - さ/阝 + 宿 + も/門 = 鄒

==== Compounds of 気 and 气 ====
- - に/氵 + も/門 = 汽
- - も/門 + も/門 + selector 1 = 氣
  - - る/忄 + も/門 + selector 1 = 愾
- - り/分 + も/門 + selector 1 = 氛
- - も/門 + 囗 + け/犬 = 氤

==== Compounds of 包 and 勹 ====
- - て/扌 + も/門 = 抱
- - ま/石 + も/門 = 砲
- - ら/月 + も/門 = 胞
- - ち/竹 + も/門 = 雹
- - せ/食 + も/門 = 飽
- - も/門 + ふ/女 = 匐
- - ⺼ + も/門 = 胸
- - も/門 + む/車 = 勾
- - も/門 + に/氵 = 匂
- - も/門 + ほ/方 = 匍
- - け/犬 + も/門 + selector 2 = 匏
- - れ/口 + も/門 + selector 2 = 咆
- - つ/土 + も/門 + selector 2 = 垉
- - よ/广 + も/門 + selector 2 = 庖
- - き/木 + も/門 + selector 2 = 枹
- - 火 + も/門 + selector 2 = 炮
- - や/疒 + も/門 + selector 2 = 疱
- - ひ/辶 + も/門 + selector 2 = 皰
- - く/艹 + も/門 + selector 2 = 苞
- - む/車 + も/門 + selector 2 = 蚫
- - ね/示 + も/門 + selector 2 = 袍
- - か/金 + も/門 + selector 2 = 鉋
- - め/目 + も/門 + selector 2 = 靤
- - と/戸 + も/門 + selector 2 = 鞄
- - せ/食 + も/門 + selector 2 = 鮑
- - す/発 + も/門 + selector 2 = 麭
- - る/忄 + 宿 + も/門 = 恟
- - も/門 + 宿 + た/⽥ = 甸
- - も/門 + と/戸 + う/宀/#3 = 髱
- - 心 + う/宀/#3 + も/門 = 蒟
- - も/門 + へ/⺩ + す/発 = 麹

==== Compounds of 区 and 匚 ====
- - そ/馬 + も/門 = 駆
  - - そ/馬 + そ/馬 + も/門 = 驅
- - も/門 + を/貝 = 匠
- - も/門 + 龸 = 匹
- - も/門 + や/疒 = 医
  - - も/門 + も/門 + や/疒 = 醫
- - も/門 + 数 = 匿
  - - る/忄 + も/門 + 数 = 慝
- - も/門 + ん/止 = 欧
  - - も/門 + も/門 + ん/止 = 歐
- - も/門 + の/禾 = 殴
  - - も/門 + も/門 + の/禾 = 毆
- - も/門 + せ/食 = 鴎
- - も/門 + も/門 + selector 3 = 區
  - - え/訁 + も/門 = 謳
  - - れ/口 + も/門 = 嘔
  - - 仁/亻 + も/門 + selector 3 = 傴
  - - け/犬 + も/門 + selector 3 = 奩
  - - ふ/女 + も/門 + selector 3 = 嫗
  - - や/疒 + も/門 + selector 3 = 嶇
- - み/耳 + も/門 + selector 3 = 躯
- - な/亻 + 龸 + も/門 = 偃
- - も/門 + 宿 + し/巿 = 匝
- - も/門 + へ/⺩ + selector 1 = 匡
- - も/門 + 数 + こ/子 = 匣
- - も/門 + selector 4 + 火 = 匪
- - も/門 + 氷/氵 + い/糹/#2 = 匯
- - も/門 + を/貝 + き/木 = 匱
- - も/門 + 宿 + り/分 = 匳
- - も/門 + 宿 + selector 3 = 匸
- - つ/土 + 宿 + も/門 = 堰
- - き/木 + 宿 + も/門 = 框
- - 心 + 宿 + も/門 = 榧
- - も/門 + む/車 + selector 2 = 翳

==== Compounds of 句 ====
- - と/戸 + も/門 = 局
  - - み/耳 + と/戸 + も/門 = 跼
- - け/犬 + も/門 = 狗
- - ん/止 + も/門 = 齣
- - な/亻 + も/門 + selector 5 = 佝
- - ぬ/力 + も/門 + selector 5 = 劬
- - る/忄 + も/門 + selector 5 = 怐
- - 心 + も/門 + selector 5 = 枸
- - 火 + も/門 + selector 5 = 煦
- - く/艹 + も/門 + selector 5 = 苟
  - - も/門 + 氷/氵 = 敬
    - - も/門 + ゑ/訁 = 警
    - - も/門 + そ/馬 = 驚
    - - き/木 + も/門 + 氷/氵 = 檠
- - か/金 + も/門 + selector 5 = 鉤

==== Compounds of 凶 and 凵 ====
- - 宿 + も/門 + selector 6 = 兇
  - - 心 + も/門 + selector 6 = 椶
- - も/門 + も/門 + selector 6 = 匈
  - - に/氵 + も/門 + selector 6 = 洶
  - - も/門 + selector 6 + か/金 = 甌

==== Compounds of 勺 ====
- - 日 + も/門 = 的
- - い/糹/#2 + も/門 = 約
  - - く/艹 + い/糹/#2 + も/門 = 葯
- - か/金 + も/門 = 釣
- - ふ/女 + 比 + も/門 = 妁
- - き/木 + 比 + も/門 = 杓
- - 火 + 比 + も/門 = 灼
- - 心 + 比 + も/門 = 芍
- - せ/食 + 比 + も/門 = 酌
- - つ/土 + も/門 = 均
- - か/金 + 宿 + も/門 = 鈞
- - ま/石 + 宿 + も/門 = 韵

==== Other compounds ====
- - り/分 + も/門 = 余
  - - ゆ/彳 + も/門 = 徐
  - - ひ/辶 + も/門 = 途
  - - さ/阝 + も/門 = 除
  - - た/⽥ + り/分 + も/門 = 畭
  - - 心 + り/分 + も/門 = 荼
  - - む/車 + り/分 + も/門 = 蜍
  - - り/分 + り/分 + も/門 = 餘
- - よ/广 + も/門 = 唐
  - - の/禾 + も/門 = 糖
  - - つ/土 + よ/广 + も/門 = 塘
  - - に/氵 + よ/广 + も/門 = 溏
- - こ/子 + も/門 = 巧
- - き/木 + も/門 = 朽
- - 氷/氵 + も/門 = 汚
- - も/門 + ぬ/力 = 勘
- - も/門 + さ/阝 = 邸
- - ん/止 + 宿 + も/門 = 丐
- - り/分 + 宿 + も/門 = 兮
  - - め/目 + 宿 + も/門 = 盻
- - ふ/女 + 宿 + も/門 = 娉
- - も/門 + 宿 + 氷/氵 = 攷
- - も/門 + 囗 + の/禾 = 粤
- - す/発 + 宿 + も/門 = 虧
- - え/訁 + 宿 + も/門 = 諡
- - も/門 + ほ/方 + そ/馬 = 尠
- - も/門 + 宿 + 囗 = 戡
- - も/門 + 比 + と/戸 = 斟
