= Braille pattern dots-146 =

Braille pattern

6-dot braille cells
⠀	⠁	⠃	⠉	⠙	⠑	⠋	⠛	⠓	⠊	⠚	⠈	⠘
⠄	⠅	⠇	⠍	⠝	⠕	⠏	⠟	⠗	⠎	⠞	⠌	⠜
⠤	⠥	⠧	⠭	⠽	⠵	⠯	⠿	⠷	⠮	⠾	⠬	⠼
⠠	⠡	⠣	⠩	⠹	⠱	⠫	⠻	⠳	⠪	⠺	⠨	⠸
shift down	⠂	⠆	⠒	⠲	⠢	⠖	⠶	⠦	⠔	⠴	⠐	⠰

The Braille pattern dots-146 ( ⠩ ) is a 6-dot braille cell with both top, and the bottom right dots raised, or an 8-dot braille cell with both top, and the lower-middle right dots raised. It is represented by the Unicode code point U+2829, and in Braille ASCII with the percent sign: %.

Character information
Preview	⠩ (braille pattern dots-146)	
Unicode name	BRAILLE PATTERN DOTS-146	
Encodings	decimal	hex
Unicode	10281	U+2829
UTF-8	226 160 169	E2 A0 A9
Numeric character reference	&#10281;	&#x2829;
Braille ASCII	37	25

== Unified braille ==
In unified international braille, the braille pattern dots-146 is used to represent a voiceless palato-alveolar fricative, i.e. /ʃ/ and otherwise as needed.

=== Table of unified braille values ===
French Braille	Î, mathematical 3, cl, -ait, "cet"
English Braille	Sh
English Contraction	shall
German Braille	ei
Bharati Braille	श / ਸ਼ / શ / শ / ଶ / శ / ಶ / ശ / ஶ / ශ / ش
IPA Braille	/æ/
Arabic Braille	ش
Persian Braille	ش
Irish Braille	Sh
Thai Braille	เ◌อ oe
Luxembourgish Braille	3 (three)

== Other braille ==
Japanese Braille	ku / く / ク
Korean Braille	yu / ㅠ
Mainland Chinese Braille	wan, -uan
Taiwanese Braille	ao / ㄠ
Two-Cell Chinese Braille	zhu- -óu
Nemeth Braille	directly under
Gardner Salinas Braille	3

== Plus dots 7 and 8 ==
Related to Braille pattern dots-146 are Braille patterns 1467, 1468, and 14678, which are used in 8-dot braille systems, such as Gardner-Salinas and Luxembourgish Braille.

Character information
Preview	⡩ (braille pattern dots-1467)		⢩ (braille pattern dots-1468)		⣩ (braille pattern dots-14678)	
Unicode name	BRAILLE PATTERN DOTS-1467		BRAILLE PATTERN DOTS-1468		BRAILLE PATTERN DOTS-14678	
Encodings	decimal	hex	dec	hex	dec	hex
Unicode	10345	U+2869	10409	U+28A9	10473	U+28E9
UTF-8	226 161 169	E2 A1 A9	226 162 169	E2 A2 A9	226 163 169	E2 A3 A9
Numeric character reference	&#10345;	&#x2869;	&#10409;	&#x28A9;	&#10473;	&#x28E9;

	dots 1467	dots 1468	dots 14678
Gardner Salinas Braille		∂ (partial differential)	∇ (nabla symbol)

== Related 8-dot kantenji patterns ==
In the Japanese kantenji braille, the standard 8-dot Braille patterns 258, 1258, 2458, and 12458 are the patterns related to Braille pattern dots-146, since the two additional dots of kantenji patterns 0146, 1467, and 01467 are placed above the base 6-dot cell, instead of below, as in standard 8-dot braille.

Character information
Preview	⢒ (braille pattern dots-258)		⢓ (braille pattern dots-1258)		⢚ (braille pattern dots-2458)		⢛ (braille pattern dots-12458)	
Unicode name	BRAILLE PATTERN DOTS-258		BRAILLE PATTERN DOTS-1258		BRAILLE PATTERN DOTS-2458		BRAILLE PATTERN DOTS-12458	
Encodings	decimal	hex	dec	hex	dec	hex	dec	hex
Unicode	10386	U+2892	10387	U+2893	10394	U+289A	10395	U+289B
UTF-8	226 162 146	E2 A2 92	226 162 147	E2 A2 93	226 162 154	E2 A2 9A	226 162 155	E2 A2 9B
Numeric character reference	&#10386;	&#x2892;	&#10387;	&#x2893;	&#10394;	&#x289A;	&#10395;	&#x289B;

=== Kantenji using braille patterns 258, 1258, 2458, or 12458 ===
This listing includes kantenji using Braille pattern dots-146 for all 6349 kanji found in JIS C 6226-1978.

- - 草

==== Variants and thematic compounds ====
- - selector 3 + く/艹 = 艸
- - selector 5 + く/艹 = 禺
- - selector 6 + く/艹 = 莫
  - - selector 6 + selector 6 + く/艹 = 屮
- - く/艹 + selector 4 = 丘
- - く/艹 + selector 6 = 卉
- - 比 + く/艹 = 升
- - し/巿 + く/艹 = 黒

==== Compounds of 草 and 艹 ====
- - れ/口 + く/艹 = 嘆
- - 氷/氵 + く/艹 = 漢
- - く/艹 + い/糹/#2 = 難
  - - な/亻 + く/艹 + い/糹/#2 = 儺
  - - て/扌 + く/艹 + い/糹/#2 = 攤
  - - に/氵 + く/艹 + い/糹/#2 = 灘
- - つ/土 + く/艹 = 塔
- - く/艹 + く/艹 = 荒
  - - る/忄 + く/艹 = 慌
- - た/⽥ + く/艹 = 苗
  - - て/扌 + く/艹 = 描
  - - か/金 + く/艹 = 錨
- - け/犬 + く/艹 = 獲
- - の/禾 + く/艹 = 穫
- - え/訁 + く/艹 = 護
- - 心 + く/艹 = 菱
- - と/戸 + く/艹 = 著
  - - つ/土 + と/戸 + く/艹 = 墸
  - - み/耳 + と/戸 + く/艹 = 躇
- - く/艹 + ん/止 = 歎
- - く/艹 + 比 = 花
  - - つ/土 + く/艹 + 比 = 埖
  - - き/木 + く/艹 + 比 = 椛
  - - ま/石 + く/艹 + 比 = 硴
  - - の/禾 + く/艹 + 比 = 糀
  - - か/金 + く/艹 + 比 = 錵
- - く/艹 + ほ/方 = 芳
  - - か/金 + く/艹 + ほ/方 = 錺
  - - せ/食 + く/艹 + ほ/方 = 餝
  - - く/艹 + ほ/方 + や/疒 = 蔟
- - く/艹 + え/訁 = 芸
  - - く/艹 + く/艹 + え/訁 = 藝
    - - れ/口 + く/艹 + え/訁 = 囈
- - く/艹 + め/目 = 芽
- - く/艹 + 数 = 若
  - - る/忄 + く/艹 + 数 = 惹
- - く/艹 + ろ/十 = 苦
- - く/艹 + お/頁 = 英
  - - 日 + く/艹 + お/頁 = 暎
  - - へ/⺩ + く/艹 + お/頁 = 瑛
  - - ち/竹 + く/艹 + お/頁 = 霙
- - く/艹 + ひ/辶 = 茂
- - く/艹 + け/犬 = 茎
  - - く/艹 + く/艹 + け/犬 = 莖
- - く/艹 + へ/⺩ = 荘
  - - く/艹 + く/艹 + へ/⺩ = 莊
- - く/艹 + な/亻 = 荷
- - く/艹 + 囗 = 菌
- - く/艹 + き/木 = 菓
- - く/艹 + ち/竹 = 菜
- - く/艹 + か/金 = 華
  - - れ/口 + く/艹 + か/金 = 嘩
  - - 日 + く/艹 + か/金 = 曄
  - - 心 + く/艹 + か/金 = 樺
  - - え/訁 + く/艹 + か/金 = 譁
- - く/艹 + ふ/女 = 萎
- - く/艹 + れ/口 = 落
- - く/艹 + よ/广 = 葉
- - く/艹 + と/戸 = 葬
- - く/艹 + み/耳 = 葺
- - く/艹 + に/氵 = 蒸
- - く/艹 + た/⽥ = 蓄
- - く/艹 + す/発 = 蔵
  - - く/艹 + く/艹 + す/発 = 藏
- - く/艹 + て/扌 = 薄
- - く/艹 + そ/馬 = 薦
- - く/艹 + ま/石 = 薪
- - く/艹 + 火 = 薫
- - く/艹 + ゐ/幺 = 薬
  - - く/艹 + く/艹 + ゐ/幺 = 藥
- - く/艹 + 氷/氵 = 藩
- - く/艹 + ⺼ = 蘊
- - 氷/氵 + 宿 + く/艹 = 濛
- - く/艹 + 宿 + ら/月 = 臈
- - ふ/女 + 宿 + く/艹 = 艨
- - く/艹 + 龸 + の/禾 = 芟
- - く/艹 + 宿 + り/分 = 芬
- - く/艹 + 宿 + 心 = 芯
- - く/艹 + め/目 + ぬ/力 = 苅
- - く/艹 + 宿 + う/宀/#3 = 苑
- - く/艹 + ろ/十 + 囗 = 苒
- - く/艹 + 比 + か/金 = 苛
- - く/艹 + も/門 + selector 2 = 苞
- - く/艹 + も/門 + selector 5 = 苟
- - く/艹 + selector 1 + す/発 = 苣
- - く/艹 + れ/口 + と/戸 = 苫
- - く/艹 + す/発 + selector 1 = 苳
- - く/艹 + selector 5 + そ/馬 = 苴
- - く/艹 + な/亻 + し/巿 = 苻
- - く/艹 + 宿 + さ/阝 = 范
- - く/艹 + す/発 + れ/口 = 茖
- - く/艹 + selector 5 + こ/子 = 茣
- - く/艹 + selector 5 + ほ/方 = 茫
- - く/艹 + ゐ/幺 + ゐ/幺 = 茲
- - く/艹 + 囗 + れ/口 = 茴
- - く/艹 + 囗 + け/犬 = 茵
- - く/艹 + ふ/女 + れ/口 = 茹
- - く/艹 + ろ/十 + こ/子 = 荐
- - く/艹 + な/亻 + ま/石 = 莅
- - く/艹 + ぬ/力 + そ/馬 = 莇
- - く/艹 + は/辶 + selector 1 = 莚
- - く/艹 + り/分 + れ/口 = 莟
- - く/艹 + 宿 + な/亻 = 莢
- - く/艹 + け/犬 + と/戸 = 莽
- - く/艹 + selector 6 + 心 = 菴
- - く/艹 + selector 5 + り/分 = 菷
- - く/艹 + お/頁 + ろ/十 = 萃
- - く/艹 + ふ/女 + さ/阝 = 萋
- - く/艹 + 日 + ら/月 = 萌
- - く/艹 + り/分 + か/金 = 萍
- - く/艹 + ら/月 + ら/月 = 萠
- - く/艹 + に/氵 + selector 3 = 萢
- - く/艹 + 宿 + け/犬 = 萼
- - く/艹 + な/亻 + れ/口 = 葆
- - く/艹 + 龸 + り/分 = 董
- - く/艹 + 日 + selector 1 = 葩
- - く/艹 + い/糹/#2 + も/門 = 葯
- - く/艹 + 宿 + む/車 = 葷
- - く/艹 + ま/石 + し/巿 = 蒂
- - く/艹 + 宿 + し/巿 = 蒄
- - く/艹 + お/頁 + に/氵 = 蒐
- - く/艹 + 日 + し/巿 = 蒔
- - く/艹 + 宿 + そ/馬 = 蒙
- - く/艹 + り/分 + お/頁 = 蒼
- - く/艹 + け/犬 + の/禾 = 蓁
- - く/艹 + よ/广 + せ/食 = 蓆
- - く/艹 + こ/子 + む/車 = 蓊
- - く/艹 + し/巿 + ろ/十 = 蓐
- - く/艹 + 宿 + ね/示 = 蓑
- - く/艹 + よ/广 + な/亻 = 蓙
- - く/艹 + な/亻 + う/宀/#3 = 蓚
- - く/艹 + ま/石 + さ/阝 = 蔀
- - く/艹 + 宿 + ま/石 = 蔓
- - く/艹 + し/巿 + よ/广 = 蔕
- - く/艹 + selector 1 + う/宀/#3 = 蔘
- - く/艹 + と/戸 + ね/示 = 蔚
- - く/艹 + ね/示 + さ/阝 = 蔡
- - く/艹 + さ/阝 + ゑ/訁 = 蔭
- - く/艹 + 宿 + 氷/氵 = 蔽
- - く/艹 + の/禾 + た/⽥ = 蕃
- - く/艹 + ん/止 + ん/止 = 蕋
- - く/艹 + 龸 + け/犬 = 蕚
- - く/艹 + に/氵 + 数 = 蕩
- - く/艹 + ち/竹 + た/⽥ = 蕾
- - く/艹 + り/分 + え/訁 = 薈
- - く/艹 + 囗 + え/訁 = 薗
- - く/艹 + や/疒 + selector 2 = 薙
- - く/艹 + selector 6 + ま/石 = 薜
- - く/艹 + ほ/方 + selector 2 = 薨
- - く/艹 + 宿 + 数 = 薮
- - く/艹 + selector 4 + な/亻 = 薹
- - く/艹 + 宿 + き/木 = 藁
- - く/艹 + 日 + ね/示 = 藉
- - く/艹 + そ/馬 + 日 = 藐
- - く/艹 + 龸 + 数 = 藪
- - く/艹 + え/訁 + 氷/氵 = 藹
- - く/艹 + 心 + 心 = 蘂
- - く/艹 + 宿 + に/氵 = 蘯
- - く/艹 + 龸 + ま/石 = 蘰
- - む/車 + 宿 + く/艹 = 蟇
- - む/車 + 龸 + く/艹 = 蠖
- - え/訁 + 宿 + く/艹 = 謨
- - そ/馬 + 宿 + く/艹 = 驀
- - く/艹 + 宿 + や/疒 = 艱

==== Compounds of 禺 ====
- - な/亻 + く/艹 = 偶
- - う/宀/#3 + く/艹 = 寓
- - ひ/辶 + く/艹 = 遇
- - さ/阝 + く/艹 = 隅
- - く/艹 + 心 = 愚
- - く/艹 + selector 5 + く/艹 = 藕
- - や/疒 + う/宀/#3 + く/艹 = 嵎

==== Compounds of 莫 ====
- - き/木 + く/艹 = 模
- - ⺼ + く/艹 = 膜
- - く/艹 + ぬ/力 = 募
- - く/艹 + つ/土 = 墓
- - く/艹 + し/巿 = 幕
  - - 宿 + く/艹 + し/巿 = 冪
  - - す/発 + く/艹 + し/巿 = 羃
- - く/艹 + る/忄 = 慕
- - く/艹 + 日 = 暮
- - の/禾 + selector 6 + く/艹 = 糢
- - む/車 + selector 6 + く/艹 = 蟆
- - そ/馬 + selector 6 + く/艹 = 貘
- - う/宀/#3 + 宿 + く/艹 = 寞
- - て/扌 + 宿 + く/艹 = 摸
- - に/氵 + 宿 + く/艹 = 漠
- - け/犬 + 宿 + く/艹 = 獏

==== Compounds of 丘 ====
- - く/艹 + り/分 = 兵
  - - き/木 + く/艹 + り/分 = 梹
  - - か/金 + く/艹 + り/分 = 鋲
- - く/艹 + や/疒 = 岳
- - む/車 + く/艹 + selector 4 = 蚯
- - さ/阝 + く/艹 + selector 4 = 邱
- - そ/馬 + く/艹 + selector 4 = 駈

==== Compounds of 卉 ====
- - く/艹 + selector 6 + も/門 = 蒭
- - く/艹 + selector 6 + つ/土 = 蕘

==== Compounds of 升 ====
- - 日 + く/艹 = 昇
- - き/木 + 比 + く/艹 = 枡
- - さ/阝 + 日 + く/艹 = 陞

==== Compounds of 黒 ====
- - 火 + く/艹 = 燻
- - よ/广 + し/巿 + く/艹 = 廛
- - ゆ/彳 + し/巿 + く/艹 = 黴
- - ⺼ + し/巿 + く/艹 = 黶

==== Other compounds ====
- - こ/子 + く/艹 = 告
  - - は/辶 + く/艹 = 造
    - - る/忄 + は/辶 + く/艹 = 慥
  - - せ/食 + く/艹 = 酷
  - - 日 + こ/子 + く/艹 = 晧
  - - き/木 + こ/子 + く/艹 = 梏
  - - え/訁 + こ/子 + く/艹 = 誥
  - - 火 + こ/子 + く/艹 = 靠
- - く/艹 + 宿 + せ/食 = 鵠
- - に/氵 + く/艹 = 流
- - へ/⺩ + く/艹 = 琉
- - よ/广 + く/艹 = 疏
  - - 心 + よ/广 + く/艹 = 蔬
- - ま/石 + く/艹 = 硫
- - ほ/方 + 宿 + く/艹 = 旒
- - き/木 + 宿 + く/艹 = 梳
- - 龸 + selector 4 + く/艹 = 毓
- - せ/食 + 宿 + く/艹 = 醯
  - - く/艹 + 宿 + 火 = 熏
    - - せ/食 + く/艹 + 火 = 醺
- - そ/馬 + く/艹 = 馴
- - く/艹 + さ/阝 = 危
  - - ⺼ + く/艹 + さ/阝 = 脆
  - - え/訁 + く/艹 + さ/阝 = 詭
  - - み/耳 + く/艹 + さ/阝 = 跪
  - - せ/食 + く/艹 + さ/阝 = 鮠
- - く/艹 + う/宀/#3 = 急
- - ち/竹 + く/艹 = 筑
- - め/目 + 宿 + く/艹 = 瞿
- - く/艹 + そ/馬 + 比 = 麁
