= Italian Braille =

Braille alphabet of the Italian language

- Script type: alphabet
- Print basis: Italian alphabet
- Languages: Italian

Related scripts
- Parent systems: Braille: French Braille; Italian Braille

Italian Braille is the braille alphabet of the Italian language, both in Italy and in Switzerland. It is very close to French Braille, with some differences in punctuation.

== Alphabet ==
Since French Braille does not have a letter for ó, Italian Braille uses ⠬ ò for both ò and ó.

| a | b | c | d | e | f | g | h | i |
| l | m | n | o | p | q | r | s | t |
| u | v | z | é | à | è | ù | ì | ò, ó |

If other letters are needed, such as j, k, w, x, y or accented vowels such as î, French Braille assignments are used. ⠚ j is used as the digit 0.

== Numbers ==
Digits are the first ten letters of the alphabet, and are marked by ⠼, as in English Braille.

Although a dot as full stop (period) is ⠲, a dot as a digit separator, as in 3.500 for three thousand five hundred, is ⠄ (⠼⠉⠄⠑⠚⠚).

== Punctuation ==
| ⠂ (braille pattern dots-2) | ⠲ (braille pattern dots-256) | ⠄ (braille pattern dots-3) | ⠢ (braille pattern dots-26) | ⠖ (braille pattern dots-235) | ⠆ (braille pattern dots-23) | ⠒ (braille pattern dots-25) | ⠄ (braille pattern dots-3) | ⠤ (braille pattern dots-36) | ⠔ (braille pattern dots-35) |
| , | . (stop) | . (num.) | ? | ! | ; | : | ' | - | * |

⠲ is the full stop / period; ⠄ is the digit separator in numbers.

| ... | ... | ... | ... | ... |
| « ... » | ( ... ) or [ ... ]* | ( ... ) | [ ... ] | { ... } |

*According to Unesco (2013), Italian Braille uses the old French parentheses ⠶⠀⠶ as square brackets. According to the Unione Italiana Ciechi di Legnano, those are used for parentheses; square brackets are not given. And according to the Unione Italiana dei Ciechi e degli Ipovedenti, square brackets are ⠷⠀⠾; Unesco and the Unione agree on the assignment of ⠢⠀⠔ to the parentheses, as in the chart above, and the Unione has ⠯⠀⠽ for braces. (⠯ ç and ⠽ y are not part of the Italian alphabet.) However, the Unione specifies than the symmetrically paired brackets are mathematical notation, so it may be that the old, generic ⠶⠀⠶ is the convention for either parentheses or square brackets in non-mathematical text.

== Formatting ==
| ⠼ (braille pattern dots-3456) | ⠨ (braille pattern dots-46) | ⠸ (braille pattern dots-456) |
| (number) | (capital) | (italic) |
