= Catalan Braille =

Braille alphabet of the Catalan language

- Script type: alphabet
- Print basis: Catalan alphabet
- Languages: Catalan

Related scripts
- Parent systems: Braille: French Braille; Catalan Braille

Catalan Braille is the braille alphabet of the Catalan language.

It is very close to French Braille: it uses the 26 letters of the basic braille alphabet, plus several additional letters for ç and what are, in print, vowel letters with diacritics; these differ from their French values only in the need to accommodate the Catalan acute accent: ú, ó, í for what are in French Braille ù, œ, ì :

ç	à	é	è	í	ï	ó	ò	ú	ü

Print digraphs are written as digraphs in braille as well.

== Punctuation ==
⠐ (braille pattern dots-5)	⠂ (braille pattern dots-2)	⠲ (braille pattern dots-256)	⠢ (braille pattern dots-26)	⠖ (braille pattern dots-235)	⠄ (braille pattern dots-3)	⠆ (braille pattern dots-23)	⠤ (braille pattern dots-36)	⠤ (braille pattern dots-36)	⠄ (braille pattern dots-3)
middot	,	.	?	!	'	;	-	—	...

The middot is used to distinguish double-el ⟨l·l⟩, ⠇⠐⠇, from the digraph ⟨ll⟩, ⠇⠇.

...	...
" ... "	( ... )

== Formatting ==
⠼ (braille pattern dots-3456)	⠨ (braille pattern dots-46)
(digit)	(caps)

The capital sign needs to be repeated for each letter of an initialism, so ACIC is ⠨⠁⠨⠉⠨⠊⠨⠉.

== See also ==
- Abecedari Braille de 1931, a 1931 alphabet with different letter assignments and punctuation, including dropped digits for ordinal numbers.
- Alfabet Braille, a chart from the Associació Catalana per a la Integració del Cec with some dubious letter assignments, such as the loss of a distinct acute accent and the use of the colon for ⟨ï⟩.
