= Braille pattern dots-246 =

Braille pattern

6-dot braille cells
⠀	⠁	⠃	⠉	⠙	⠑	⠋	⠛	⠓	⠊	⠚	⠈	⠘
⠄	⠅	⠇	⠍	⠝	⠕	⠏	⠟	⠗	⠎	⠞	⠌	⠜
⠤	⠥	⠧	⠭	⠽	⠵	⠯	⠿	⠷	⠮	⠾	⠬	⠼
⠠	⠡	⠣	⠩	⠹	⠱	⠫	⠻	⠳	⠪	⠺	⠨	⠸
shift down	⠂	⠆	⠒	⠲	⠢	⠖	⠶	⠦	⠔	⠴	⠐	⠰

The Braille pattern dots-246 ( ⠪ ) is a 6-dot braille cell with the middle left, and top and bottom right dots raised, or an 8-dot braille cell with the upper-middle left, and top and lower-middle right dots raised. It is represented by the Unicode code point U+282a, and in Braille ASCII with an open bracket: [.

Character information
Preview	⠪ (braille pattern dots-246)	
Unicode name	BRAILLE PATTERN DOTS-246	
Encodings	decimal	hex
Unicode	10282	U+282A
UTF-8	226 160 170	E2 A0 AA
Numeric character reference	&#10282;	&#x282A;
Braille ASCII	91	5B

== Unified Braille ==
In unified international braille, the braille pattern dots-246 is used to represent close-mid to open-mid back rounded vowels, such as /o/, /o̞/, or /ɔ/ when multiple letters correspond to these values, and is otherwise assigned as needed.

=== Table of unified braille values ===
French Braille	Œ, mathematical 9, im-, -ition, "son"
English Braille	Ow
German Braille	Ö
Bharati Braille	औ / ਔ / ઔ / ঔ / ଔ / ఔ / ಔ / ഔ / ஔ / ඖ / و
Icelandic Braille	Ö
IPA Braille	/œ/
Russian Braille	Э
Slovak Braille	Ó
Arabic Braille	أو
Thai Braille	ึ eu
Luxembourgish Braille	9 (nine)

== Other braille ==
Japanese Braille	ko / こ / コ
Korean Braille	eu / ㅡ
Mainland Chinese Braille	ai
Taiwanese Braille	yao, -iao / ㄧㄠ, ) (end parenthesis)
Two-Cell Chinese Braille	m- -é/-ó, 没 méi
Nemeth Braille	cancel (open)
Gardner Salinas Braille	9
Algerian Braille	ـً (tanwīn)

== Plus dots 7 and 8 ==
Related to Braille pattern dots-246 are Braille patterns 2467, 2468, and 24678, which are used in 8-dot braille systems, such as Gardner-Salinas and Luxembourgish Braille.

Character information
Preview	⡪ (braille pattern dots-2467)		⢪ (braille pattern dots-2468)		⣪ (braille pattern dots-24678)	
Unicode name	BRAILLE PATTERN DOTS-2467		BRAILLE PATTERN DOTS-2468		BRAILLE PATTERN DOTS-24678	
Encodings	decimal	hex	dec	hex	dec	hex
Unicode	10346	U+286A	10410	U+28AA	10474	U+28EA
UTF-8	226 161 170	E2 A1 AA	226 162 170	E2 A2 AA	226 163 170	E2 A3 AA
Numeric character reference	&#10346;	&#x286A;	&#10410;	&#x28AA;	&#10474;	&#x28EA;

	dots 2467	dots 2468	dots 24678
Gardner Salinas Braille		√ (radical)	〈 (open angle bracket)

== Related 8-dot kantenji patterns ==
In the Japanese kantenji braille, the standard 8-dot Braille patterns 358, 1358, 3458, and 13458 are the patterns related to Braille pattern dots-246, since the two additional dots of kantenji patterns 0246, 2467, and 02467 are placed above the base 6-dot cell, instead of below, as in standard 8-dot braille.

Character information
Preview	⢔ (braille pattern dots-358)		⢕ (braille pattern dots-1358)		⢜ (braille pattern dots-3458)		⢝ (braille pattern dots-13458)	
Unicode name	BRAILLE PATTERN DOTS-358		BRAILLE PATTERN DOTS-1358		BRAILLE PATTERN DOTS-3458		BRAILLE PATTERN DOTS-13458	
Encodings	decimal	hex	dec	hex	dec	hex	dec	hex
Unicode	10388	U+2894	10389	U+2895	10396	U+289C	10397	U+289D
UTF-8	226 162 148	E2 A2 94	226 162 149	E2 A2 95	226 162 156	E2 A2 9C	226 162 157	E2 A2 9D
Numeric character reference	&#10388;	&#x2894;	&#10389;	&#x2895;	&#10396;	&#x289C;	&#10397;	&#x289D;

=== Kantenji using braille patterns 358, 1358, 3458, or 13458 ===
This listing includes kantenji using Braille pattern dots-246 for all 6349 kanji found in JIS C 6226-1978.

- - 子

==== Variants and thematic compounds ====
- - selector 1 + こ/子 = 孑
- - selector 3 + こ/子 = 巽
- - selector 4 + こ/子 = 共
- - selector 5 + こ/子 = 呉
- - selector 6 + こ/子 = 公
- - こ/子 + selector 1 = 工
- - こ/子 + selector 3 = 耒
- - 数 + こ/子 = 甲
- - し/巿 + こ/子 = 黄

==== Compounds of 子 ====
- - 龸 + こ/子 = 享
  - - る/忄 + 龸 + こ/子 = 惇
  - - き/木 + 龸 + こ/子 = 椁
  - - え/訁 + 龸 + こ/子 = 諄
  - - せ/食 + 龸 + こ/子 = 醇
- - 仁/亻 + こ/子 = 仔
- - う/宀/#3 + こ/子 = 字
- - ろ/十 + こ/子 = 存
  - - て/扌 + ろ/十 + こ/子 = 拵
  - - き/木 + ろ/十 + こ/子 = 栫
  - - く/艹 + ろ/十 + こ/子 = 荐
- - と/戸 + こ/子 = 孝
  - - れ/口 + と/戸 + こ/子 = 哮
- - の/禾 + こ/子 = 季
  - - せ/食 + こ/子 = 酵
  - - る/忄 + の/禾 + こ/子 = 悸
- - こ/子 + ふ/女 = 好
- - こ/子 + selector 1 + ゐ/幺 = 孕
- - こ/子 + 宿 + ろ/十 = 孛
- - こ/子 + ふ/女 + ゑ/訁 = 孥
- - と/戸 + 宿 + こ/子 = 孱
- - こ/子 + 宿 + ゐ/幺 = 孳
- - 龸 + 龸 + こ/子 = 學
- - こ/子 + 宿 + 氷/氵 = 敦
- - こ/子 + 龸 + selector 3 = 斈
- - 心 + 宿 + こ/子 = 李
- - に/氵 + 宿 + こ/子 = 潺

==== Compounds of 孑 ====
- - こ/子 + こ/子 = 孤
  - - 心 + こ/子 + こ/子 = 菰
- - さ/阝 + こ/子 = 郭
  - - よ/广 + さ/阝 + こ/子 = 廓
  - - き/木 + さ/阝 + こ/子 = 槨
- - こ/子 + を/貝 = 孔
  - - れ/口 + こ/子 + を/貝 = 吼
- - こ/子 + ゐ/幺 = 孫
  - - ひ/辶 + こ/子 + ゐ/幺 = 遜
- - こ/子 + 龸 + 氷/氵 = 孜
- - こ/子 + selector 5 + ゐ/幺 = 孩
- - こ/子 + 宿 + お/頁 = 孰
- - こ/子 + ち/竹 + の/禾 = 孺

==== Compounds of 巽 ====
- - ひ/辶 + こ/子 = 選
- - て/扌 + 宿 + こ/子 = 撰
- - せ/食 + 宿 + こ/子 = 饌

==== Compounds of 共 ====
- - な/亻 + こ/子 = 供
- - た/⽥ + こ/子 = 異
  - - 日 + こ/子 = 暴
    - - 日 + 日 + こ/子 = 曝
    - - に/氵 + 日 + こ/子 = 瀑
    - - 火 + こ/子 = 爆
    - - む/車 + こ/子 = 翼
- - ⺼ + こ/子 = 臀
- - も/門 + こ/子 = 閧
  - - も/門 + も/門 + こ/子 = 鬨
- - こ/子 + る/忄 = 恭
- - こ/子 + の/禾 = 殿
  - - に/氵 + こ/子 + の/禾 = 澱
  - - や/疒 + こ/子 + の/禾 = 癜
- - れ/口 + selector 4 + こ/子 = 哄
- - て/扌 + selector 4 + こ/子 = 拱
- - に/氵 + selector 4 + こ/子 = 洪
- - む/車 + selector 4 + こ/子 = 蛬

==== Compounds of 呉 ====
- - ふ/女 + こ/子 = 娯
- - く/艹 + selector 5 + こ/子 = 茣
- - む/車 + selector 5 + こ/子 = 蜈
- - す/発 + こ/子 = 虞
- - え/訁 + こ/子 = 誤
- - こ/子 + そ/馬 + 比 = 麌

==== Compounds of 公 ====
- - 心 + こ/子 = 松
  - - に/氵 + 心 + こ/子 = 淞
  - - 心 + 心 + こ/子 = 菘
  - - と/戸 + 心 + こ/子 = 鬆
- - 宿 + こ/子 = 窓
- - い/糹/#2 + こ/子 = 総
  - - い/糹/#2 + い/糹/#2 + こ/子 = 總
- - み/耳 + こ/子 = 聡
  - - み/耳 + み/耳 + こ/子 = 聰
- - ゑ/訁 + こ/子 = 訟
- - こ/子 + む/車 = 翁
  - - く/艹 + こ/子 + む/車 = 蓊
  - - こ/子 + 宿 + せ/食 = 鶲
- - 心 + selector 6 + こ/子 = 枩
- - か/金 + selector 6 + こ/子 = 瓮
- - ふ/女 + selector 6 + こ/子 = 舩
- - む/車 + selector 6 + こ/子 = 蚣
- - お/頁 + selector 6 + こ/子 = 頌

==== Compounds of 工 ====
- - そ/馬 + こ/子 = 差
  - - れ/口 + そ/馬 + こ/子 = 嗟
  - - や/疒 + そ/馬 + こ/子 = 嵯
  - - て/扌 + そ/馬 + こ/子 = 搓
  - - き/木 + そ/馬 + こ/子 = 槎
  - - へ/⺩ + そ/馬 + こ/子 = 瑳
  - - ま/石 + そ/馬 + こ/子 = 磋
  - - い/糹/#2 + そ/馬 + こ/子 = 縒
  - - み/耳 + そ/馬 + こ/子 = 蹉
- - 氷/氵 + こ/子 = 江
- - ゐ/幺 + こ/子 = 紅
- - を/貝 + こ/子 = 貢
  - - き/木 + を/貝 + こ/子 = 槓
  - - 火 + を/貝 + こ/子 = 熕
- - こ/子 + ぬ/力 = 功
- - こ/子 + も/門 = 巧
- - こ/子 + 氷/氵 = 攻
- - こ/子 + う/宀/#3 = 虹
- - こ/子 + お/頁 = 項
- - て/扌 + こ/子 + selector 1 = 扛
- - き/木 + こ/子 + selector 1 = 杢
- - に/氵 + こ/子 + selector 1 = 汞
- - ま/石 + こ/子 + selector 1 = 矼
- - ん/止 + こ/子 + selector 1 = 缸
- - ⺼ + こ/子 + selector 1 = 肛
- - え/訁 + こ/子 + selector 1 = 訌
- - き/木 + 宿 + こ/子 = 杠

==== Compounds of 耒 ====
- - こ/子 + い/糹/#2 = 耕
- - こ/子 + え/訁 = 耘
- - こ/子 + 宿 + ひ/辶 = 耙
- - こ/子 + 宿 + ら/月 = 耜
- - こ/子 + ぬ/力 + そ/馬 = 耡
- - こ/子 + し/巿 + ろ/十 = 耨

==== Compounds of 甲 ====
- - や/疒 + こ/子 = 岬
- - こ/子 + て/扌 = 押
- - こ/子 + せ/食 = 鴨
- - も/門 + 数 + こ/子 = 匣
- - れ/口 + 数 + こ/子 = 呷
- - け/犬 + 数 + こ/子 = 狎
- - ⺼ + 数 + こ/子 = 胛
- - も/門 + 宿 + こ/子 = 閘

==== Compounds of 黄 ====
- - き/木 + こ/子 = 横
- - よ/广 + こ/子 = 広
  - - て/扌 + こ/子 = 拡
  - - ま/石 + こ/子 = 砿
  - - か/金 + こ/子 = 鉱
  - - よ/广 + よ/广 + こ/子 = 廣
    - - つ/土 + よ/广 + こ/子 = 壙
    - - 日 + よ/广 + こ/子 = 曠
    - - ま/石 + よ/广 + こ/子 = 礦
  - - い/糹/#2 + よ/广 + こ/子 = 絋
- - ち/竹 + し/巿 + こ/子 = 簧
- - 龸 + し/巿 + こ/子 = 黌
- - き/木 + た/⽥ + こ/子 = 冀
- - て/扌 + て/扌 + こ/子 = 擴
- - の/禾 + た/⽥ + こ/子 = 糞
- - か/金 + か/金 + こ/子 = 鑛

==== Other compounds ====
- - つ/土 + こ/子 = 去
  - - る/忄 + こ/子 = 怯
  - - に/氵 + こ/子 = 法
  - - ぬ/力 + つ/土 + こ/子 = 劫
  - - に/氵 + つ/土 + こ/子 = 溘
  - - も/門 + つ/土 + こ/子 = 闔
- - こ/子 + く/艹 = 告
  - - こ/子 + に/氵 = 浩
  - - 日 + こ/子 + く/艹 = 晧
  - - き/木 + こ/子 + く/艹 = 梏
  - - え/訁 + こ/子 + く/艹 = 誥
  - - 火 + こ/子 + く/艹 = 靠
- - こ/子 + 宿 = 児
  - - こ/子 + こ/子 + 宿 = 兒
    - - め/目 + こ/子 = 睨
    - - な/亻 + こ/子 + 宿 = 倪
    - - そ/馬 + こ/子 + 宿 = 貎
    - - ち/竹 + こ/子 + 宿 = 霓
    - - も/門 + こ/子 + 宿 = 鬩
    - - せ/食 + こ/子 + 宿 = 鯢
    - - こ/子 + 宿 + そ/馬 = 麑
- - ゆ/彳 + こ/子 = 弧
- - け/犬 + こ/子 = 狐
- - こ/子 + 日 = 暦
- - こ/子 + ん/止 = 歴
  - - き/木 + こ/子 + ん/止 = 櫪
  - - に/氵 + こ/子 + ん/止 = 瀝
  - - や/疒 + こ/子 + ん/止 = 癧
  - - む/車 + こ/子 + ん/止 = 轣
  - - ち/竹 + こ/子 + ん/止 = 靂
- - 囗 + こ/子 = 向
  - - ひ/辶 + 囗 + こ/子 = 迥
  - - せ/食 + 囗 + こ/子 = 餉
- - れ/口 + こ/子 = 喉
- - ち/竹 + こ/子 = 筍
- - こ/子 + と/戸 = 事
  - - こ/子 + こ/子 + と/戸 = 亊
- - こ/子 + 心 = 怱
- - な/亻 + 宿 + こ/子 = 偬
- - る/忄 + 宿 + こ/子 = 愡
- - ぬ/力 + 宿 + こ/子 = 刧
- - へ/⺩ + に/氵 + こ/子 = 琺
- - 日 + 宿 + こ/子 = 皓
- - こ/子 + う/宀/#3 + り/分 = 窖
- - 宿 + 宿 + こ/子 = 窗
- - ゐ/幺 + 宿 + こ/子 = 絳
- - そ/馬 + 宿 + こ/子 = 羔
- - 囗 + 宿 + こ/子 = 觚
