= Vietnamese Braille =

Braille alphabet of the Vietnamese language

- Script type: Alphabet
- Print basis: Vietnamese alphabet
- Languages: Vietnamese

Related scripts
- Parent systems: Braille: French Braille; Vietnamese Braille

Vietnamese Braille is the braille alphabet used for the Vietnamese language. It is very close to French Braille (and thus to a lesser degree to English Braille), but with the addition of tone letters. Vietnamese Braille is known in Vietnamese as chữ nổi, literally "raised letters", while electronic braille displays are called màn hình chữ nổi.

== Alphabet ==
Apart from đ (which is brailled as ⠮ and the addition of five tone letters, the Vietnamese Braille alphabet is nearly identical to French Braille: the only other difference is the substitution of Vietnamese ư ơ for French ü œ, and the dropping of those letters which are not needed in Vietnamese. However, because of the tone letters, the design is different: Vietnamese Braille has separate letters for vowels and tones, so the French Braille letters for é à è ù are not used; they are written instead as tone ◌́ or ◌̀ plus the vowels a e u.

Vietnamese Braille
a	b	c	d	e		g	h	i		
k	l	m	n	o	p	q	r	s	t	(caps)
u	v	x	y	đ					(num)	
â	ê		ô				ư	ơ		ă
,	;	:	.	◌̉	⠖ (braille pattern dots-235)	⠶ (braille pattern dots-2356)	⠦ (braille pattern dots-236)	◌́	⠴ (braille pattern dots-356)	◌̀
⠄ (braille pattern dots-3)		◌̃								◌̣
1	2	3	4	5	6	7	8	9	0	(space)

- One braille letter is used for each Latin letter.
- Tone letters (transcribing the diacritics ◌̉ ◌́ ◌̀ ◌̃ ◌̣) are written immediately before the vowel.

For example,

Màn	hình	chữ	nổi.
⠨ (braille pattern dots-46) ⠍ (braille pattern dots-134) ⠰ (braille pattern dots-56) ⠁ (braille pattern dots-1) ⠝ (braille pattern dots-1345)	⠓ (braille pattern dots-125) ⠰ (braille pattern dots-56) ⠊ (braille pattern dots-24) ⠝ (braille pattern dots-1345)	⠉ (braille pattern dots-14) ⠓ (braille pattern dots-125) ⠤ (braille pattern dots-36) ⠳ (braille pattern dots-1256)	⠝ (braille pattern dots-1345) ⠢ (braille pattern dots-26) ⠹ (braille pattern dots-1456) ⠊ (braille pattern dots-24) ⠲ (braille pattern dots-256)
cap–m–◌̀–a–n	h–◌̀–i–n–h	c–h–◌̃–ư	n–◌̉–ô–i–stop

== Punctuation ==
,	;	:	.	... “...”	?	!	...	-	*
... (...)			... [...] OR {...}			/			

== See also ==
- Vietnamese sign languages
