= French Braille =

Original braille alphabet, used for French

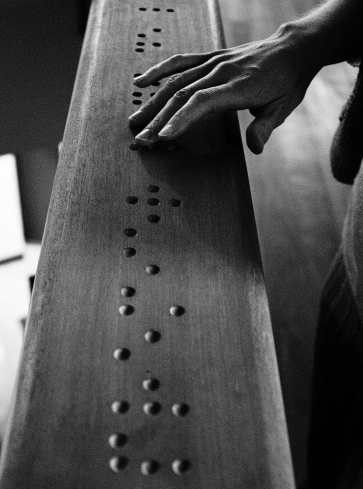
- Script type: Alphabet (non-linear)
- Creator: Louis Braille
- Time period: 1837
- Print basis: French alphabet
- Languages: French

Related scripts
- Parent systems: night writing: early braille; French Braille
- Child systems: English Braille; German Braille; Arabic Braille etc., etc.

Unicode
- Unicode range: U+2800 to U+283F

French Braille is the original braille alphabet, and the basis of almost all others. The alphabetic order of French has become the basis of the international braille convention, used by most braille alphabets around the world. However, only the 25 basic letters of the French alphabet plus w have become internationalized; the additional letters are largely restricted to French Braille and the alphabets of some neighboring European countries.

== Letters ==
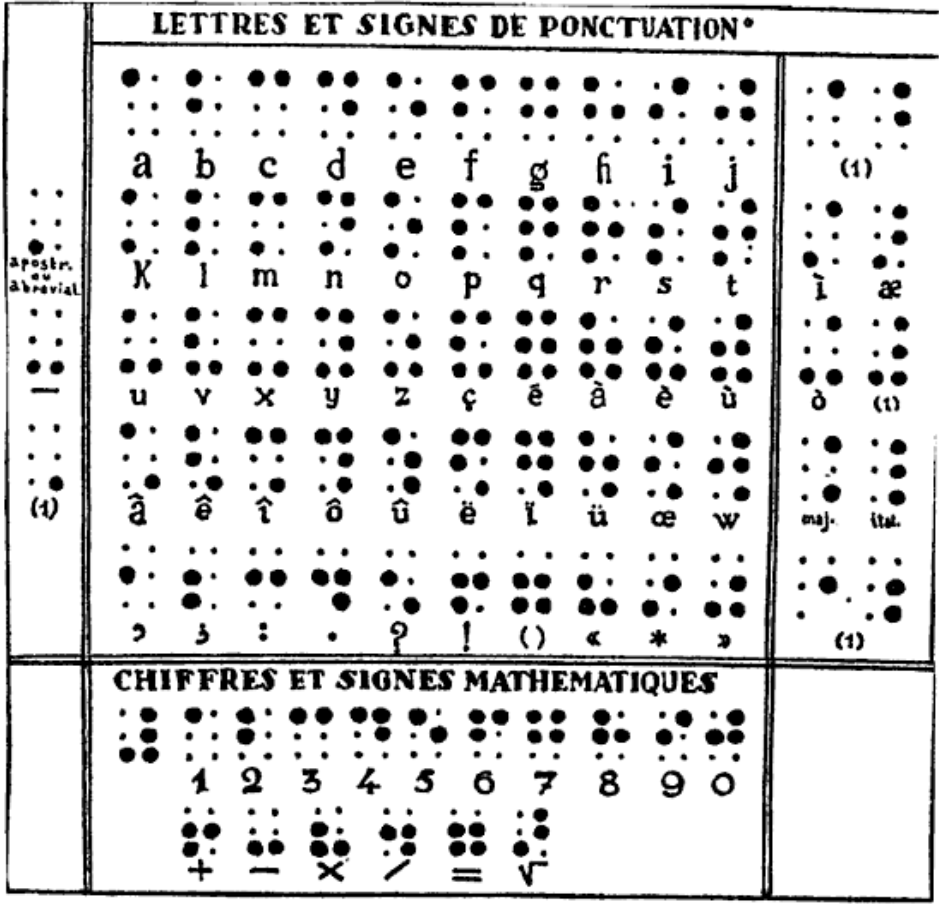
The final form of Braille's alphabet, according to Henri (1952). The decade diacritics are listed at left, and the supplementary letters are assigned to the appropriate decade at right. Characters are derived by combining the diacritic on the left with the basic letters at top. "(1)" indicates markers for musical and mathematical notation. Parentheses and quotation marks follow English Braille usage. The number sign is used to create several arithmetical symbols which are no longer in use, or that continue in Antoine notation.

The original French Braille alphabet, according to Loomis (1942). Most accented letters of the 1829 version have been replaced with digraphs, but these are not used today.

In numerical order by decade, the letters are:

| a, 1 | b, 2 | c, 3 | d, 4 | e, 5 | f, 6 | g, 7 | h, 8 | i, 9 | j, 0 |
| k | l | m | n | o | p | q | r | s | t |
| u | v | x | y | z | ç | é | à | è | ù |
| â, 1 | ê, 2 | î, 3 | ô, 4 | û, 5 | ë, 6 | ï, 7 | ü, 8 | œ, ö, 9 | w |

For the purposes of accommodating a foreign alphabet, the letters ì, ä, ò may be added:

| ì | æ, ä | ò |

There are also numerous contractions and abbreviations in French braille.

== Punctuation ==
Punctuation is as follows:

| , | ; | : ÷ | . / | ? subscript | ! + | " = | ( | × | ) |
| ’. (Note: The space in numbers between thousands.) | – − | / | @ (Note: Also marks the end of a verse.) | * (Note: Used to mark a footnote or endnote.) | | | | | |

The lower values are readings within numbers (after the Antoine number marker: see below).

== Formatting and mode ==
Formatting and mode-changing marks are:

| Capitals | Emphasis | (start) | (end) | Super- script | Symbol | Currency | Traditional number | Antoine number |

As in English Braille, the capital sign is doubled for all caps.

⟨⠢⟩ and ⟨⠔⟩ are used to begin and end emphasis within a word.

The symbol marker combines with a following initial letter to produce the following:

⠐⠏ §, ⠐⠿ &, ⠐⠉ ©, ⠐⠗ ®, ⠐⠞ ™, ⠐⠬ % (⠐⠬⠬ ‰, ⠐⠬⠬⠬ ‱)

The currency marker combines with a following initial for:

⠘⠽ ¥, ⠘⠑ €, ⠘⠎ $, ⠘⠇ £

It is also used in comic strips:

⠘⠻ (speech bubble), ⠘⠳ (thought bubble)

== Numbers ==
The traditional system of digits is to add the number sign ⠼ in front of the letters of the first decade (a–j), with ⠼⠁ being ⟨1⟩ and ⠼⠚ being ⟨0⟩. This is the internationally recognized number system. However, in French Braille a new system, the Antoine braille digits, is used for mathematics and is recommended for all academic publications. This uses ⠠ combined with the first nine letters of the fourth decade, from ⠠⠡ for ⟨1⟩ to ⠠⠪ for ⟨9⟩, with the preceding ⠠⠼ for ⟨0⟩. The period/decimal and fraction bar also change. The Antoine numbers are being promoted in France and Luxembourg, but are not much used with French Braille in Quebec.

French Braille digits
| | | 0 | 1 | 2 | 3 | 4 | 5 | 6 | 7 | 8 | 9 |
| Traditional | ⠼ (braille pattern dots-3456) | ⠚ (braille pattern dots-245) | ⠁ (braille pattern dots-1) | ⠃ (braille pattern dots-12) | ⠉ (braille pattern dots-14) | ⠙ (braille pattern dots-145) | ⠑ (braille pattern dots-15) | ⠋ (braille pattern dots-124) | ⠛ (braille pattern dots-1245) | ⠓ (braille pattern dots-125) | ⠊ (braille pattern dots-24) |
| Antoine | ⠠ (braille pattern dots-6) | ⠼ (braille pattern dots-3456) | ⠡ (braille pattern dots-16) | ⠣ (braille pattern dots-126) | ⠩ (braille pattern dots-146) | ⠹ (braille pattern dots-1456) | ⠱ (braille pattern dots-156) | ⠫ (braille pattern dots-1246) | ⠻ (braille pattern dots-12456) | ⠳ (braille pattern dots-1256) | ⠪ (braille pattern dots-246) |

See the punctuation section above for Antoine mathematical notation.

== History ==
A page from an undated early braille textbook, showing both readings, with additional readings not included in Loomis. It is captioned Écritare à l'usage des Aveugles. Procédé de L. Braille. Professeur à l'institut N^{l} des J^{nes} Aveugles.

Readings have changed slightly since modern braille was first published in 1837. The greatest change has been various secondary readings which were added to the alphabet and then abandoned.

Historical readings in Loomis (1942)
| dec. | numeric sequence | | | | | | | | | | supp. | |
|---|---|---|---|---|---|---|---|---|---|---|---|---|
| ⠀ (braille pattern blank) | a 1 | b 2 | c 3 | d 4 | e 5 | f 6 | g 7 | h 8 | i 9 | j 0 | ⠈ (braille pattern dots-4) | ⠘ (braille pattern dots-45) |
| ' | k | l | m | n | o | p | q | r | s | t | ì ian | æ ien |
| - | u | v | x | y | z | ç oin | é | à | è | ù ieu | ò ion | (NUM) |
| ⠠ (braille pattern dots-6) | â an | ê in | î on | ô un | û eu | ë ou | ï oi | ü ch | œ gn | w (i)ll | (CAP) | (ITAL) |
| | , | ; | : | . | ? | ! | () | « | * | » × | ⠐ (braille pattern dots-5) | ⠰ (braille pattern dots-56) |

== Similar alphabets ==
In general, only the assignments of the basic 26 letters of the French alphabet are retained in other braille alphabets. For example, among the additional letters, in German Braille only ü and ö coincide with French Braille. However, there are several alphabets which are much more closely related. Italian Braille is identical to the French apart from doubling up French Braille ò to Italian ó and ò, since French has no ó. Indeed, a principal difference of these alphabets is the remapping of French vowels with a grave accent (à è ì ò ù) to an acute accent (á é í ó ú), as the French alphabet does not support acute accents apart from é. Spanish changes all five of these vowels, as well as taking ü. Portuguese Braille is also very similar to the French, though the shift of grave to acute accents necessitated a chain of other changes, such as circumflex to grave, and the Portuguese tildes were taken from French diaereses (Portuguese ã õ for French ä ö/œ). The continental Scandinavian languages took the extended French letters â (for å), ä/æ, and ö/ø. Vietnamese Braille is also quite similar, though it has added tone letters, and uses French ⠵ z for d, which is pronounced like z.

Related alphabets
| Braille: | ⠯ (braille pattern dots-12346) | ⠿ (braille pattern dots-123456) | ⠷ (braille pattern dots-12356) | ⠮ (braille pattern dots-2346) | ⠾ (braille pattern dots-23456) | ⠡ (braille pattern dots-16) | ⠣ (braille pattern dots-126) | ⠩ (braille pattern dots-146) | ⠹ (braille pattern dots-1456) | ⠱ (braille pattern dots-156) | ⠫ (braille pattern dots-1246) | ⠻ (braille pattern dots-12456) | ⠳ (braille pattern dots-1256) | ⠪ (braille pattern dots-246) | ⠺ (braille pattern dots-2456) | ⠌ (braille pattern dots-34) | ⠜ (braille pattern dots-345) | ⠬ (braille pattern dots-346) |
| French | ç | é | à | è | ù | â | ê | î | ô | û | ë | ï | ü | œ/ö | w | ì | æ/ä | ò |
| Portuguese | ç | é | à | è | ù | â | ê | í | ô | ú | á | ï | ü | õ | ò/w | ì | ã | ó |
| Catalan | ç | é | à | è | ú | – | – | – | – | – | – | ï | ü | ó | w | í | – | ò |
| Spanish/Galician | – | – | á | é | ú | – | – | – | – | – | – | ñ | ü | – | w | í | – | ó |
| Italian | – | é | à | è | ù | – | – | – | – | – | – | – | – | ó | w | ì | – | ò |
| Luxembourgish (old) | – | é | – | – | – | – | – | – | – | – | ë | – | – | – | w | – | ä | – |
| Scandinavian (Note: Swedish, Danish, Norwegian, and Finnish.) | – | – | – | – | – | å | – | – | – | – | – | – | – | ö/ø | w | – | ä/æ | – |
| Vietnamese | – | – | (Note: Vietnamese à è ì ò ù are written as a tone letter plus a e i o u.) | – | | â | ê | – | ô | – | – | – | ư | ơ | – | | ă | |
| Braille Patterns | ⠯ | ⠿ | ⠷ | ⠮ | ⠾ | ⠡ | ⠣ | ⠩ | ⠹ | ⠱ | ⠫ | ⠻ | ⠳ | ⠪ | ⠺ | ⠌ | ⠜ | ⠬ |

Catalan Braille adds ⠇⠐⠇ for print ⟨l·l⟩, and Spanish Braille uses ⠻ (French ï) for the non-French consonant ñ. Luxembourgish Braille has since switch to eight-point braille, adding a dot at point 8 for the three vowels with accents.

Punctuation and formatting are in general similar as well, though changes in French punctuation over time means that some languages use older French conventions. For example, French parentheses and quotation marks originally had the opposite values they do today, values which remain in English Braille. Other changes have accrued over time, and in some cases vary from country to country. For example, Italian Braille uses the old French quotation marks ⠦⠀⠴ and asterisk ⠔, but also shifted the old French parentheses ⠶⠀⠶ to brackets and innovated ⠢⠀⠔ for parentheses; in addition, it uses point 3, ⠄, for both apostrophe and full stop / period.

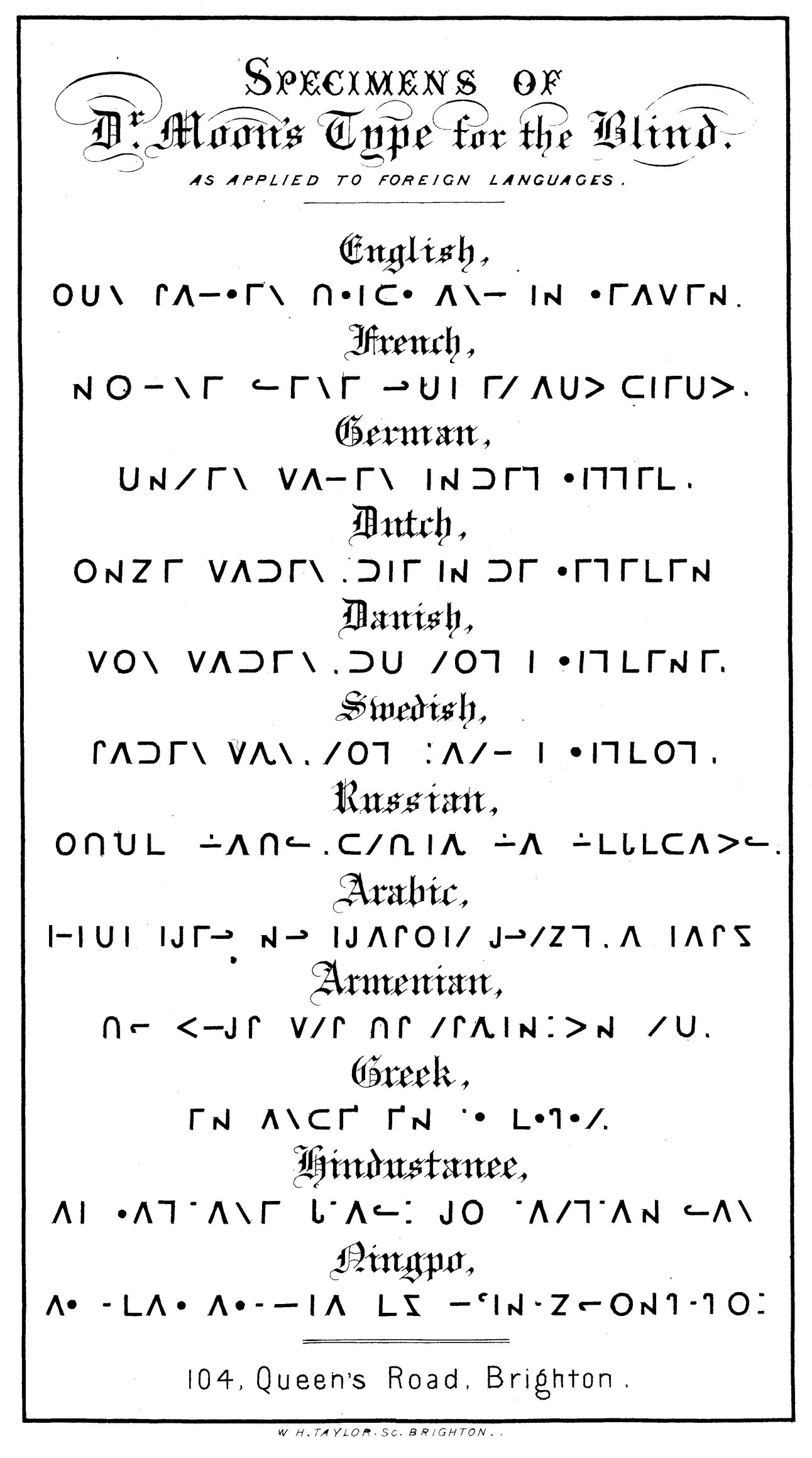
A sample of Moon type in various languages including French.

Moon type is a simplification of the Latin alphabet for embossing. An adaptation of French-reading blind people has been proposed.
