= Taiwanese Braille =

Braille script used in Taiwan for Standard Mandarin

Taiwanese Braille ⠅⠒⠂⠳⠈⠀⠙⠞⠈⠓⠱⠐
- Script type: Semisyllabary
- Print basis: Zhuyin
- Languages: Standard Mandarin

Related scripts
- Parent systems: Night writing: Braille; Taiwanese Braille

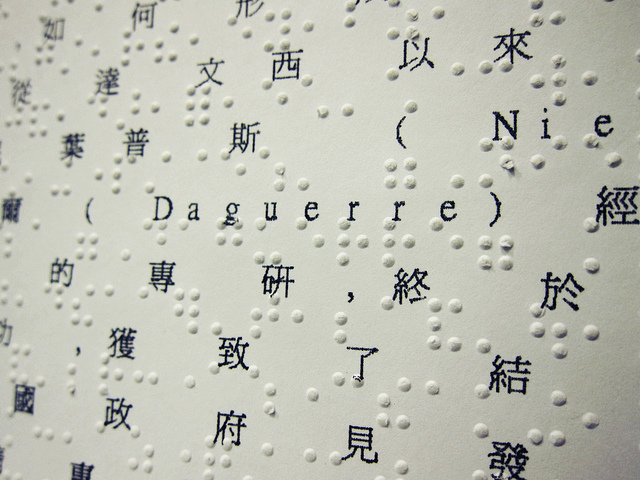
A quadriscriptal text in Chinese and Roman print and braille. In the lower right corner is the character 結 jié, written in braille as ⠅⠬⠂ gyé; compare 西 xī at the center top, rendered in braille as ⠑⠡⠄ syī.

Taiwanese Braille is the braille script used in Taiwan for Taiwanese Mandarin (Guoyu). Although based marginally on international braille, most consonants have been reassigned; also, like Chinese Braille, Taiwanese Braille is a semi-syllabary.

An example is,

國			語		點			字			記			號		
⠅ (braille pattern dots-13)	⠒ (braille pattern dots-25)	⠂ (braille pattern dots-2)	⠳ (braille pattern dots-1256)	⠈ (braille pattern dots-4)	⠙ (braille pattern dots-145)	⠞ (braille pattern dots-2345)	⠈ (braille pattern dots-4)	⠓ (braille pattern dots-125)	⠱ (braille pattern dots-156)	⠐ (braille pattern dots-5)	⠅ (braille pattern dots-13)	⠡ (braille pattern dots-16)	⠐ (braille pattern dots-5)	⠗ (braille pattern dots-1235)	⠩ (braille pattern dots-146)	⠐ (braille pattern dots-5)
ㄍ	ㄨㄛ	ˊ	ㄩ	ˇ	ㄉ	ㄧㄢ	ˇ	ㄗ	ㄭ	ˋ	ㄐ	ㄧ	ˋ	ㄏ	ㄠ	ˋ
guó			yǔ		diǎn			zì			jì			hào		

== Charts ==
=== Initials ===
Zhuyin	ㄅ	ㄆ	ㄇ	ㄈ	ㄉ	ㄊ	ㄋ	ㄌ	ㄍ	ㄎ	ㄏ	ㄐ	ㄑ	ㄒ	ㄓ	ㄔ	ㄕ	ㄖ	ㄗ	ㄘ	ㄙ
Pinyin	b	p	m	f	d	t	n	l	g	k	h	j	q	x	zh	ch	sh	r	z	c	s
Braille	⠕ (braille pattern dots-135)	⠏ (braille pattern dots-1234)	⠍ (braille pattern dots-134)	⠟ (braille pattern dots-12345)	⠙ (braille pattern dots-145)	⠋ (braille pattern dots-124)	⠝ (braille pattern dots-1345)	⠉ (braille pattern dots-14)	⠅ (braille pattern dots-13)	⠇ (braille pattern dots-123)	⠗ (braille pattern dots-1235)	⠅ (braille pattern dots-13)	⠚ (braille pattern dots-245)	⠑ (braille pattern dots-15)	⠁ (braille pattern dots-1)	⠃ (braille pattern dots-12)	⠊ (braille pattern dots-24)	⠛ (braille pattern dots-1245)	⠓ (braille pattern dots-125)	⠚ (braille pattern dots-245)	⠑ (braille pattern dots-15)

The braille letters for zhuyin/pinyin ㄍ g (/k/), ㄘ c (/tsʰ/), and ㄙ s (/s/) double for the alveolo-palatal consonants ㄐ j (/tɕ/), ㄑ q (/tɕʰ/), and ㄒ x (/ɕ/). The latter are followed by close front vowels, namely ㄧ i (/i/) and ㄩ ü (/y/), so the distinction between g, c, s (or z, k, h) and j, q, x in zhuyin and pinyin is redundant.

=== Medial + rime ===
Each medial + rime in zhuyin is written with a single letter in braille.

Zhuyin	/ㄦ	ㄚ	ㄛ	ㄜ	ㄝ	ㄞ	ㄟ	ㄠ	ㄡ	ㄢ	ㄣ	ㄤ	ㄥ
Pinyin	-i/er	a	o	e	ê	ai	ei	ao	ou	an	en	ang	eng
Braille	⠱ (braille pattern dots-156)	⠜ (braille pattern dots-345)	⠣ (braille pattern dots-126)	⠮ (braille pattern dots-2346)	⠢ (braille pattern dots-26)	⠺ (braille pattern dots-2456)	⠴ (braille pattern dots-356)	⠩ (braille pattern dots-146)	⠷ (braille pattern dots-12356)	⠧ (braille pattern dots-1236)	⠥ (braille pattern dots-136)	⠭ (braille pattern dots-1346)	⠵ (braille pattern dots-1356)
Zhuyin	ㄧ	ㄧㄚ	ㄧㄛ		ㄧㄝ	ㄧㄞ		ㄧㄠ	ㄧㄡ	ㄧㄢ	ㄧㄣ	ㄧㄤ	ㄧㄥ
Pinyin	i	ia	io		ie	iai		iao	iu	ian	in	iang	ing
Braille	⠡ (braille pattern dots-16)	⠾ (braille pattern dots-23456)	⠴ (braille pattern dots-356)		⠬ (braille pattern dots-346)	⠢ (braille pattern dots-26)		⠪ (braille pattern dots-246)	⠎ (braille pattern dots-234)	⠞ (braille pattern dots-2345)	⠹ (braille pattern dots-1456)	⠨ (braille pattern dots-46)	⠽ (braille pattern dots-13456)
Zhuyin	ㄨ	ㄨㄚ	ㄨㄛ			ㄨㄞ	ㄨㄟ			ㄨㄢ	ㄨㄣ	ㄨㄤ	ㄨㄥ
Pinyin	u	ua	uo			uai	ui			uan	un	uang	ong
Braille	⠌ (braille pattern dots-34)	⠔ (braille pattern dots-35)	⠒ (braille pattern dots-25)			⠶ (braille pattern dots-2356)	⠫ (braille pattern dots-1246)			⠻ (braille pattern dots-12456)	⠿ (braille pattern dots-123456)	⠸ (braille pattern dots-456)	⠯ (braille pattern dots-12346)
Zhuyin	ㄩ				ㄩㄝ					ㄩㄢ	ㄩㄣ		ㄩㄥ
Pinyin	ü				üe					üan	ün		iong
Braille	⠳ (braille pattern dots-1256)				⠦ (braille pattern dots-236)					⠘ (braille pattern dots-45)	⠲ (braille pattern dots-256)		⠖ (braille pattern dots-235)

⠱ is used for both the empty rime -i ([ɨ]), which is not written in zhuyin, and the rime ㄦ er ([ɐɚ]). See for example 斯 sī (⠑⠱⠄) located above the word Daguerre in the image at right.

=== Tone Marks ===
Tone:	1	2	3	4	0
Zhuyin	—	ˊ	ˇ	ˋ	˙
Pinyin	ˉ	ˊ	ˇ	ˋ	—
Braille	⠄	⠂	⠈	⠐	⠁

Tone is always marked. This includes toneless syllables such as 了 le, rendered ⠉⠮⠁lė in the image above-right.

=== Punctuation marks ===
Punctuation

Print	。 ・	，	；	、	？	！	：
Braille	⠤	⠆	⠰	⠠	⠕	⠇	⠒⠒

Print	＿＿	﹏﹏	……	—	—— ——	※	◎
Braille	⠰⠰	⠠⠤	⠐⠐⠐	⠐⠂	⠐⠂ ⠐⠂	⠈⠼	⠪⠕

Print	「 ... 」	『 ... 』	（ ... ）	〔 ... 〕	｛ ... ｝
Braille	⠰⠤ ... ⠤⠆	⠦⠦ ... ⠴⠴	⠪ ... ⠕	⠯ ... ⠽	⠦ ... ⠴
