= English Braille =

Tactile writing system for English

English Braille Grade-2 Braille British Revised Braille
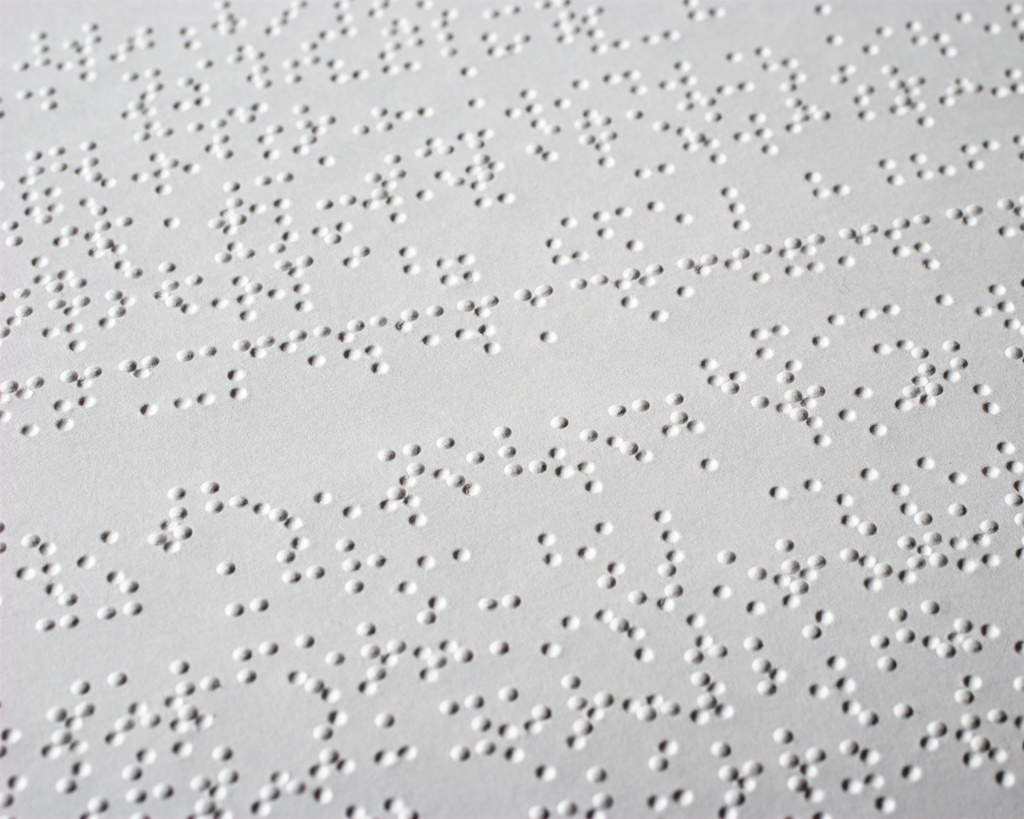
- Script type: Alphabet (non-linear)
- Period: 1902
- Print basis: English alphabet
- Languages: English

Related scripts
- Parent systems: night writing: early braille; French Braille; English Braille
- Child systems: unified international braille Unified English Braille; Irish Braille; Hebrew Braille

Unicode
- Unicode range: U+2800 to U+283F

English Braille, also known as Grade 2 Braille, is the braille alphabet used for English. It consists of around 250 letters (phonograms), numerals, punctuation, formatting marks, contractions, and abbreviations (logograms). Some English Braille letters, such as ⠿ ⟨for⟩, correspond to more than one letter in print.

There are three levels of complexity in English Braille. Grade 1 is a nearly one-to-one transcription of printed English and is restricted to basic literacy. Grade 2, which is nearly universal beyond basic literacy materials, abandons one-to-one transcription in many places (such as the letter ⠿ ⟨for⟩) and adds hundreds of abbreviations and contractions. Both Grade 1 and Grade 2 have been standardized. "Grade 3" is any of various personal shorthands that are almost never found in publications. Most of this article describes the 1994 American edition of Grade 2 Braille, which is largely equivalent to British Grade 2 Braille. Some of the differences with Unified English Braille, which was officially adopted by various countries between 2005 and 2012, are discussed at the end.

Braille is frequently portrayed as a re-encoding of the English orthography used by sighted people. However, braille is a separate writing system, not a variant of the printed English alphabet.

== History ==
Braille was introduced to Britain in 1861. In 1876, a French-based system with a few hundred English contractions and abbreviations was adopted as the predominant script in Great Britain. However, the contractions and abbreviations proved unsatisfactory, and in 1902 the current grade-2 system, called Revised Braille, was adopted in the British Commonwealth. In 1878, the ideal of basing all braille alphabets of the world on the original French alphabetic order was accepted by Britain, Germany, and Egypt (see International Braille). In the United States at the time, three scripts were used: non-braille New York Point; American Braille, which was reordered so that the most frequent letters were the ones with the fewest dots; and a variation of English Braille, which was reordered to match the English alphabet, assigning the values wxyz to the letters that, in France and England, stood for xyzç. A partially contracted English Braille, Grade 1 1/2, was adopted in Britain in 1918, and fully contracted Grade 2, with a few minor concessions to the Americans, was adopted in 1932. The concessions were to swap the British two-dot capital sign with the one-dot emphasis sign, which had generally been omitted anyway (as capitals had been in New York Point), to drop a few religious contractions from general usage, and to introduce a rule stating that contractions and abbreviations should not span "major" syllable boundaries.

In 1991, an American proposal was made for Unified English Braille, intended to eliminate the confusion caused by competing standards for academic uses of English Braille. After several design revisions, it has since been adopted by the Commonwealth countries starting in 2005, and by the United States (starting a gradual introduction after 2012). The chief differences with Revised Braille are in punctuation, symbols, and formatting, more accurately reflecting print conventions in matters such as brackets, mathematical notation, and typefaces.

== System ==
The 64 braille patterns are arranged into decades based on the numerical order of those patterns. The first decade are the numerals 1 through 0, which utilize only the top and mid row of the cell; the 2nd through 4th decades are derived from the first by adding dots to the bottom row; the 5th decade is created by shifting the first decade downwards. In addition, for each decade there are two additional mirror-image patterns, and finally there are three patterns that utilize only the bottom row of the cell. The final pattern, the empty cell ⟨⠀⟩, is used as a space; it has the same width as the others.

Cells 1 through 25 plus 40 (w) are assigned to the 26 letters of the basic Latin alphabet. The other 37 cells are often used for punctuation and typically assigned different values in different languages. The English grade-two values are as follows; cells with dots on only the right side do not have equivalents in printed English and are explained in the notes.

The 64 braille cells and their values in English Grade-2 Braille
	main sequence										shifted right	
1st decade	1 · a	2 · b	3 · c	4 · d	5 · e	6 · f	7 · g	8 · h	9 · i	0 · j	(accent)*	(abbrev.)^{§}
2nd decade	k	l	m	n	o	p	q	r	s	t	st · /	ar
3rd decade	u	v	x	y	z	and	for	of	the	with	-ing	(num)* · -ble^{†}
4th decade	ch	gh	sh	th	wh	ed	er	ou	ow	w	(disp) · (emph)*^{§}	(abbrev.)^{§}
5th decade	, · -ea-	; · -bb-	: · -cc-	. · -dd-^{†}	en	! · -ff- · to^{†}	() · -gg-	? · “	in	” · by^{†}	(abbrev.)^{§}	(letter)*^{§}
bottom row	'		– · com-^{†}								(caps)*^{§}	(space)

* Formatting marks, explained below
^{§} Abbreviation signs, illustrated below
^{†} Abolished in Unified English Braille
^{¤} The period, ⟨⠲⟩, is distinguished from the decimal point, ⟨⠨⟩. The apostrophe, ⟨⠄⟩, is distinguished from the closing quotation mark marks.

== Alphabet ==
The English Braille alphabet has letters that correspond directly to the 26 letters of the English print alphabet plus ligatures that are equivalent to digraphs and sequences in print.

a	b	c	d	e	f	g	h	i	j	(accent)	
k	l	m	n	o	p	q	r	s	t	st	ar
u	v	x	y	z	and	for	of	the	with	-ing	-ble^{†}
ch	gh	sh	th	wh	ed	er	ou	ow	w	(emph.)	
-ea-	-bb-	-cc-	-dd-^{†}	en	-ff-	-gg-		in		(caps)	(letter)

^{†} Abolished in Unified English Braille

Some of these ligatures transcribe common words, such as and or of, but they are not words: Pronunciation and meaning are ignored, and only spelling is relevant. For example, ⠮ ⟨the⟩ is commonly used when the sequence of print letters the appears, not just for the word "the". That is, ⠮ ⟨the⟩ is the letter "the" in braille, as in the two-letter word ⠮⠝ then (the-n). Similarly, hand is written h-and, roof (which sounds nothing like the word "of") is written r-o-of, and forest is written with three letters in braille, ⠿⠑⠌ for-e-st. Numbers are used this way as well—7th is written ⠼⠛⠹ #-7-th, and here printed English approximates normal practice in braille. There are numerous conventions for when a print sequence is "contracted" this way in braille, and when it is spelled out in full.

The ligatures ⟨-ing⟩ and ⟨-ble⟩ may not begin a word (as in *bled: ⠼⠙ would be read instead as ⟨4⟩), but are used everywhere else (as in problem, trouble).

The ligatures of the third decade, ⟨and, for, of, the, with⟩, take precedence over the letters of later decades. For example, then is written ⠮⠝ the-n, not *⠹⠢ th-en. When standing as words adjacent to other such words, or to ⠁ a, no space is left between them. For example, and the, for a, with the, of a are all fused together.

When printed ch, gh, sh, th are pronounced as two sounds, as in Shanghai, hogshead, and outhouse, then they are written as two braille letters rather than with the ligatures ⟨gh, sh, th⟩. Generally, other ligatures should not be used if they might cause problems with legibility, as with the ing in lingerie, though they tend to be with familiar words, such as ginger and finger, even if their pronunciation is divided between syllables. None of the ligatures are to be used across the boundaries of compound words. For example, ⠷ ⟨of⟩ is not used in twofold, nor ⠆ ⟨bb⟩ in dumbbell. The rules state that they should not span a prefix and stem either, so for example the ed in deduce, the er of rerun and derail, and the ble of sublet should be written out in full. In practice this is variable, as it depends upon the awareness of the writer. The of in professor, for example, might not be recognized spanning prefix and stem, and often a-cc-ept or a-dd-r-e-s-s are accepted, despite the technical violation. There is also conflict with the overriding tendency to contract sequences that fall within a single syllable. So the same writer who divides the er in derive may allow the ligature in derivation. A similar pattern emerges from suffixes: ⟨ed⟩ is not used in freedom, since it spans stem and suffix, but is used in freed, because it forms a single syllable with the stem. What is considered to constitute a prefix or suffix is somewhat arbitrary: ⟨st⟩ is not used in Charlestown, for example, but it is in Charleston. Ligatures may also not separate digraphs or diphthongs in print. For example, aerial does not use ⟨er⟩, Oedipus does not use ⟨ed⟩, and tableau does not use ⟨ble⟩. Also, it is normal to use the letter ⟨ea⟩ for the broken vowel in i-d-ea-s or c-r-ea-t-e, despite it being pronounced as two sounds rather than one as in head or ocean.

Ligatures should not be used for acronyms that are pronounced as a string of letters. That is, DEA should not use the letter ⟨ea⟩, nor PST the letter ⟨st⟩. Such letters are acceptable in acronyms that are pronounced as a word, however, if the result is not obscure.

The letters of the fifth decade are often used in the past tense and other grammatical forms: when rub becomes rubbed, in braille the letter ⟨b⟩ is moved down a dot to indicate the bb. However, those letters which double as punctuation marks—⟨ea, bb, cc, dd, ff, gg⟩—may only occur sandwiched in the middle of a word, not at the beginning or end, in order to avoid confusion with the punctuation. That is, *sea, ebb, add, cuff, egg must be spelled out in full, though the ligatures are used in season, added (a-dd-ed), cuffs, and eggs. Because of legibility problems (see "lower contractions" in the next section), they may not come in contact with an apostrophe or hyphen either. That is, in egg's and egg-plant, tea's and tea-time, the gg and ea must be spelled out in full. If the print letters span an obvious affix, the braille ligature is not used (preamble, reanalyze, pineapple, subbasement), but they are used in words such as accept and address where the morphology has become opaque. In order to keep the spelling regular, compounds of words starting with ea keep the ea spelled out: uneasy, anteater, southeast do not use the ligature ⟨ea⟩ because easy, eater, east do not use it. These are the least-preferred ligatures: any other will be used instead. Thus wedding is w-ed-d-ing (not *we-dd-ing) and office is of-f-i-c-e (not *o-ff-i-c-e).

Many of the rules for when to use ligatures, contractions, and abbreviations differ when a word is divided at the end of a line of text, because some of them may not come in contact with the hyphen that divides the word. See the references for details.

The accent mark ⟨⠈⟩ (printed hereinafter with the character @) shows that there is a diacritic on the following letter, as in ⟨se@nor⟩ señor, ⟨fa@cade⟩ façade, ⟨caf@e⟩ café, ⟨na@ive⟩ naïve, and ⟨@angstr@om⟩ ångström. In normal braille text, noting the precise diacritic is not important, as it can be easily understood from context, or simply ignored. Where diacritics are critical, technical braille transcription must be used.

A diacritic in a word of foreign origin prevents the accented letter from combining with another into a ligature. For example, señor is not written with the ligature ⟨en⟩ as *⟨s-@-en-o-r⟩, because it would not be clear if the accent were supposed to be on the e (as é) or on the n. However, English words are contracted. Thus blessèd is written ⟨b-l-e-s-s-@-ed⟩, and coëducational is ⟨c-o-@-ed-u-c-ation-a-l⟩.

== Punctuation marks ==
EBAE punctuation & symbols
(space)	,	;	:	. (period)	. (decimal)	!	|	&	* † ‡	(next letter accented)	# (number mode)	
'	‘		’		( )	(	)	[		]	{	}
〃 (ditto)		? “	”	/	\	...			-	–	—	

Braille punctuation is somewhat variable, just as there is variation in printed English between curly and straight quotation marks. They fail to make some distinctions found in print. For example, in EBAE, both opening and closing parentheses are written ⟨⠶⟩, with spacing used to distinguish; in UEB, they are ⟨⠐⠣⟩ and ⟨⠐⠜⟩. On the other hand, EBAE distinguishes period ⟨⠲⟩ vs. decimal point ⟨⠨⟩ (UEB does not). EBAE and UEB, just like (non-typewriter) print, distinguish apostrophe ⟨⠄⟩, ⟨’⟩ right inner quotation mark ⟨⠠⠴⟩, ⟨〃⟩ ditto mark ⟨⠐⠂⟩, and ⟨”⟩ right outer quotation mark ⟨⠴⟩.

In EBAE, ⟨⠤⟩ is the hyphen ⟨-⟩, ⟨⠤⠤⟩ the dash ⟨–⟩, ⟨⠤⠤⠤⠤⟩ the "double dash" ⟨—⟩, and ⟨⠄⠄⠄⟩ is the ellipsis ⟨…⟩. When words or letters are replaced by multiple dashes or dots in print, in EBAE ⠤⠤⠤⠤ and ⠄⠄⠄⠄ are used, with a matching number of characters. In UEB, these symbols are ⟨-⟩ ⟨⠤⟩, ⟨–⟩ ⟨⠠⠤⟩, ⟨—⟩ ⟨⠐⠠⠤⟩, and ⟨…⟩ ⟨⠲⠲⠲⟩.

In EBAE, the reference mark, or "asterisk" (⠔⠔), is used for all reference marks — *, †, ‡, etc., including numbered footnotes. Unlike the asterisk in printed English, it is spaced on both sides, apart from associated footnote letters or numbers, which follow it immediately. So, ⟨word*⟩ is transcribed ⟨⠘⠺⠀⠔⠔⟩, as is ⟨word^{‡}⟩; the numbered footnote in ⟨word^{3}⟩ is written ⟨⠘⠺⠀⠔⠔⠼⠉⟩. In UEB, they are distinguished, matching print: ⟨*⟩ ⟨⠐⠔⟩, ⟨†⟩ ⟨⠈⠠⠹⟩, ⟨‡⟩ ⟨⠈⠠⠻⟩.

The ditto mark, ⟨⠐⠂⟩, which occupies two cells, is only used once per line, in contrast to normal practice in print.

In addition to being used for apostrophe and capitalization, dot 3 ⟨⠄⟩ and dot 6 ⟨⠠⟩ are used as combining characters. In EBAE, they combine with parentheses to form brackets ⟨⠠⠶ ... ⠶⠄⟩; and in EBAE & UEB, dot 6 combines with quotation marks to form inner quotation marks ⟨⠠⠦ ... ⠴⠄⟩. Together, they form the termination sign ⟨⠠⠄⟩ (ending an all-caps passage). Also ⟨⠎⠄⟩, the section mark (§) (UEB: ⟨⠘⠎⟩).

The accent mark (here called the print symbol indicator) is used with punctuation when it stands alone, rather than suffixed to a word or number. For example, if someone's response in a dialogue is transcribed ⟨"?"⟩, in braille that would be written ⟨⠦⠈⠦⠴⟩. It is also used to derive a few symbols in EBAE: ⟨%⟩ ⟨⠈⠒⠏⟩, ⟨$⟩ ⟨⠲⟩ (before a number) / ⟨⠈⠲⟩ (elsewhere), ⟨&⟩ ⟨⠈⠯⟩. In UEB, ⟨%⟩ became ⟨⠨⠴⟩, and ⟨$⟩ became ⟨⠈⠎⟩ (everywhere).

In EBAE, "in general literature, the common mathematical signs of operation for + (plus), − (minus), × (times or by), ÷ (divided by), and = (equals) should always be expressed in words. The special mathematical signs should be used only in mathematics and scientific texts.". For example, ⟨2×5 ft.⟩ would be rendered ⟨⠼⠃⠀⠴⠼⠑⠀⠋⠞⠲⟩ (using ⟨⠴⟩ as a contraction of the word ⟨by⟩) in literary contexts, because EBAE did not have a symbol for ⟨×⟩ (though Nemeth Braille did). In UEB, ⟨×⟩ is ⟨⠐⠦⟩, so that phrase would be rendered ⟨⠼⠃⠐⠦⠼⠑⠀⠋⠞⠲⟩.

== Formatting marks ==
Braille has several formatting marks, sometimes called "composition signs", "register marks", or "indicators", which have no one-to-one correspondence with printed English. These are the number sign ⟨⠼⟩, the letter sign ⟨⠰⟩, the capital sign ⟨⠠⟩, the italic sign (or more accurately the emphasis sign) ⟨⠨⟩, and the termination sign ⟨⠠⠄⟩ (written cap–apostrophe). These immediately precede the sequence (word or number) they modify, without an intervening space.

(number)	1	2	3	4	5	6	7	8	9	0	(decimal)

All characters ⠁ a through ⠚ j are interpreted as the digits 1 through 0 when they follow a number sign. This reading ignores intervening numerical and arithmetical symbols such as commas, decimal points, and fraction bars, until a non-number-compatible character, such as a period or a letter after J, is encountered, at which point reading reverts to the alphabetical values a–j. The number sign is repeated after a slash that is not used as a fraction bar (like model number 15/07). For example, 1/20 (one twentieth) is ⟨⠼⠁⠌⠃⠚⟩, but 20/20 [vision] is ⟨⠼⠃⠚⠌⠼⠃⠚⟩. The braille number sign has no equivalent in print. It is sometimes transcribed as ⟨#⟩. However, this is misleading: an actual printed # is rendered in braille as ⟨No.⟩, without an intervening space before the number sign ⠼.

(letter)	(emph.)	(caps)	(stop)	(termination)	(non-Latin)

The letter sign is used to force the end of a series of numbers. For example, ⠙⠁ ⟨da⟩ preceded by a number sign, ⠼⠙⠁, is read as 41. If instead 4a is intended (as in a section or apartment number), then the letter sign is used to force a reading of a rather than 1 for the final character: ⠼⠙⠰⠁ ⟨4a⟩. It is also used to mark a character as standing for a letter rather than for a word. For example, ⠃ ⟨b⟩ on its own is normally read as the word but; to indicate that it is instead the letter b, the letter sign is used: ⠰⠃ b. Plurals of letters (mind your ps and qs) always use an apostrophe in braille, but other derivations may not, as in ⠰⠝⠹ nth [time]: ⠠⠎⠬ is Sing, ⠰⠠⠎⠬ is S-ing/Essing. The letter sign is also used to mark lower-case Roman numbers, as in ⠰⠊⠊⠊ ⟨iii⟩.

The capital(ization) sign marks the first letter of a word as capitalized. It may occur in the middle of a word for camel case, as in the name deAngelo. It is doubled to place a word in all caps; this must be repeated for each word of an all-cap text.

The emphasis (italic) sign marks emphatic formatting, equivalent to printed italic, bold, underlined, and small-capital text. A single italic sign emphasizes the entire word (or number). For two or three emphasized words, each takes a separate marker. For longer texts, a doubled marker is placed before the first word, and the end of the emphasis is indicated by marking the final emphasized word with a single italic sign.

When the capitalization or emphasis does not span the entire word, the beginning and end is marked with a hyphen. However, if the print word already contains a hyphen, the termination sign is used for the end. So, ⟨Hooray⟩ is written ⟨⠨⠠⠓⠕⠕⠤⠗⠁⠽⟩, but ⟨Hoo-ray⟩ is ⟨⠨⠠⠓⠕⠕⠠⠄⠤⠗⠁⠽⟩.

The comma ⟨⠂⟩ prefixed to a letter indicates that it is to be read as non-Latin, so that for example ⟨⠂⠁⟩ would be ⟨α⟩ if Greek symbols were being used.

== Contractions ==
Apart from words using the various abbreviations signs, covered in the next section, English Braille utilizes a number of unmarked contractions. These are similar to the contractions found in shorthand and stenoscript. As a rule, they are not used where they would obscure the text.

=== One-letter contractions ===
a	but	can	do	every	from, -self	go	have	I	just	
knowledge	like	more	not		people	quite	rather	so	that	still
us	very	it	you	as						com-^{†}
child		shall	this	which			out		will	
	be, be-	con-	dis-	enough	to+^{†}	were	his	in	by+,^{†} was	into+^{†}

^{†} Abolished in Unified English Braille
+ Joins with the following word

Note irregular ⠭ ⟨x⟩ for it, ⠵ ⟨z⟩ for as, and ⠶ ⟨gg⟩ for were. All 26 basic Latin letters are used apart from ⠁⠊⠕ ⟨a i o⟩, which already form words of their own.

These contractions are either independent words or (in the cases of con-, com-, dis-, -self) affixes, as in ⠐⠕⠋ ⟨one-f⟩ oneself. They cannot be treated as simple letters. For example, while the letter ⠭ ⟨x⟩ stands for the pronoun it, it cannot substitute for the sequence it in the word bite. They cannot be pluralized: *⟨cs⟩ is no good for "(tin) cans". This is true even of ⟨ch⟩ child not being usable for *grandchild, nor ⟨ou⟩ out in *without. (These must be spelled g-r-and-ch-i-l-d and with-ou-t.) However, a following apostrophe is acceptable: ⟨p's⟩ people's, ⟨c't⟩ can't, ⟨x'll⟩ it'll; as are hyphenated words like so-and-so. This behavior is distinct from ligatures such as ⠫ ⟨ed⟩ and ⠮ ⟨the⟩, which are used when the equivalent sequences are found in printed English, as in ⠗⠫ red and ⠝⠑⠫ need.

There is no semantic restriction: ⟨c⟩ can may be either the verb can or a tin can, and capitalized ⠠⠺ ⟨W⟩ and ⠠⠍ ⟨M⟩ are names Will and More. However, in the few cases where the basic letters would be words in their own right, they must be spelled out to avoid confusion. That is, because ⠩ ⟨sh⟩ stands for shall, it cannot be used for the word sh!, which must be spelled out as ⠎⠓ s-h. Similarly, ⟨st⟩ can be used for St. (as either Saint or Street) when marked as an abbreviation by a period, but otherwise should also be spelled out.

"Lower" contractions

Because contractions that occupy only the lower half of the braille cell mostly double as basic punctuation marks, legibility requires that, with few exceptions, they may not come in contact with actual punctuation marks; if they would, they should instead be spelled out. That is, any cell which follows without an intervening space should contain a dot in its top row. Most of the difficulties of when to use contractions are due to this complication.

The whole-word contractions of the fifth decade are ⟨bb⟩ be, ⟨en⟩ enough, ⟨ff⟩ to, ⟨gg⟩ were, ⟨?⟩ his, ⟨in⟩ in, ⟨”⟩ by/was. If one of these words occurs at the end of a sentence, or before a comma, it must be spelled out (though "enough" would still be partially contracted to en-ou-gh.) They cannot even be used in hyphenated words such as bride-to-be. However, much like Arabic prepositions, the prepositions ⟨to⟩, ⟨into⟩, and ⟨by⟩ join with a following word without an intervening space. This prevents ⟨by⟩ from being read as 'was'. That is, in He came by to see us, "by to see" is written as one word, ⠴⠖⠎⠑⠑. Word-joining is allowed as long as the upper half of the braille cell (dot 1 or 4) is used in the final word; to, by, into do join with in, enough, be, his, was, were, but the second word is spelled out.

The fifth-decade prefixes (be-, dis-, con-) may only be used if they occur at the beginning of a word (including in a compound word after a hyphen, or after by, to, into) and form a whole syllable. That is, they cannot be used in the words been, disk, conch nor (apart from double-duty be) as words in their own right, as in con artist. Com- is similar, but does not need to constitute a syllable: it is used for example in come and comb. However, because it uses only the bottom row of the cell, like the hyphen and the apostrophe, it cannot come in contact with either.

=== Longer contractions ===
Longer unmarked contractions are the following. Ligatures, such as ⠌ ⟨st⟩ in ⟨agst⟩ against, are underlined here for clarity.

⠁⠃ ⟨ab⟩ about, ⠁⠃⠧ ⟨abv⟩ above, ⠁⠉ ⟨ac⟩ according, ⠁⠉⠗ ⟨acr⟩ across, ⠁⠋ ⟨af⟩ after, ⠁⠋⠝ ⟨afn⟩ afternoon, ⠁⠋⠺ ⟨afw⟩ afterward, ⠁⠛ ⟨ag⟩ again, ⠁⠛⠌ ⟨agst⟩ against, ⠁⠇ ⟨al⟩ also, ⠁⠇⠍ ⟨alm⟩ almost, ⠁⠇⠗ ⟨alr⟩ already, ⠁⠇⠞ ⟨alt⟩ altogether, ⠁⠇⠹ ⟨alth⟩ although, ⠁⠇⠺ ⟨alw⟩ always
⠆⠉ ⟨bec⟩ because, ⠆⠋ ⟨bef⟩ before, ⠆⠓ ⟨beh⟩ behind, ⠆⠇ ⟨bel⟩ below, ⠆⠝ ⟨ben⟩ beneath, ⠆⠎ ⟨bes⟩ beside, ⠆⠞ ⟨bet⟩ between, ⠆⠽ ⟨bey⟩ beyond
⠃⠇ ⟨bl⟩ blind, ⠃⠗⠇ ⟨brl⟩ Braille
⠉⠙ ⟨cd⟩ could, ⠉⠧ ⟨cv⟩ -ceive, ⠉⠧⠛ ⟨cvg⟩ -ceiving
⠡⠝ ⟨chn⟩ children
⠙⠉⠇ ⟨dcl⟩ declare, ⠙⠉⠇⠛ ⟨dclg⟩ declaring
⠑⠊ ⟨ei⟩ either
⠋⠌ ⟨fst⟩ first, ⠋⠗ ⟨fr⟩ friend
⠛⠙ ⟨gd⟩ good, ⠛⠗⠞ ⟨grt⟩ great
⠓⠻⠋ ⟨herf⟩ herself, ⠓⠍ ⟨hm⟩ him, ⠓⠍⠋ ⟨hmf⟩ himself
⠊⠍⠍ ⟨imm⟩ immediate
⠇⠇ ⟨ll⟩ little, ⠇⠗ ⟨lr⟩ letter
⠍⠡ ⟨mch⟩ much, ⠍⠌ ⟨mst⟩ must, ⠍⠽⠋ ⟨myf⟩ myself
⠝⠑⠉ ⟨nec⟩ necessary, ⠝⠑⠊ ⟨nei⟩ neither
⠕⠄⠉ ⟨o'c⟩ o'clock
⠳⠗⠧⠎ ⟨ourvs⟩ ourselves
⠏⠙ ⟨pd⟩ paid, ⠏⠻⠓ ⟨perh⟩ perhaps
⠟⠅ ⟨qk⟩ quick
⠗⠚⠉ ⟨rjc⟩ rejoice, ⠗⠚⠉⠛ ⟨rjcg⟩ rejoicing
⠎⠡ ⟨sch⟩ such, ⠎⠙ ⟨sd⟩ said
⠩⠙ ⟨shd⟩ should
⠞⠙ ⟨td⟩ today, ⠞⠛⠗ ⟨tgr⟩ together, ⠞⠍ ⟨tm⟩ tomorrow, ⠞⠝ ⟨tn⟩ tonight
⠮⠍⠧⠎ ⟨themvs⟩ themselves
⠺⠙ ⟨wd⟩ would
⠭⠎ ⟨xs⟩ its, ⠭⠋ ⟨xf⟩ itself
⠽⠗ ⟨yr⟩ your, ⠽⠗⠋ ⟨yrf⟩ yourself, ⠽⠗⠧⠎ ⟨yrvs⟩ yourselves

These can only form longer words that are derivations of them and retain their meaning. For example, above in aboveboard, necessary in unnecessary, conceive in misconceive, and good in goodness are all well-formed braille, but not should in *shoulder nor said in *Port Said. Nor can they be used if a final -e is dropped, as in declaration. (This is why special -ing forms are available for declaring, rejoicing, and -ceiving: the -ing suffix would not work.)

They may be used as proper nouns (when capitalized), but not as parts of proper nouns. For example, little is acceptable for the name Little, but may not be used within Doolittle; similarly, the contraction for good may not be used in the name Goody. (There are too many unpredictable names for this to be workable.)

After, blind and friend may only be used in longer words when followed by a consonant. (They are too ambiguous otherwise.)

== Abbreviations ==
Initial letter	–Final letter

Besides unmarked contractions, words are abbreviated with any of several abbreviation signs. All of these signs use only the right-hand side of the braille cell. ⟨⠐⟩, ⟨⠘⟩, and ⟨⠸⟩ mark initial abbreviations, combining with the initial braille letter of a word. The italic sign ⟨⠨⟩, letter sign ⟨⠰⟩, and capital sign ⟨⠠⟩ mark final abbreviations, combining with the final letter of a sequence, commonly a suffix.

=== Initial abbreviations ===
(The combining initial letter is written here in boldface, as it does not always correspond to the initial letter of printed orthography.)

- ⟨⠐⟩ forms the words ⠐⠓ **h**ere, ⠐⠮ **the**re, ⠐⠱ **wh**ere, ⠐⠑ **e**ver, ⠐⠳ **ou**ght, ⠐⠋ **f**ather, ⠐⠍ **m**other, ⠐⠝ **n**ame, ⠐⠡ **ch**aracter, ⠐⠟ **q**uestion, ⠐⠅ **k**now, ⠐⠇ **l**ord, ⠐⠕ **o**ne, ⠐⠙ **d**ay, ⠐⠎ **s**ome, ⠐⠏ **p**art, ⠐⠞ **t**ime, ⠐⠗ **r**ight, ⠐⠹ **th**rough, ⠐⠥ **u**nder, ⠐⠺ **w**ork, ⠐⠽ **y**oung
- ⟨⠘⟩ forms the words ⠘⠮ **the**se, ⠘⠹ **th**ose, ⠘⠥ **u**pon, ⠘⠱ **wh**ose, ⠘⠺ **w**ord
- ⟨⠸⟩ forms the words ⠸⠉ **c**annot, ⠸⠍ **m**any, ⠸⠓ **h**ad, ⠸⠮ **the**ir, ⠸⠎ **s**pirit, ⠸⠺ **w**orld

In general, these are acceptable as parts of longer words as long as they retain their pronunciation. There are three main exceptions to this:

- ⟨one⟩ does not need to keep its abnormal pronunciation, as long as the o and n fall in the same syllable
- ⟨some⟩ needs to form a complete syllable, as in chromosome (ch-r-o-m-o-some)
- ⟨part⟩ cannot be used in partake or its derivatives

As can be seen from chromosome, the pronunciation requirement is rather loose. Given the difficulty of English speakers in agreeing on where syllable breaks fall, syllable requirements are also loosely construed in braille: they do not follow the rigid application of a dictionary.

=== Final abbreviations ===
- ⟨⠨⟩ forms the sequences ⠨⠙ -oun**d**, ⠨⠞ -oun**t**, ⠨⠑ -anc**e**, ⠨⠎ -les**s**, ⠨⠝ -sio**n**
- ⟨⠰⟩ forms the sequences ⠰⠛ -on**g**, ⠰⠇ -fu**l**, ⠰⠞ -men**t**, ⠰⠑ -enc**e**, ⠰⠎ -nes**s**, ⠰⠝ -tio**n**, ⠰⠽ -it**y**
- ⟨⠠⟩ Capital ⟨Y⟩ stands for the suffix ⠠⠽ -all**y**, and ⟨N⟩ for ⠠⠝ -atio**n**.

These cannot follow an apostrophe or hyphen. They cannot form independent words like *ally or *less, nor can they occur at the beginning of a word like *ancestor or *lesson. However, then can usually occur elsewhere: c-ount, ar-ound. They may be used across syllables, as in c-ance-r. ⟨ness⟩ is used for the suffix -ess after n, though not after en or in, as in baroness (b-ar-o-ness) and lioness, but not in chieftainess (ch-i-e-f-t-a-in-e-s-s).

-full does not use ⠰⠇ ⟨ful⟩ in order to preserve the parallel with the independent word full. However, -ful and -fully do.

When there are several ways to write a word, the shortest one is chosen, and when they are of equal length, the one without (two-cell) abbreviations is chosen. So, thence is written th-ence (3 cells) rather than the-n-c-e (4 cells). However, with the sequences -anced, -ancer, -enced, -encer, the form with -ance/-ence is used even if not shorter.

Braille also uses print abbreviations such as ea., Mon., Sept., etc., in which case the period ⠲ is used as in print.

== Spacing ==
A single space ⟨ ⟩ (a blank cell, which has the same width as all other cells) is left between words and sentences. Paragraphs are indented with a double space. This is universal in braille, even when transcribing a printed text that does not indent paragraphs: Blank lines are not used for this in braille, though they may be used for changes of scene, etc. As much as possible, lines continue to the right margin, with words divided and hyphenated to fit. If this would cause an illegal sequence of ligature or contraction and hyphen, the spelling needs to be decomposed, or the word hyphenated differently.

The full cell ⟨ ⟩ is used to over-type and strike out errors when using a braille writer. (Mistakes may also be erased by smoothing them out, but this runs the risk of making the corrected letter illegible.)

The full cell may also indicate a missing value in a table. It can also function more generally as a column marker to keep the data in a table aligned. For example, a row in a table of punctuation, where the columns contain symbols of different lengths, could be written,

,	;	:	.	!	( )	?	“ ”	*	/

(For an illustration of such use, see the alphabet chart in the box at Russian Braille, where a column marker sets off each letter of the alphabet and each mark of punctuation.)

== Unified English Braille ==
Unified English Braille (UEB) is an attempted unified standard for English Braille, proposed in 1991 to the Braille Authority of North America (BANA). The motivation for UEB was that the proliferation of specialized braille codes—which sometimes assigned conflicting values to even basic letters and numbers—was threatening not just braille-literacy, but also the viability of English braille itself. Also, the irregularities of English Braille made automated transcription inaccurate, and therefore increased the cost and time required to print in braille. In 1993, the UEB project was adopted by the International Council on English Braille, and expanded to cover the various national systems of the member states: Australia, Canada, New Zealand, Nigeria, South Africa, the United Kingdom, and the United States. An additional goal became adoption of a single standard for all braille encoding, apart from music; with the exception of math-notation, this was largely achieved. New Zealand officially retains Māori Braille as compatible with UEB, and BANA officially retains Nemeth Code as a math-notation option alongside UEB for the United States.

In the finalized form as of 2013, UEB upgrades English Braille Grade 2 (the literary coding used in several slightly variable forms in different countries), obsoletes Computer Braille Code by making email/website/programming syntax part of literary coding, and in some ways competes with Nemeth Code by adding additional math-notation (albeit Taylor-style with the numerals overwriting letters rather than overwriting punctuation as in Nemeth) to the literary coding. Compared to the American standard described in this article, Unified English has the following differences:

1. Readings: Several have been eliminated, due to ambiguity or translation problems: the letters dd and -ble, the contractions by, com-, to, into, and o'clock, and the capitalized abbreviations -ally and -ation.
2. Spacing: Words such as and the are to be spaced in braille just as they are in print (formerly they were typically run together as andthe)
3. Formatting: Bold, underline, and italics now have separate formatting marks (formerly it was impossible to distinguish between underlined-braille and italicized-braille). A triple capital sign now indicates a passage in all-caps.
4. Punctuation: New opening and closing parentheses ⠐⠣ and ⠐⠜ (which previously were ambiguous). Various brackets, quotation marks, dashes, and other punctuation (including notably mathematical and arithmetical notations such as the equals sign) have been added, so that printed text can be reproduced less ambiguously.
5. Uniformity: UEB is likely to become the worldwide standard for English-language braille (see full article for details)
6. Extensibility: provisions have been made for adding new symbols, without causing new conflicts
7. Miscellaneous changes: various other differences exist

The following punctuation is retained:

Traditional punctuation
,	;	:	.	!	?

The Grade 2 innter opening quotation mark is also retained, but the closing equivalent is changed.

The right-side abbreviation and formatting marks are used to derive quotation marks and mathematical symbols, by combining them with lower-half punctuation and four letters which graphically resemble ( ) / \.

New mathematical symbols and punctuation
^	~			<	>			
+	=	×, *		(	)	÷		−
	"	‘	’				—	
		“	”					
			%	[	]		`	_
#	|			{	}	/	\	

In addition, the accent mark is used to derive the following. At least the first, the ampersand, is the same as usage in American Grade-2 Braille, and at least the dollar sign is different.

Other symbols
&	@	$	¢	€	æ	œ

== Sample ==
The following text is the same in American Grade 2 and Unified English Braille:

Article 1 of the Universal Declaration of Human Rights

⠠⠁⠇⠇⠀⠓⠥⠍⠁⠝⠀⠆⠬⠎⠀⠜⠑⠀⠃⠕⠗⠝⠀⠋⠗⠑⠑⠀⠯⠀⠑⠟⠥⠁⠇⠀⠔⠀⠙⠊⠛⠝⠰⠽⠀⠯⠀⠐⠗⠎⠲
⠠⠮⠽⠀⠜⠑⠀⠢⠙⠪⠫⠀⠾⠀⠗⠂⠎⠕⠝⠀⠯⠀⠒⠎⠉⠊⠰⠑⠀⠯⠀⠩⠙⠀⠁⠉⠞⠀⠞⠪⠜⠙⠎⠀⠐⠕⠀⠁⠝⠕⠤
⠮⠗⠀⠔⠀⠁⠀⠸⠎⠀⠷⠀⠃⠗⠕⠮⠗⠓⠕⠕⠙⠲

All human beings are born free and equal in dignity and rights.
They are endowed with reason and conscience and should act towards one ano-
ther in a spirit of brotherhood.

⠠⠁⠇⠇	⠓⠥⠍⠁⠝	⠆⠬⠎	⠜⠑	⠃⠕⠗⠝	⠋⠗⠑⠑	⠯	⠑⠟⠥⠁⠇	⠔	⠙⠊⠛⠝⠰⠽	⠯	⠐⠗⠎⠲
All	human	beings	are	born	free	and	equal	in	dignity	and	rights.

⠠⠮⠽	⠜⠑	⠢⠙⠪⠫	⠾	⠗⠂⠎⠕⠝	⠯	⠒⠎⠉⠊⠰⠑	⠯	⠩⠙	⠁⠉⠞	⠞⠪⠜⠙⠎	⠐⠕	⠁⠝⠕⠤
They	are	endowed	with	reason	and	conscience	and	should	act	towards	one	ano-

⠮⠗	⠔	⠁	⠸⠎	⠷	⠃⠗⠕⠮⠗⠓⠕⠕⠙⠲
ther	in	a	spirit	of	brotherhood.

== See also ==
- Braille Challenge
- Braille Institute of America
- National Braille Association
- Unified English Braille
- Nemeth Braille
- Gardner–Salinas braille codes
