= Abraham Nemeth =

American mathematician (1918–2013)

- Born: October 16, 1918; New York City
- Died: October 2, 2013 (aged 94)
- Education: Columbia University (MA); Wayne State University (PhD)
- Occupations: Mathematician, professor of mathematics
- Employer: University of Detroit Mercy

Abraham Nemeth (October 16, 1918 – October 2, 2013) was an American mathematician. He was a professor of mathematics at the University of Detroit Mercy in Detroit, Michigan. Nemeth was blind and is known for developing Nemeth Braille, a system for blind people to read and write mathematics.

== Early/Personal life ==
Nemeth was born in New York City on the Lower East Side of Manhattan into a large family of Hungarian Jewish immigrants who spoke Yiddish. He was born blind. The disability emerged from a combination of macular degeneration and retinitis pigmentosa.

He attended public schools at first but did most of his primary and secondary education at the Jewish Guild for the Blind school in Yonkers, New York. His undergraduate studies were at Brooklyn College where he studied psychology. He earned a Master of Arts degree in psychology from Columbia University.

Nemeth studied mathematics and physics at Brooklyn College. He did not major in mathematics because his academic advisors discouraged him. However, tired of what he felt were unfulfilling jobs at agencies of the blind, and with the encouragement of his first wife Florence, he decided to continue his education in mathematics. He received a Ph.D. in mathematics from Wayne State University.

In 1970, Dr. Nemeth married Mrs. Edna Lazar, widow of Professor Nicholas Lazar. Dr. & Mrs. Nemeth resided near the University of Detroit, so he could walk to work. They later resided in Oak Park, Michigan. Edna Nemeth's eight grandchildrens and one step-granddaughter grew up endeared to their beloved "Grandpa Abe", who was always quick with a joke, song or funny animal noises. He has sixteen great-grandchildren. Edna and Abraham were married until her death at age 90 in 2000. When Abraham died in 2013 he was buried next to her, in a Jewish cemetery in suburban Detroit.

== Academic career ==
Nemeth taught part-time at various colleges in New York. Though his employers were sometimes reluctant to hire him knowing that he was blind, his reputation grew as it became apparent that he was a capable mathematician and teacher. Nemeth distinguished himself from many other blind people by being able to write visual print letters and mathematical symbols on paper and blackboards just like sighted people, a skill he learned as a child. Nemeth says that this skill allowed him to succeed in mathematics, during an era without much technology, when even Braille was difficult to use in mathematics. During the 1950s he moved to Detroit, Michigan to accept a position at the University of Detroit working with Keith Rosenberg. He remained there for 30 years, retiring in 1985. During the late 1960s he studied computer science and began the university's program in that subject.

== Importance to mathematics and blindness ==
As the coursework became more advanced, he found that he needed a braille code that would more effectively handle the kinds of math and science material he was tackling. Ultimately, he developed the Nemeth Braille Code for Mathematics and Science Notation, which was published in 1952. The Nemeth Code has gone through 4 revisions since its initial development, and continues to be widely used today.

Nemeth is also responsible for the rules of MathSpeak, a system for orally communicating mathematical text. In the course of his studies, Nemeth found that he needed to make use of sighted readers to read otherwise inaccessible math texts and other materials. Likewise, he needed a method for dictating his math work and other materials for transcription into print. The conventions Nemeth developed for efficiently reading mathematical text out loud have evolved into MathSpeak.

Nemeth was instrumental in the development of Unified English Braille (UEB) from 1991 to at least 2001, though he eventually parted ways with others developing that code, and instead worked on a parallel effort called the Universal Braille System (sometimes abbreviated as NUBS with his name appended to the front). As of 2012, UEB was officially adopted by BANA as the standard for literary braille, but Nemeth Code was also fully retained as an optional official coding system. Work on NUBS may continue, or it might be merged into a future rules-update to the official Nemeth Code (the most recent official rules-update to Nemeth Code was in 2013).

== Post-retirement ==
Nemeth was still working on the Nemeth code when he died. Nemeth had been active in the Jewish community since childhood, and since his retirement from academic mathematics he had been transcribing Hebrew prayer books into Braille.

Nemeth was an active member of the National Federation of the Blind. He has written several short stories and made speeches for the NFB about his life as a blind mathematician. On February 11, 2006, Nemeth had a heart attack, but recovered and he was well to attend the July 2006 NFB convention and accept the 2006 Louis Braille award which the organization gave him. On July 9, 2009, he was honored by the NFB as a co-recipient of the Dr. Jacob Bolotin award.

== Trivia ==
Nemeth was a member of the United States Democratic Party but was appointed by a Republican governor of Michigan as chairman of the state commission for the blind, a position in which he served for two years, though he said that he did not like politics.

Nemeth was a pianist who loved entertaining others. He was also known for having a retentive memory and the ability to match a story or joke to almost any subject or occasion.

== See also ==
- Jewish Braille Institute
- Jewish Heritage for the Blind
