= Valerie Capers =

African-American pianist and composer

- Born: May 24, 1935 (age 91); New York City, New York, U.S.
- Genre: Jazz
- Occupations: Musician, composer, educator
- Instrument: Piano
- Labels: Atlantic, KMArts, Columbia
- Website: www.valcapmusic.com

Valerie Capers (born May 24, 1935) is an American pianist and composer who is best known for her contributions in jazz.

== Early life ==
Capers was born in New York City to a musical family that introduced her to classical and jazz music. Her father was a professional jazz pianist who was friends with Fats Waller, and her brother Bobby later played tenor sax and flute with Mongo Santamaria's Afro-Cuban band.

Capers has been blind since the age of six, when an illness deprived her of her sight. Her early schooling took place at the New York Institute for the Education of the Blind, where she studied classical piano with Elizabeth Thode. Thode taught Capers to read Braille music notation; Capers had to learn all of her pieces by memorizing them in Braille before playing them. With Thorpe's encouragement, Capers continued to study at the Juilliard School of Music, where she obtained her bachelor's and master's degrees. She was the first blind graduate of the Juilliard School.

== Career ==
Upon graduating from Juilliard in 1960, Capers was encouraged by her brother Bobby to study jazz. Bobby was also an impetus for Capers to start composing, as he asked her to compose pieces for his band. Capers took time off from playing classical music in the early 1960s in order to learn jazz. Capers formed her own trio and in 1966 recorded her first jazz album, Portrait in Soul.

Capers found it difficult to find teaching jobs in the 1960s because many institutions were unwilling to hire a blind person. She eventually was hired at the Bronx Neighborhood Music School and the Brooklyn School of Music. From 1968 to 1975 she worked at the Manhattan School of Music, where she was an advisor to blind students and developed a jazz curriculum. Capers was the chair of the Bronx Community College music department from 1987 to 1995.

Following her brother Bobby's death in 1974, Capers composed the two hour Christmas cantata Sing About Love, which adheres to no particular genre but incorporates elements from jazz, gospel, blues, and classical. Other significant works by Capers include Song of the Seasons, a song cycle largely composed in the classical idiom, and Sojourner, an "operatorio" (a combination of opera and oratorio, term coined by Capers) about the life of Sojourner Truth.

In 2000, Oxford University Press (OUP) published a book of Capers's intermediate jazz piano compositions entitled Portraits in Jazz. Capers composed these pieces so that piano students who were being trained classically could be exposed to jazz.

== Discography ==
Year recorded	Title	Label	Notes
1966	Portrait in Soul	Atlantic	With John Daley (bass), Charley Hawkins (drums), Vincent McEwen (trumpet), Robin Kenyatta (alto sax), Frank Perowsky (tenor sax), Richy Landrum (congas)
1982	Affirmation	KMArts	With John Robinson (bass ), Al Harewood (drums)
1995	Come On Home	Columbia	With John Robinson, Bob Cranshaw (bass), Terry Clarke (drums), Wynton Marsalis (trumpet), Paquito D'Rivera (alto sax), Mongo Santamaria (congas)
1999	Wagner Takes the "A" Train	Elysium	With John Robinson (bass), Earl Williams (drums), Alan Givens (tenor sax, soprano sax, flute), Mark Marino (guitar)
2001	Limited Edition	Valcap	With John Robinson (bass), Earl Williams, Al Harewood (drums), Alan Givens (tenor sax, soprano sax, flute), Mark Marino (guitar)
