= Computer Braille Code =

Braille for representation of computer-related materials

1	4
2	5
3	6
7	8

Standard numbering of dots in 8-dot Braille patterns.

Computer Braille is an adaptation of braille for precise representation of computer-related materials such as programs, program lines, computer commands, and filenames. Unlike standard 6-dot braille scripts, but like Gardner–Salinas braille codes, this may employ the extended 8-dot braille patterns.

There are two standards of representation of computer code with braille:

1) The Computer Braille Code as defined by the Braille Authority of North America. However, since January 2016 it is no longer official in the US and replaced by Unified English Braille (UEB). It employs only the 6-dot braille patterns to represent all printing code points of ASCII. It is virtually identical to Braille ASCII, a system of representation of braille with ASCII characters, which goal is mirrored to the Computer Braille Code. To represent ASCII code points 0x60, 0x7B, 0x7C, 0x7D, 0x7E as well as capital letters the 4-5-6 (⠸) character is used as the shift indicator or modifier. Thus, ` (grave accent, 0x60) is represented by ⠸⠈, where ⠈ is assigned to @ (at sign, 0x40). In other words, ⠸ either adds (for punctuation) or subtracts (for letters) 32 to or from the ASCII value of the following character. Unlike Braille ASCII _ (underscore, 0x5F) is represented by ⠸⠸.

Computer Braille Code
	0	1	2	3	4	5	6	7	8	9	A	B	C	D	E	F
2_	⠀ SP	⠮ !	⠐ "	⠼ #	⠫ $	⠩ %	⠯ &	⠄ '	⠷ (	⠾)	⠡ *	⠬ +	⠠,	⠤ -	⠨.	⠌ /
3_	⠴ 0	⠂ 1	⠆ 2	⠒ 3	⠲ 4	⠢ 5	⠖ 6	⠶ 7	⠦ 8	⠔ 9	⠱ :	⠰;	⠣ <	⠿ =	⠜ >	⠹ ?
4_	⠈ @	⠸⠁ A	⠸⠃ B	⠸⠉ C	⠸⠙ D	⠸⠑ E	⠸⠋ F	⠸⠛ G	⠸⠓ H	⠸⠊ I	⠸⠚ J	⠸⠅ K	⠸⠇ L	⠸⠍ M	⠸⠝ N	⠸⠕ O
5_	⠸⠏ P	⠸⠟ Q	⠸⠗ R	⠸⠎ S	⠸⠞ T	⠸⠥ U	⠸⠧ V	⠸⠺ W	⠸⠭ X	⠸⠽ Y	⠸⠵ Z	⠪ [	⠳ \	⠻ ]	⠘	⠸⠸ _
6_	⠸⠈ `	⠁ a	⠃ b	⠉ c	⠙ d	⠑ e	⠋ f	⠛ g	⠓ h	⠊ i	⠚ j	⠅ k	⠇ l	⠍ m	⠝ n	⠕ o
7_	⠏ p	⠟ q	⠗ r	⠎ s	⠞ t	⠥ u	⠧ v	⠺ w	⠭ x	⠽ y	⠵ z	⠸⠪ {	⠸⠳ |	⠸⠻ }	⠸⠘ ~	⠀ ⌂

2) The Braille Computer Notation (BCN) as defined by the Braille Authority of the United Kingdom. It uses 8-dot patterns to represent 256 different values so arbitrary byte data can be written in Braille.

The BCN 8-dot code is assigned by the following rules:

- Latin small letters and space are represented in the 6-dot subset by the same patterns from the international Braille code.
- Latin capital letters don't need the "capital prefix" pattern from international Braille; instead the extended Braille dot 7 is composed below the international Braille patterns for Latin letters (as shown in rows 4 and 5 compared to rows 6 and 7 of the table below).
- Digits don't need the "number prefix" dot pattern from the international Braille; digits 1 to 9 are represented by the international Braille 6-dot code patterns but with their dots moved up one row, and Braille dot 6 is set; digit 0 sets all dots 1 to 6.
- Basic ASCII punctuations and symbols (in ranges 0x21 to 0x2F and from 0x3A to 0x3F) are rearranged using the remaining 6-dot patterns not used by digits and Latin capital letters (as shown in rows 2 and 3 of the table below).
- The remaining ASCII punctuations and symbols (in ranges 0x40, 0x5B to 0x60, and 0x7B to 0x7F) are rearranged using the remaining 7-dot patterns not used by basic ASCII punctuation, digits and Latin letters.
- C0 controls (or symbols from legacy OEM code page 437) are composed with Braille dot 7, which subtracts 32 from the ASCII value (as shown in rows 0 and 1 compared to rows 2 and 3 of the table below).
- The composition of Braille dot 8 adds 128 to the ASCII value (not shown in the table below, it is used for extensions for 8-bit codes of ASCII-based encodings, including single-byte encodings like ISO/IEC 8859 and other legacy Windows and OEM codepages, or multibyte encodings like Unicode UTF-8). The following table (which shows only the 7-bit part) assumes the 8-bit data is encoding text in the legacy DOS/OEM CP437 character set used on the IBM PC.

Braille Computer Notation
	0	1	2	3	4	5	6	7	8	9	A	B	C	D	E	F
0_	⡀ NUL	⡼ ☺	⡈ ☻	⡰ ♥	⡸ ♦	⡨ ♣	⡯ ♠	⡄ •	⡘ ◘	⡜ ○	⡔ ◙	⡖ ♂	⡂ ♀	⡤ ♪	⡲ ♫	⡌ ☼
1_	⡿ ►	⡡ ◄	⡣ ↕	⡩ ‼	⡹ ¶	⡱ §	⡫ ▬	⡻ ↨	⡳ ↑	⡪ ↓	⡒ →	⡆ ←	⡦ ∟	⡶ ↔	⡴ ▲	⡢ ▼
2_	⠀ SP	⠼ !	⠈ "	⠰ #	⠸ $	⠨ %	⠯ &	⠄ '	⠘ (	⠜)	⠔ *	⠖ +	⠂,	⠤ -	⠲.	⠌ /
3_	⠿ 0	⠡ 1	⠣ 2	⠩ 3	⠹ 4	⠱ 5	⠫ 6	⠻ 7	⠳ 8	⠪ 9	⠒ :	⠆;	⠦ <	⠶ =	⠴ >	⠢ ?
4_	⡮ @	⡁ A	⡃ B	⡉ C	⡙ D	⡑ E	⡋ F	⡛ G	⡓ H	⡊ I	⡚ J	⡅ K	⡇ L	⡍ M	⡝ N	⡕ O
5_	⡏ P	⡟ Q	⡗ R	⡎ S	⡞ T	⡥ U	⡧ V	⡺ W	⡭ X	⡽ Y	⡵ Z	⡷ [	⡐ \	⡾ ]	⡠	⡬ _
6_	⠮ `	⠁ a	⠃ b	⠉ c	⠙ d	⠑ e	⠋ f	⠛ g	⠓ h	⠊ i	⠚ j	⠅ k	⠇ l	⠍ m	⠝ n	⠕ o
7_	⠏ p	⠟ q	⠗ r	⠎ s	⠞ t	⠥ u	⠧ v	⠺ w	⠭ x	⠽ y	⠵ z	⠷ {	⠐ |	⠾ }	⠠ ~	⠬ ⌂
