= William Bell Wait =

American educationalist (1839–1916)

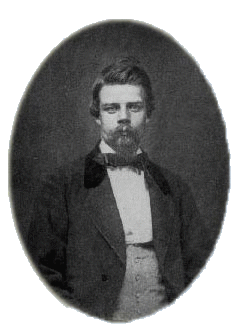
- Born: March 25, 1839; Amsterdam, New York
- Died: October 25, 1916 (aged 77); New York, New York
- Education: The Albany Academy
- Spouse: Phoebe Jane Babcock M.D. (m. 1863)

William Bell Wait (New York Point:; 1839–1916) was a teacher in the New York Institute for the Education of the Blind who invented New York Point, a system of writing for the blind that was adopted widely in the United States before the braille system was universally adopted there. Wait also applied the New York Point principles to adapt them for use in over 20 languages, created a form of New York Point to notate music, and invented a number of devices to better type and print embossed material for the visually impaired.

== Early life and education ==
William Bell Wait was born in Amsterdam, New York on March 25, 1839. He grew up in New York and attended the Albany Academy and later the Albany Normal College in 1859. Subsequent to graduating he obtained a teaching position at the New York Institute for the Education of the Blind, where he spent two years. He then went on to study under Tremain and Peckham in Albany. He was called to the bar in 1862.

He married Phoebe Jane Babcock on October 27, 1863, and they had seven children.

He was acting first superintendent of the City of Kingston, N.Y. school district in 1863. In October 1863 he was appointed Principal of the New York Institute for the Education of the Blind. He served in this capacity until March 1905. He was subsequently appointed Emeritus Principal, and served until his death, which took place at his home in New York City on October 25, 1916.

== Inventions ==
=== New York Point System ===
Wait developed a keen interested in raised letters and tried to devise a tangible printing and writing system. He later developed the New York Point System in which points were used to represent letters or their sound. This system contained "twenty-six capitals, twenty-six small letters, numerals, punctuation marks and short forms for diphthongs, triphthongs, syllables and for words and parts of words in common use." He was awarded medals at the Chilean Exposition and International Exposition in 1873 for these accomplishments. Before his death Wait oversaw the adaptation of his point system to more than twenty different languages, including Hebrew, Arabic, Japanese and Chinese.

=== Other inventions ===
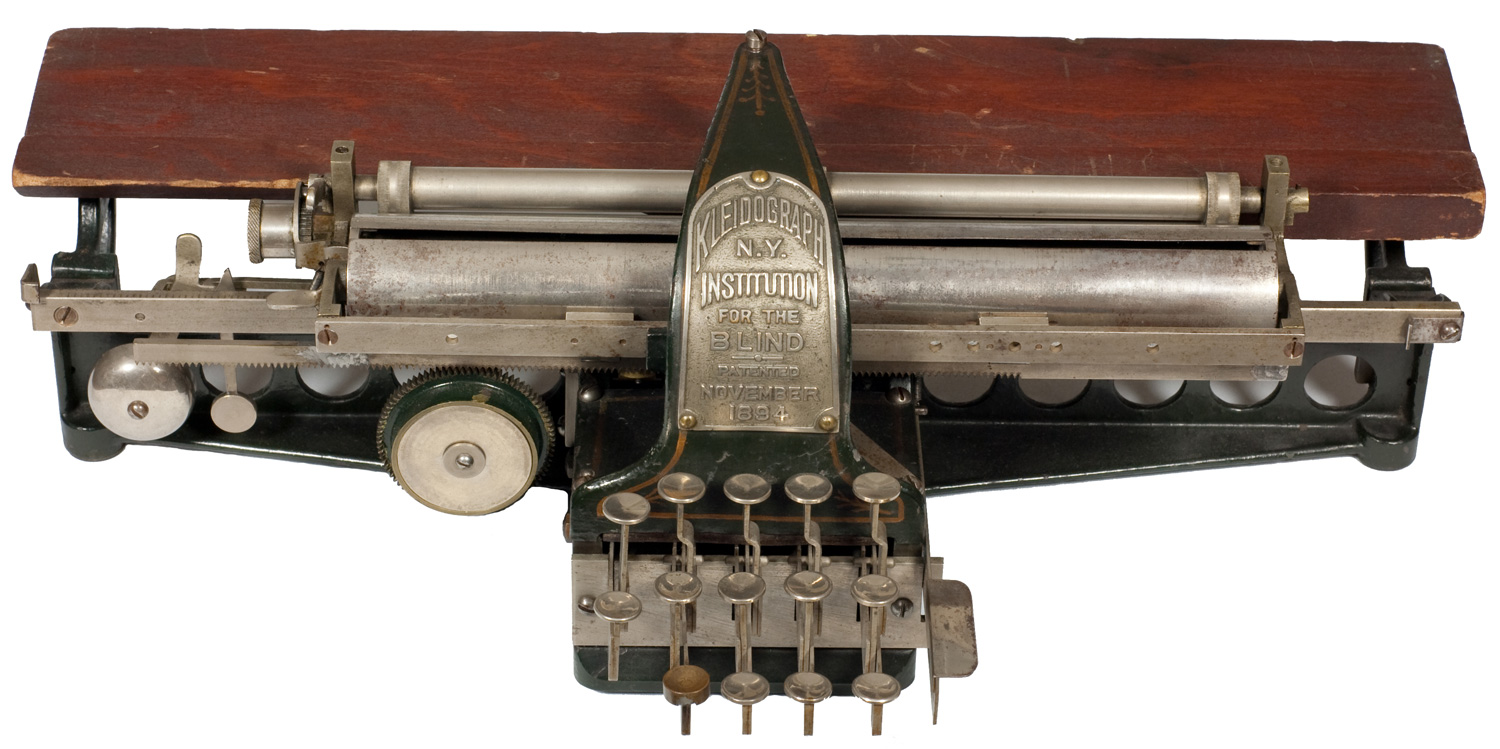
Kleidograph, 1894

He followed his inventions with a tangible musical notation system in 1872. He completed the Kleidograph in 1894. This machine is much like a typewriter which could be used for embossing the raised letters of the New York Point system unto paper. He invented the Stereograph. This machine was used for metal plate embossing, to facilitate bulk printing of books for the visually impaired. He received the John Scott most deserving Medal from the Franklin Institute of Philadelphia in 1900 for his inventions. He later developed a printing press which used a breakthrough process which allowed for embossing on dual sides of a book page. He also formulated more economic and durable methods of book binding, reducing the long-term costs of printing.

== Other accomplishments ==
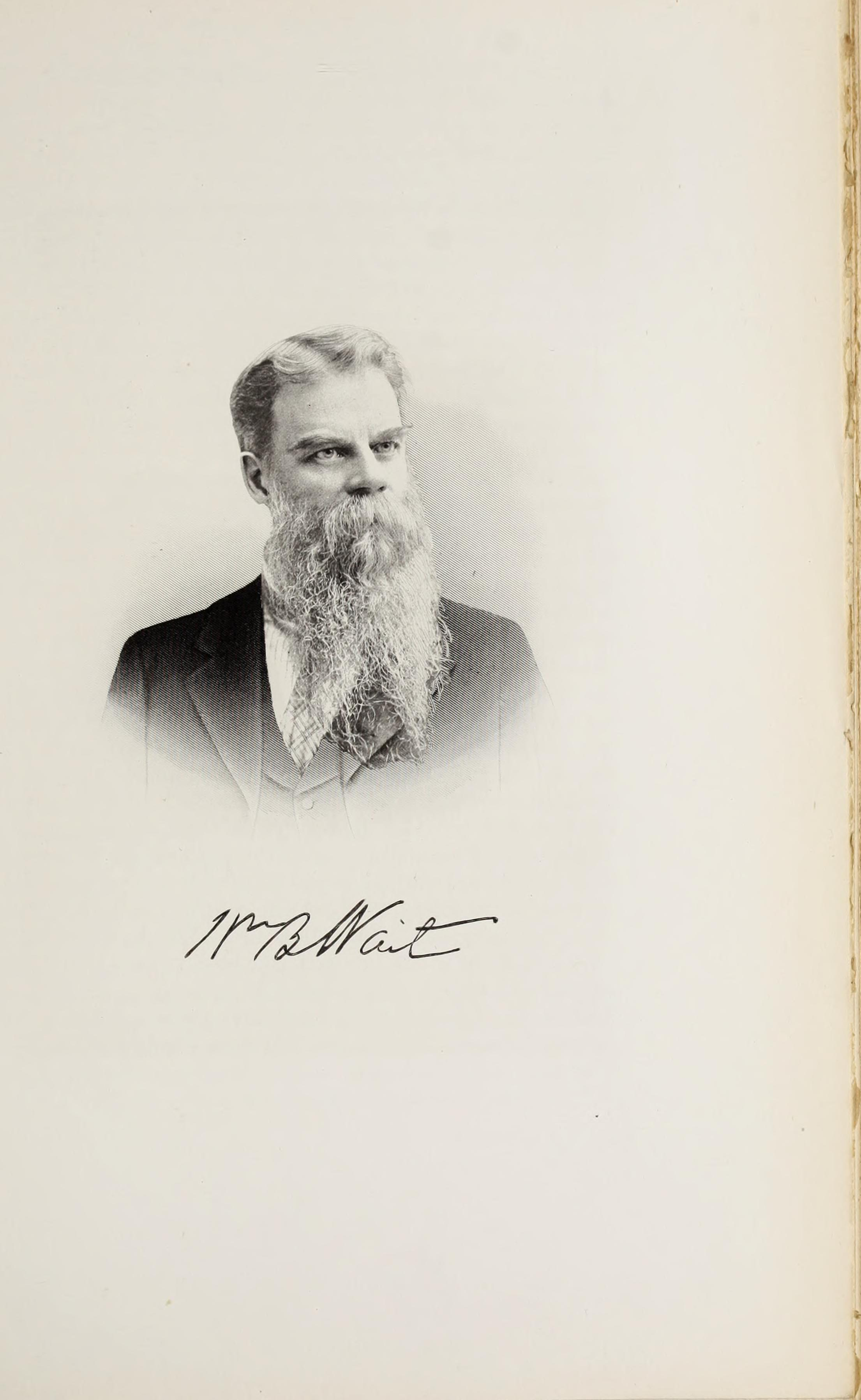
William Bell Wait (c. 1900)

William B. Wait founded the following organizations:

- American Association of Instructors of the Blind (1871)
- Society for providing Evangelical Religious Literature for the Blind (1874)

== Publications ==
William B. Wait wrote the following books:

- The Normal Course of Piano Technique (1887)
- Harmonic Notation (1888)
- Phases of Punctography in Relation to Visual Typography, writing, printing, bookbinding, and other features (1900)
- The Uniform Type Question: An examination of the report of the Uniform Type Committee of June, 1913 (1915)
- New Aspects of the Uniform Type Folly (1916)

== See also ==
- Blindness and education
- Braille
- Braille music
- Perkins Brailler
