= Effie Lee Morris =

American librarian

- Morris in 1970
- Born: April 20, 1921; Richmond, Virginia, US
- Died: November 9, 2009 (aged 88); San Francisco, California, US
- Education: University of Chicago; Western Reserve University (BA, BLS, MLIS)
- Occupation: Children's librarian
- Known for: Library services and advocacy for children, minorities, and the visually impaired

Effie Lee Morris (April 20, 1921 – November 9, 2009) was an African American children's librarian, educator, and activist, best known for her pioneering public library services for minorities and the visually-impaired. Morris developed Cleveland Public Library's first Negro History Week and was New York Public Library's first children's specialist for visually-impaired patrons. She was the first coordinator of children's services at San Francisco Public Library, where she was also the first African American to hold an administrative position.

An active leader in advocacy organizations, Morris served as president of the Public Library Association—the first woman and first African American person to do so. Morris also served on the committees for prominent children's book awards, including the Caldecott Medal, Newbery Medal, and Laura Ingalls Wilder Medal (now known as the Children's Literature Legacy Award). Morris wrote the original selection criteria for the Coretta Scott King Award to become an official award for the American Library Association (ALA) in 1982.

Morris received many distinguished awards during her lifetime and posthumously. The ALA conferred their highest honor, honorary membership, on Morris in 2008. In 2017, she was inducted posthumously into the California Library Association's Hall of Fame.

== Education and personal life ==
Morris grew up in segregated Richmond, Virginia. At the age of eight, she moved with her family to Cleveland, Ohio, where her father was head chef with the Chesapeake and Ohio Railway. Morris and her sister were among only a few African-Ameirican students at their elementary school in Cleveland. Reading was a part of Morris's life from an early age. After discovering her local Mount Pleasant branch of the Cleveland Public Library, she delighted in playing librarian by organizing her books on the front porch.

Morris was valedictorian at John Adams High School and won a scholarship to the University of Chicago, where she studied for three years. She returned home to Cleveland after her father fell ill and finished her undergraduate career at Western Reserve University (now called Case Western Reserve University), from which she received two bachelor's degrees: one in Social Sciences, and another in Library Science. She studied under Harriet Long, who specialized in training children's librarians. Morris returned to Case Western for graduate school, earning her Master of Science in Library Science in 1956. Her thesis was titled "A Mid-Century Survey of the Presentation of the American Negro in Literature for Children Published in the United States between 1700 and 1950."

Morris married Leonard Virgil Jones in Honolulu, Hawai’i on August 25, 1971. At the time of their marriage, Jones was Assistant Vice President of Fidelity Savings and Loan Association. A graduate of University of California, Berkeley, Jones played football for coach Pappy Waldorf. Jones remained active at Berkeley, serving as a trustee of the Cal Athletic Foundation and a director of the Cal Alumni Association.

Morris always wore a pendant of an owl, which was her personal symbol of excellence and a reference to The Three Owls column written by New York Public Library children's librarian Anne Carroll Moore. The column was the first series of children's book reviews to be published by the New York Herald Tribune. Moore's three owls represent the author, illustrator, and critic; Moore's fourth owl represents the reader.

== Career ==
=== Cleveland Public Library (1945–1955) ===
Morris's library career began during college at the Cleveland Public Library, where she worked in a branch serving a majority African American community. She focused on literacy for African American children and children in low-income urban areas. She established the library's first Negro History Week celebration for children, for which she developed the programming and suggested reading list.

=== New York Public Library (1955–1963) ===
In 1955, New York Public Library recruited Morris away from Cleveland. She worked in The Bronx and became the library's first children's specialist for visually-impaired patrons. The coordinator of children's services, Francis Landis Spane, allocated grant money for Morris to find materials for visually-impaired children. Morris was the only librarian in the country working with blind children and advocated for new books to be written for this population. When blind children throughout the country wrote to her for books, Morris worked with the National Braille Association (then known as the National Braille Club) to secure new adaptations of children's books. This included braille editions as well as multi-sensory adaptations using fabrics as illustrations. During her time in New York, Morris served as president of the National Braille Association and chair of the Library of Congress's Committee for Book Selection for Blind Children.

=== San Francisco Public Library (1963–1977) ===
Morris moved from New York to San Francisco in 1963 to become the first children's services coordinator at San Francisco Public Library. She was also the first African American to hold an administrative position at the library. By 1973, she was still only one of ten African American librarians working in the San Francisco Public Library system.

In 1964, Morris established the library's Children's Historical and Research Collection, featuring out-of-print books for young people that depicted ethnic stereotypes, in order to highlight the changing portrayals of ethnic and minority groups. The collection was renamed in Morris's honor in 1981. In 1969, Morris helped establish the library's first African-American History program, which included a visit by five African American authors and illustrators, including author Lorenz Graham.

A consummate advocate for children, Morris once advised the library's architects that the proposed railings in the children's section were dangerous for children, as they had been set too wide. During her fourteen-year tenure, Morris wrote the library's declaration of children's rights, translated the library's card application into five languages, established a city-wide summer reading program, and wrote booklists for the annual event. In 1975, Morris used a Library Services and Construction Act grant to establish "Dial-a-Story", a 24-hour phone line where callers could listen to a three-minute recorded story for preschool-aged children.

=== Public Library Association presidency (1971–1972) ===
From 1971 to 1972 Morris was the first African American and first woman to serve as president of the Public Library Association.

=== Post-library career ===
After leaving San Francisco Public Library, Morris worked as a senior editor of urban education at Harcourt Brace Jovanovich from 1978 to 1979.

After her retirement, she taught courses on children's literature the University of San Francisco, Mills College, Case Western Reserve University, and Clark Atlanta University.

In 2004, Morris delivered the commencement address to graduates of the UCLA School of Library and Information Science.

== Leadership and advocacy ==
- 1950s–60s: Chair, Library of Congress Committee for Book Selection for Blind Children
- 1950s–60s: Founding Member, Laura Ingalls Wilder Award (now called the Children's Literature Legacy Award)
- 1952, 1953, 1955, 1987: Member, Caldecott Award Committee
- 1952, 1953, 1966, 1967: Member, Newbery Award Committee
- 1961–1963: President, National Braille Association
- 1968: Founder of the San Francisco Chapter of the Women's National Book Association
- 1971–72: President, Public Library Association: Morris was the first African American and first woman to serve as president.
- 1971–84: Member, Coretta Scott King Book Awards Task Force: Morris was an early supporter of the Coretta Scott King Award, which was conceived of to complement the Caldecott and Newbery Medals by honoring minority authors and illustrators. She was a member of the selection committee from the awards' second year (1971), prior to its becoming an official American Library Association (ALA) award in 1982. In 1980, the Coretta Scott King Award committee merged with the ALA's Social Responsibilities Round Table (SRRT). Morris served as chair of the Coretta Scott King Book Awards Task Force from 1981 to 1984. During this time, she wrote the selection criteria for the award to become an official award of the ALA.
- 1974: Co-Chair, California Librarians Black Caucus
- In 1981, Morris appeared in front of the United States House of Representatives to testify in support of continuing the Library Services and Construction Act.
- 1982–84: Member, California State Library Board
- 1983: Advisory Board, Center for the Book of the Library of Congress
- Lifetime member, San Francisco African American Historical and Cultural Society

== Awards and honors ==
- 1957: Dutton-John MacRae Award honoring children's services at the library
- 1973: Iota Phi Lambda sorority's Lola M. Parker Achievement Award
- 1981: San Francisco Public Library renames the Children's Historical and Research Collection in Morris's honor. It has since been known as the Effie Lee Morris Historical and Research Collection. Bookplates in the collection include the image of an owl.
- 1984: Women's National Book Association Award
- June 12, 1984: Mayor Dianne Feinstein declares Effie Lee Morris Day in the city of San Francisco
- 1992: ALA Grolier Foundation Award for Lifetime Achievement for services to children and young people.
- 1996: The San Francisco Chapter of the Women's National Book Association established the Effie Lee Morris Lecture Series at the San Francisco Public Library. The annual event honors a children's author or illustrator "whose work exemplifies the causes she championed: inclusivity, diversity, and the rights of all children to read, learn, and create." In Fall 2019, the WNBA hosted two lecturers: authors Renée Watson and Isabel Campoy.
- 1999: Black Caucus of the American Library Association (BCALA) Legacy Award
- 1999: Blue Shield of California Ageless Heroes Joy of Learning Award Award
- 1999: Reading the World Award from the Center for Multicultural Literature for Children and Young Adults at University of San Francisco
- 2000: Honoree, California Legislature Black History Tribute to African Americans
- October 2005: Oral history participant, The HistoryMakers, a collection of video oral histories of African Americans
- 2005: Black Caucus of the American Library Association Trailblazer Award
- 2008: American Library Association Honorary Membership

=== Posthumous tributes ===
- June 2010: Tribute read into the United States congressional record by Speaker of the House Nancy Pelosi. Speaker Pelosi recognized Morris's role in advocating for public library services for children.
- 2010: Silver SPUR Award from the San Francisco Bay Area Planning and Urban Research Association, for lifetime civic achievement for the City of San Francisco
- 2012: Effie Lee Morris Collection of African American Books at the Butler Children's Literature Center at Dominican University in California. Bequeathed in 2012, the collection includes books for children that focus on the African American experience, related professional resources, and hundreds of Morris's owl figurines.
- 2017, Inductee, California Library Association's Hall of Fame

== Bibliography ==
- See the City! (1967), an adaptation of Czech illustrator Miroslav Šašek's This is San Francisco, written for 1967 ALA Conference, which took place in San Francisco.
- Annotated bibliography (1984) for the children's book Someone Special, Just Like You, which was written to inspire tolerance of preschool-aged children with disabilities.
- Foreword (2000) for the revised edition of Lorenz Graham's How God Fix Jonah, a collection of biblical stories told in the West African storytelling tradition.

== Quotes ==
- "[T]he most important thing is that children continue to read. The opportunity to make their own decisions about what they read can lead to a new awareness of the role of reading in their lives."
- "For centuries, our African American heritage has been shared through the oral tradition and then increasingly through growing amounts of print and nonprint materials. Now, technological changes are affecting the development and provision of informational resources. Librarians play a major role and should be leaders in providing continuing access to the African American identity with careful preservation of materials and with challenging guidance to all users."
