= NYP =

NYP can refer to:

- New York Philharmonic, a symphony orchestra in New York City
- New York Post, a newspaper
- New York Penn Station, a railroad station
- New York Point, an outdated method of writing for blind people
- Nanyang Polytechnic, a polytechnic in Ang Mo Kio, Singapore
- NewYork-Presbyterian Hospital, a hospital in New York City
- North Yorkshire Police, a police force in England
