= National Baseball Association =

National Baseball Association may refer to:

- National Baseball Association (circa 1933), established in England by Sir John Moores—see Baseball in the United Kingdom
- National Association of Base Ball Players (1857–1870), the governing body of early high-level but officially non-professional baseball
- National Association of Professional Base Ball Players (1871–1875), regarded by baseball historians as the first professional baseball league
- National Association (1879–1880), successor to the International Association after it lost its final Canadian team
- National Association of Professional Baseball Leagues, the former name of the governing body of Minor League Baseball, established in 1901

See also

- NBA (disambiguation)
