= Phoebe Jane Babcock Wait =

American physician (1838–1904)

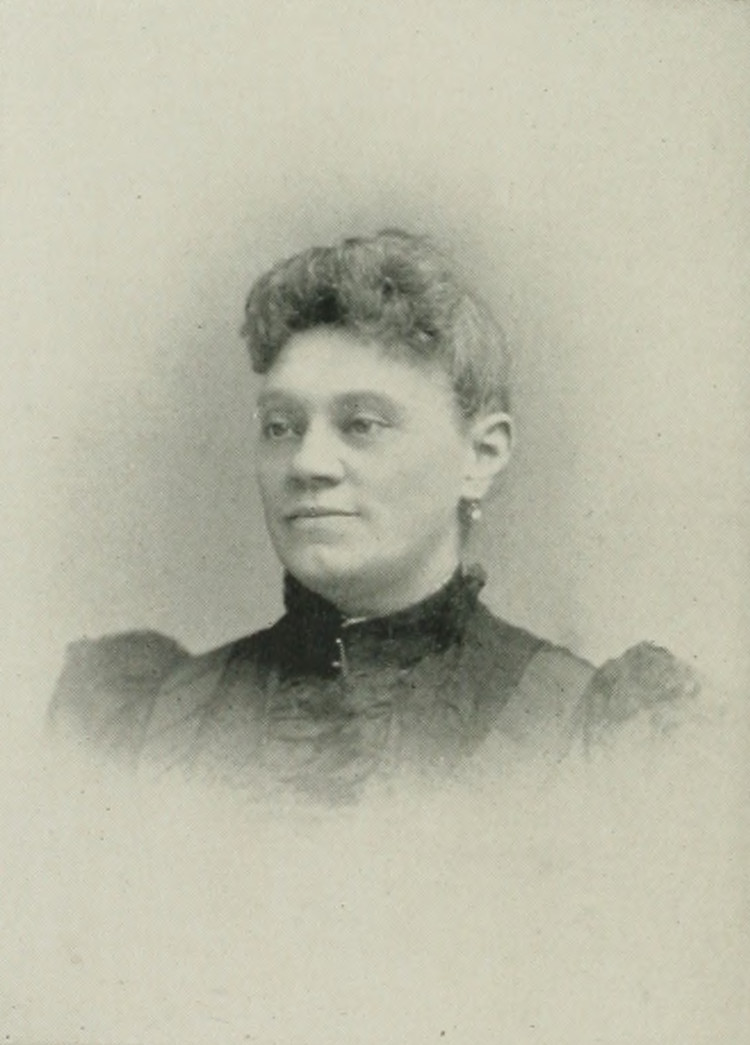
Phoebe Jane Babcock Wait, A woman of the century

Phoebe Jane Babcock Wait (September 30, 1838 – January 30, 1904) was an American physician.

== Early life ==
Phoebe Jane Babcock Wait was born in Westerly, Rhode Island, on September 30, 1838. She was one of a family of eight daughters and three sons.

== Career ==
Her early education was acquired in the district school, and after teaching for two years she entered Alfred University, Alfred (village), New York, and received the degree of A. B.

She was afterwards a teacher in the Institute for the Blind in New York City. She spent her married life at the Institute, but her influence flowed outward into wider channels. Recognizing the need of a broader and more practical education for women, in 1868 she entered the New York Medical College and Hospital for Women, in New York City.

In 1871 she received the degree of M D. In 1869 Alfred University conferred upon her the degree of A. M., recognizing her merit. Wait rendered valuable service in church work and for ten years she was president of the Dorcas Society of her local church and she was one of the managers of the Baptist Home for the Aged.

She was a member of the national and county medical societies, showing in her essays on medical and kindred topics ability and originality in step with medical progress. In 1879 she received the diploma of the New York Ophthalmic Hospital and College.

In 1880 she was elected to the chair of obstetrics in the New York Medical College and Hospital for Women. In that special line of medical work she was best known, and in it she showed exceptional skill and ability. In 1883 she was made chairman of the hospital staff, which position she held uninterruptedly for many years. Upon the death of Clemence Sophia Harned Lozier, the founder and dean of the college, Wait was elected by the faculty to the vacant office. The value of her work for women increased with her years of service.

She was a leading member of a number of societies having in view humanitarian objects. She was secretary of the Society for Promoting the Welfare of the Insane, and was also a member of the consulting staff of the Brooklyn Woman's Homeopathic Hospital.

She was a member of the New York County Homeopathic Medical Society, the American Institute of Homoepathy, the Woman's Christian Temperance Union, Phalo, Sorosis and other clubs.

== Personal life ==
In 1863 Phoebe Jane Babcock Wait became the wife of William Bell Wait, the superintendent of the Institute for the Blind in New York City.

She was the mother of seven children, of whom four daughters died young. Surviving children are: Mrs. Frank Battles, Dr. Oliver B. Wait and William Bell Wait, Jr.

She died at her home in New York City on January 30, 1904, and is buried at First Hopkinton Cemetery, Hopkinton, Rhode Island.
