= Braille Authority of North America =

- Purpose: Standardization of braille and tactile graphics
- Location: Pittsburgh, Pennsylvania
- Website: www.brailleauthority.org

The Braille Authority of North America (BANA) is the standardizing body of English Braille orthography in the United States and Canada. It consists of a number of member organizations, such as the Braille Institute of America, the National Braille Association, and the Canadian National Institute for the Blind.

In late 2012 BANA announced the gradual phasing in of Unified English Braille for general use. Nemeth Code (1972) will continue to be used for mathematics and science, Music Braille Code (1997) for musical notation, and IPA Braille Code (2008) for linguistics.

== Member organizations ==
The following organizations are members of the BANA:

=== Full members ===
- Alternate Text Production Center of the California Community Colleges (ATPC)
- American Council of the Blind
- American Foundation for the Blind
- American Printing House for the Blind
- Association for Education and Rehabilitation of the Blind & Visually Impaired
- Associated Services for the Blind and Visually Impaired
- Braille Institute of America
- California Transcribers and Educators for the Blind and Visually Impaired
- Clovernook Center for the Blind and Visually Impaired
- CNIB (Canadian National Institute for the Blind)
- Council of Schools and Services for the Blind
- Hadley Institute for the Blind and Visually Impaired
- Horizons for the Blind
- National Braille Association
- National Braille Press, Inc.
- National Federation of the Blind
- National Library Service for the Blind and Physically Handicapped

=== Associate members ===
- Braille Authority of New Zealand Aotearoa Trust
- Crawford Technologies
- T-Base Communications
