= Henry Martyn Taylor =

British mathematician (1842–1927)

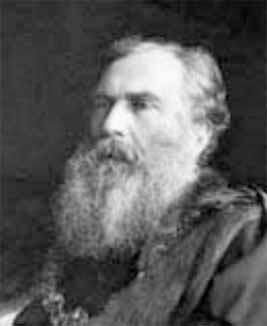
Taylor as mayor of Cambridge.

Henry Martyn Taylor, FRS, FRAS (6 June 1842, Bristol – 16 October 1927, Cambridge), was an English mathematician and barrister.

Henry Martyn Taylor was the second son of the Rev. James Taylor and Eliza Johnson. He was educated in Wakefield and at Trinity College, Cambridge, where he graduated B.A. as 3rd Wrangler in 1865.

He devised a Braille notation when he was overtaken by blindness in 1894, when engaged in the preparation of an edition of Euclid for the Cambridge University Press. By means of his ingenious and well thought out Braille notation he was enabled to transcribe many advanced scientific and mathematical works, and in 1917, with the assistance of Mr. Emblen, a blind member of the staff of the National Institute for the Blind, he perfected it. It was recognised as so comprehensive that it was soon adopted as the standard mathematical and chemical notation, and was universally used by English-speaking people until the adoption of Nemeth Braille in some countries and later Unified English Braille in all English-speaking countries.

He was elected a Fellow of the Royal Society in Jun 1898 and became Mayor of Cambridge in 1900–1901.

He died in Cambridge and is buried at the Parish of the Ascension Burial Ground in Cambridge, with his mother Eliza Taylor, née Johnson.
