= NBA (disambiguation) =

NBA is the National Basketball Association, a North American professional basketball league.

NBA or nba may also refer to:

== Arts, media, and entertainment ==
- NBA (video game series)
  - NBA (2005 video game)
- National Book Award, an American literary honor
- National Braille Association, United States
- Net Book Agreement, in British publishing
- Neue Bach-Ausgabe, an edition of J. S. Bach's work
- News Broadcasters Association, India
- North British Academy of Arts
- YoungBoy Never Broke Again, an American rapper
- Never Broke Again, a record label

== Chemicals ==
- 3-Nitrobenzanthrone, a carcinogen
- 3-Nitrobenzyl alcohol
- n-Butylamine

== Sports ==
- National Boxing Association, later World Boxing Association, United States
- Nepal Basketball Association
- Nippon Badminton Association, Japan

== Other uses ==
- .nba, a file extension used by Nero software
- Narmada Bachao Andolan, a political movement in India against a dam built on the Narmada River
- National Bank Act, the primary federal legislation authorizing the creation of national banks in the United States
- National Bar Association, United States
- National Board of Accreditation, an Indian higher education body
- Newcastle Brown Ale, an English beer
- Nihon Bus Association
- National Biodiversity Authority
- Nyemba (ISO 639-3 language code: nba)
- New Barnet railway station, London, England (National Rail station code: NBA)
