= JBI International =

US non-profit organization

JBI Library
- Formation: 22 April 1931
- Founder: Leopold Dubov
- Founded at: Manhattan, New York City, United States
- Website: www.jbilibrary.org

JBI Library, dba JBI International, formerly the Jewish Braille Institute, is an international non-profit organization created to assist visually impaired and reading disabled people around the world by providing access to publications in Braille, Large Print and Audiobook. Publications are made available in English, Hebrew, Hungarian, Russian, Polish, Romanian, Spanish and Yiddish. The organization maintains a circulating library of books particularly related to Judaism and Jewish culture.

== History ==
JBI was founded as the Jewish Braille Institute of America on April 22, 1931, in the Manhattan borough of New York City by Leopold Dubov, with the assistance of Rabbi Michael Aaronson. JBI was funded in large part by the National Federation of Temple Sisterhoods, to whom Aaronson appealed on Dubov's behalf for assistance. In spite of its location specific name, its foundational purposes included compiling a census of blind Jews throughout the world and publishing a free international Braille magazine of Jewish culture. It also intended to adapt the Moon type writing system into Yiddish and Hebrew and to devise an international Hebrew Braille code. Other focuses included the religious instruction of blind Jewish children and the development of a Braille library for blind Jewish people of all ages.

By 1932, the JBI had begun publication of its monthly The Jewish Braille Review and opened its library. The National Federation, now known as the Women of Reform Judaism, continued to support the JBI, not only financially but through service, developing an international network of members to assist in translating for and disseminating books to its target audience.

=== The International Hebrew Braille Code ===
One of the primary challenges faced by the JBI was the lack of a uniform Hebrew Braille. JBI assembled an international panel to address the problem, and the first iteration of the International Hebrew Braille Code was produced in 1936, undergoing further refinements until its completion in 1944. One of the early masters of the new alphabet, Mrs. Harry A. Cole of Cleveland, Ohio, was called upon by JBI to under the first translation of the Hebrew Bible into Braille. She worked on the task of translation single-handedly for five years, although proofreaders scrutinized her work, before she completed the first Braille edition of the Hebrew Bible. In 1950, JBI International published the first Braille Torah.

In 1955, the JBI began a drive to help blind Jewish children achieve maturity in the Jewish faith through direct intervention or correspondence courses. In 1956, the Canadian Jewish Review opined that, "the institute has become the source of Jewish culture and learning for the blind", noting that the International Hebrew Braille Code it had created had been used "to supersede and replace several regional Hebrew Braille alphabets that had long been considered inadequate."

=== Relocation ===
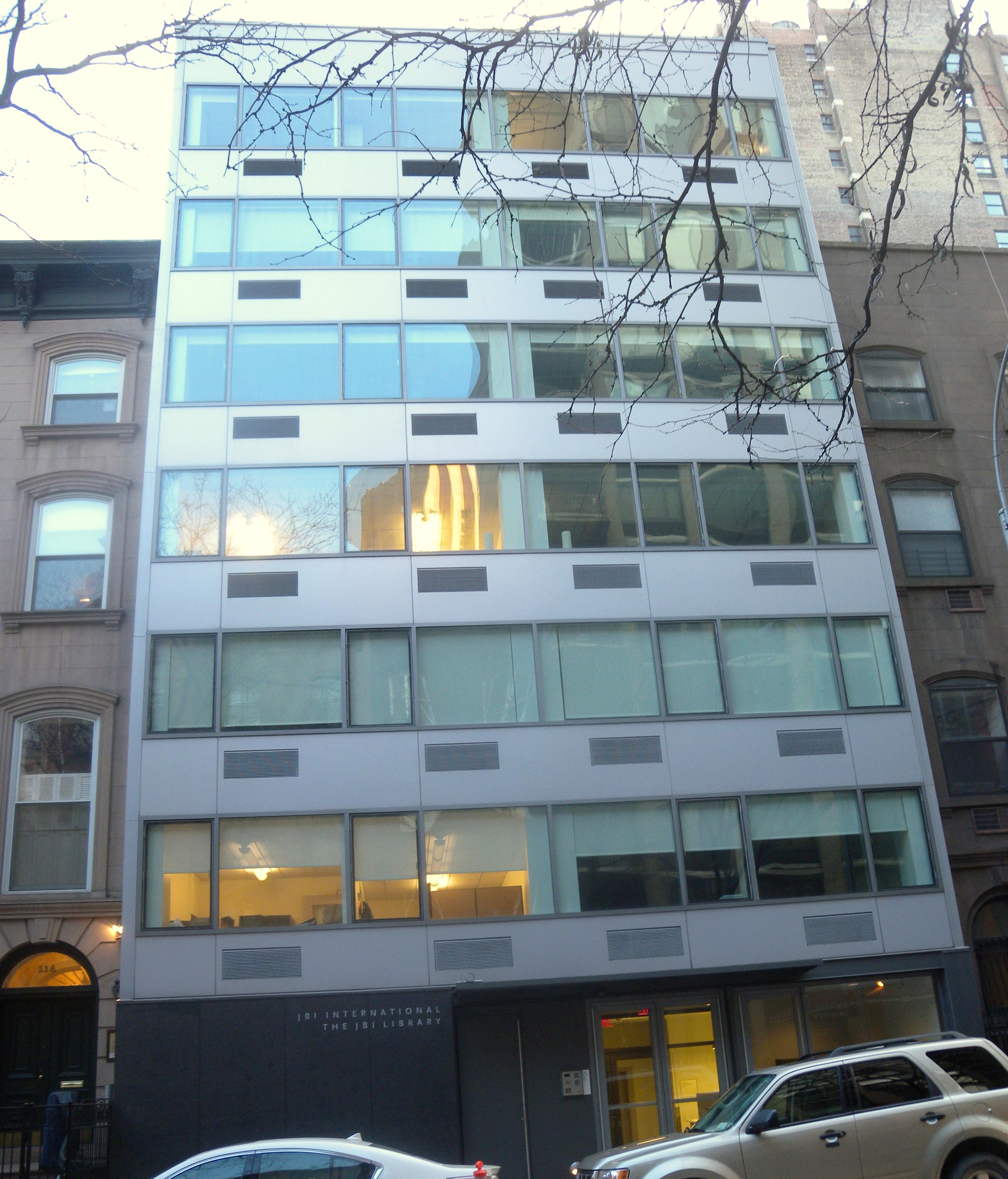
110 East 30th St

As the institution grew, it relocated several times. In 1953, it moved to 101 West Fifty-fifth Street. In 1959, it relocated its headquarters to East 48th Street of New York City; Helen Keller, then in her late 70s, sent a message to its dedication ceremony indicating that "With pride, I still read the Jewish Braille Review, which the Institute publishes for the blind, and bless the spirit of sympathy and brotherhood in which it serves both Jews and Christians in many lands." By 1961, it housed in its library there 10,000 books in Braille as well as an extensive collection of audio books. In 1968, it moved again to 110 East 30th Street in Manhattan, where it has remained.

In 1972, when its library consisted of over 20,000 volumes, the new headquarters made press by developing a "touch-and-smell fragrance garden" on its grounds for the benefit of the blind. At that time, the JBI facilities also included a sound studio wherein it could produce its audio books.

The Institution was renamed in 2001.

== See also ==
- Jewish Heritage for the Blind
- Abraham Nemeth
