= New York Institute for Special Education =

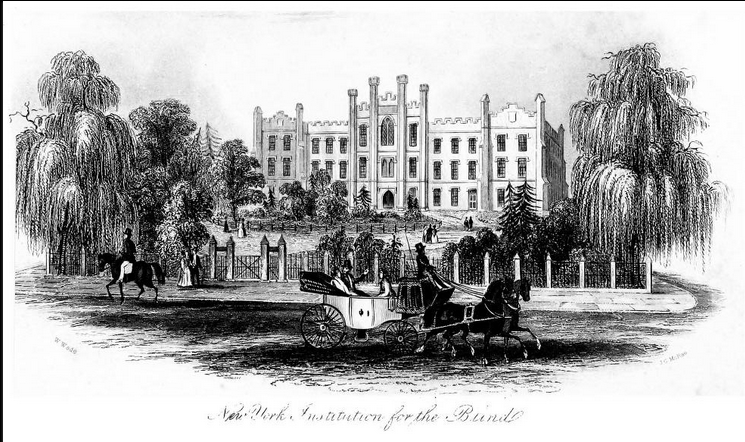
- 1851

Location
- 999 Pelham Parkway North; Bronx, New York City 10469; USA; 40.858617°N 73.859438°W

Information
- Type: Private, Special, Day & Boarding
- Established: 1831; 195 years ago
- Sister school: Overbrook School for the Blind
- Executive Director: Bernadette M. Kappen, Ph.D. (2008-2025), Brian Darcy (2025)
- Grades: P–12; Students aged 3 to 21
- Accreditation: National Commission for the Accreditation of Special Education Services
- Website: www.nyise.org

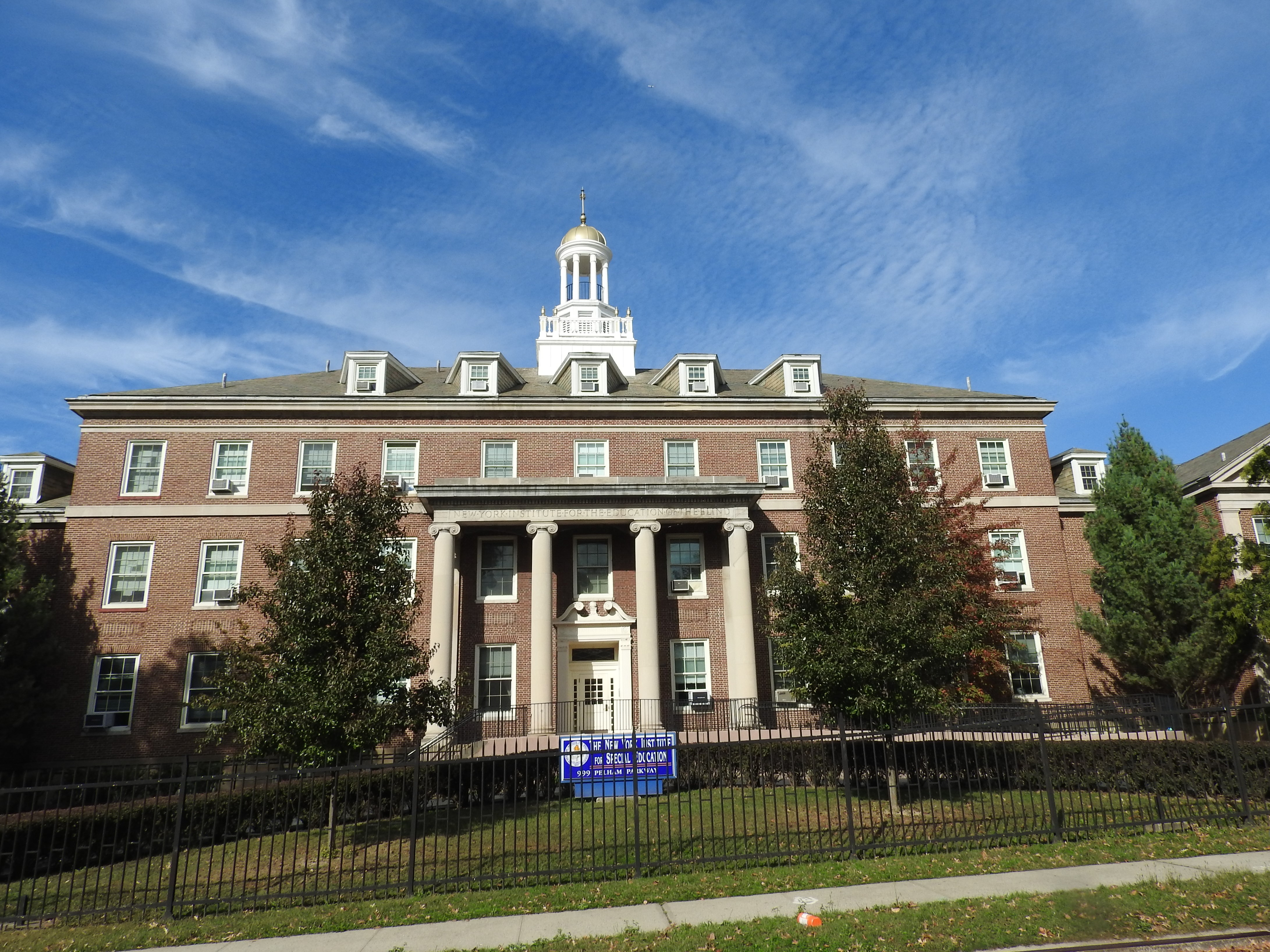
999 Pelham Parkway

The New York Institute for Special Education is a private nonprofit school in New York City. The school was founded in 1831 as a school for blind children by Samuel Wood, a Quaker philanthropist, Samuel Akerly, a physician, and John Dennison Russ, a philanthropist and physician. The school was originally named New York Institute for the Education of the Blind. It was located at 34th Street and Ninth Avenue in Manhattan, New York City.

In 1986, the school was renamed the New York Institute for Special Education (NYISE) to reflect its expanded focus on providing programs for children with learning and emotional disabilities as well as for those who are blind. The institute's multiple facilities now serve children ranging in age from newborn to age 21.

== Founding ==
Samuel Wood was a wealthy school-book publisher who had been a teacher until he was 40. Recognizing that reading books for children were few, he prepared and published a primer, The Young Child's A B C, or First Book (1806). Wood had seen eager-to-learn blind children in the city's poorhouses, where their future was bleak, and had probably heard of a movement in Boston interested in training the blind. Wood was in his sixties and of a philanthropic bent.

Samuel Akerly had been for ten years the superintendent and attending physician of the New York Institution for the Deaf. He had been active in developing instruction for deaf-mutes and became interested in doing the same for the blind. Akerly knew how to propose legislation, and he, Wood and 15 other citizens presented a petition to the New York State Legislature proposing an institution to "...improve the moral and intellectual condition of the Blind, and to instruct them in such mechanical employments as are best adapted to persons in such a condition." The legislation passed, but was amended by one state senator to limit the institution's purpose to children.

John Dennison Russ, a philanthropist and physician, had proposed on his own to instruct blind children in the poorhouse before Akerly made him aware of the newly approved institution. Russ served without salary as the first teacher of the first class — three blind orphan boys brought from the poorhouse to a private home on Canal Street. After two months, three more boys were added and the school moved to Mercer Street. Teaching was by experiment, with successful methods discovered as time progressed. A demonstration of the students' progress was given at the end of the year, generating public interest and stimulating contributions and new benefactors.

== Early growth ==
By 1833, ten more students, four of them girls, had joined the original six. In 1834, New York State began paying for some students, and New Jersey began sending children to the school. By now there were 26 students in all, and Russ was assisted by "one teacher of literary subjects, a foreman of mechanical pursuits, and a teacher of music." According to the school history,

Dr. Russ achieved results most remarkable. Besides carrying on instruction of his pupils and conducting the business of the Institution, he invented apparatus for the use of the blind, essayed to discover a means of reducing the size of books for the sightless, proposing a phonetic alphabet with forty characters and representation thereof by dots and lines, adapted and improved the methods used in European schools for representing geographical information.

While teaching, Russ maintained his private medical practice, but the move of the school from Spring Street to larger quarters at the then-remote location of Ninth Avenue and 34th Street created difficulties. Russ resigned from the school in 1835.

== Notable students and faculty ==
=== 19th century ===
Fanny Crosby, a poet who wrote the lyrics for thousands of Christian hymns, was both a student and a teacher at the institute. Blind since infancy, she entered the institute in 1835, at age 14. She was a student for 9 years, then a teacher from September 1847 to March 1858.

Grover Cleveland and his brother William came to be employed at the school in 1853 and 1854, during the years Crosby was teaching. At that time there were about 116 pupils, ranging in age from 8 to 25, half male and half female. To finance his further studies for the ministry, William was teaching the older students history, philosophy, logic, and introductory physics and chemistry. He persuaded the school to hire Grover as a bookkeeper and as teacher of the basic subjects — reading, writing, arithmetic, geography — to the younger students. Neither brother was trained to teach and it was a matter of staying one step ahead of the students.

The food at the school was poor, the pay was low, and the buildings were cold and damp. A martinet superintendent made life miserable for students and faculty alike. The Cleveland brothers would later recall their time at the institute as the bleakest in their lives.

Reflecting their lifelong friendship, Crosby prepared a series of recollections of Cleveland's days at the institute for his first run for the White House. She spoke of Cleveland as a hard worker who encouraged her to stand her ground against the domineering superintendent.

William Bell Wait, a teacher at the institute, invented New York Point, a system of writing for the blind that enjoyed wide use in the United States before the Braille system was adopted. Wait also invented the Kleidograph, a typewriter with twelve keys for embossing New York Point on paper.

=== 20th century ===
Ed Lucas, a sports writer, broadcaster and motivational speaker, was a student.

Valerie Capers, an accomplished jazz pianist and composer, was a student

== 4201 Schools Association ==
The NYISE is part of the 4201 Schools Association in New York.

== See also ==
- Blindness and education
