= International Council on English Braille =

English braille governing body

The International Council on English Braille (ICEB) is the standardization body of braille for the English speaking world. Its current membership includes the following eight countries: Australia, Canada, Ireland, Nepal, New Zealand, South Africa, the United Kingdom, and the United States. The ICEB braille standard is Unified English Braille, which has been accepted by all member states.

== Other writing systems ==
Other than languages, the ICEB also recognizes the International Phonetic Alphabet (IPA) *International Phonetic Alphabet henceforth creating braille letters for the main letters and symbols of the IPA.
