= Hebrew Braille =

Braille alphabet for the Hebrew language

Hebrew Braille ברייל עברי
- Script type: Abjad
- Print basis: Hebrew alphabet
- Languages: Hebrew

Related scripts
- Parent systems: Braille: English Braille; Hebrew Braille

Hebrew Braille (Hebrew: ברייל עברי) is the braille alphabet for Hebrew. The International Hebrew Braille Code is widely used. It was devised in the 1930s and completed in 1944. It is based on international norms, with additional letters devised to accommodate differences between English Braille and the Hebrew alphabet. Unlike Hebrew, but in keeping with other braille alphabets, Hebrew Braille is read from left to right instead of right to left, and unlike English Braille, it is an abjad, with all letters representing consonants.

== History ==
Prior to the 1930s, there were several regional variations of Hebrew Braille, but no universal system. In 1930, the Jewish Braille Institute of America, under the direction of the Synagogue Council of America, assembled an international committee for the purpose of producing a unified embossed code to be used by sightless people throughout the world. The committee membership consisted of Isaac Maletz, representing the Jewish Institute for the Blind, Jerusalem; Dr. Max Geffner, of the Blindeninstitut of Vienna; Canon C. F. Waudby, of the National Institute for the Blind, Great Britain; Leopold Dubov, of the Jewish Braille Institute of America; and Rabbi Harry J. Brevis, representing the New York Board of Rabbis. Rabbi Brevis, who had lost his eyesight in his mid 20s, and who had developed a system of Hebrew braille for his personal use as a rabbinical student while attending the Jewish Institute of Religion from 1926 and 1929, was named chairman of the committee, and Leupold Dubov, the executive director of the Jewish Braille Institute of America, was appointed secretary. In 1933, the committee voted unanimously to approve and sponsor Brevis' system for adoption as the International Hebrew Braille Code. Brevis published a selection of readings from the Bible, Mishnah, and contemporary literature using this system in 1935 under the title A Hebrew Braille Chrestomathy. Among the greater challenges faced by the committee was the accommodation of the Hebrew vowel points. In 1936, the first Hebrew Braille book was published with sponsorship from the Library of Congress: a volume of excerpts from the Talmud and other sources. The code underwent further refinements for the better part of a decade until its completion in 1944.

In 2019, software engineer Danny Sadinoff created Hebrew Braille characters for Torah cantillation marks and a computer program that combines them with existing Braille biblical text, allowing selected verses to be printed with their chanting notation. The system was developed for a blind student preparing to read Torah verses at her bat mitzvah.

== Basic alphabet ==
Because Hebrew Braille derives from English Braille, there is not a one-to-one match between Hebrew letters in print and in braille. Most obviously, four consonants with the dagesh point in print have distinct letters in braille, but three others require a dagesh prefix ⠘ in braille. The different placements of the dot on the print letter shin also correspond to two different letters in braille. On the other hand, the distinct final forms of some letters in print are not reflected in braille.

In the table below, the braille letters corresponding to basic letters in print are in the top row, while those derived by pointing in print, and which have a distinct pronunciation in Modern Hebrew, are in the second row.

Basic	Braille	⠁ (braille pattern dots-1)	⠧ (braille pattern dots-1236)	⠛ (braille pattern dots-1245)	⠙ (braille pattern dots-145)	⠓ (braille pattern dots-125)	⠺ (braille pattern dots-2456)	⠵ (braille pattern dots-1356)	⠭ (braille pattern dots-1346)	⠞ (braille pattern dots-2345)	⠚ (braille pattern dots-245)	⠡ (braille pattern dots-16)
Basic	Print	א ’	ב v	ג g	ד dh	ה h	ו w	ז z	ח ḥ	ט ṭ	י y	כ ך kh
Dagesh	Braille		⠃ (braille pattern dots-12)				⠬ (braille pattern dots-346)					⠅ (braille pattern dots-13)
Dagesh	Print		בּ b bb				וּ û ww					כּ ךּ k kk

Basic	Braille	⠇ (braille pattern dots-123)	⠍ (braille pattern dots-134)	⠝ (braille pattern dots-1345)	⠎ (braille pattern dots-234)	⠫ (braille pattern dots-1246)	⠋ (braille pattern dots-124)	⠮ (braille pattern dots-2346)	⠟ (braille pattern dots-12345)	⠗ (braille pattern dots-1235)	⠩ (braille pattern dots-146)	⠹ (braille pattern dots-1456)
Basic	Print	ל l	מ ם m	נ ן n	ס s	ע ‘	פ ף f	צ ץ ts	ק q	ר r	ש שׁ sh	ת th
Dagesh	Braille						⠏ (braille pattern dots-1234)				⠱ (braille pattern dots-156)	⠳ (braille pattern dots-1256)
Dagesh	Print						פּ p pp				שׂ ś	תּ t tt

For other pointed print consonants, such as gimel with dagesh גּ, the braille prefix is used: ⠘⠛. Historically, this sequence has two values: a 'hard' gee [ɡ] (cf. plain gimel ⠛ [ɣ]), and a double/long gee [ɡː]. However, it is not distinct in Modern Hebrew. It is not clear if the prefix can be added to letters that have partners in the bottom row of the table above to distinguish, say, dagesh hazak kk from dagesh kal k, or ww from û.

When transcribing completely unpointed print texts, only the top row of braille letters is used.

== Vowel pointing ==
Apart from those written with ו and י and thus obligatory in print, vowels are optional in braille just as they are in print. When they are written, braille vowels are full letters rather than diacritics.

Braille		⠊ (braille pattern dots-24)	⠌ (braille pattern dots-34)	⠑ (braille pattern dots-15)	⠉ (braille pattern dots-14)	⠣ (braille pattern dots-126)	⠪ (braille pattern dots-246)	⠥ (braille pattern dots-136)
Print		◌ִ i	◌ֵ e	◌ֶ ẹ	◌ַ a	◌ָ ọ	◌ֹ o	◌ֻ u
Braille	⠠ (braille pattern dots-6)	⠔ (braille pattern dots-35)	⠌ (braille pattern dots-34) ⠚ (braille pattern dots-245)	⠢ (braille pattern dots-26)	⠒ (braille pattern dots-25)	⠜ (braille pattern dots-345)	⠕ (braille pattern dots-135)	⠬ (braille pattern dots-346)
Print	◌ְ ə	יִ î	יֵ ê	◌ֱ ĕ	◌ֲ ă	◌ֳ ŏ	וֹ ô	וּ û

Print digraphs with אְ schwa (אֱ ĕ, אֲ ă, אֳ ŏ, bottom row), and the matres lectionis (וּ û, וֹ ô, יִ î) are derived in braille by modifying (lowering or reflecting) the base vowel. יֵ ê does not have a dedicated braille letter, and is written as the vowel ⠌ e plus ⠚ yod.

== Numbers ==
Braille	⠼ (braille pattern dots-3456) ⠁ (braille pattern dots-1)	⠼ (braille pattern dots-3456) ⠃ (braille pattern dots-12)	⠼ (braille pattern dots-3456) ⠉ (braille pattern dots-14)	⠼ (braille pattern dots-3456) ⠙ (braille pattern dots-145)	⠼ (braille pattern dots-3456) ⠑ (braille pattern dots-15)	⠼ (braille pattern dots-3456) ⠋ (braille pattern dots-124)	⠼ (braille pattern dots-3456) ⠛ (braille pattern dots-1245)	⠼ (braille pattern dots-3456) ⠓ (braille pattern dots-125)	⠼ (braille pattern dots-3456) ⠊ (braille pattern dots-24)	⠼ (braille pattern dots-3456) ⠚ (braille pattern dots-245)
Print	1	2	3	4	5	6	7	8	9	0

== Punctuation ==
The punctuation used with Hebrew Braille, according to UNESCO (2013), is as follows:

,	’	;	:	.	!	? “	"	–	/	*
... ( ... )			... [ ... ]				—		...	

== Jewish Heritage for the Blind ==
Jewish Heritage for the Blind, although organizationally unrelated to Jewish Braille Institute, has a related mission: to provide Braille and Large Print texts, in particular for religious services.
