= New York Point =

Tactile alphabet invented by William Bell Wait

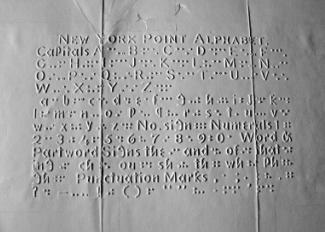
- Script type: Alphabet
- Creator: William Bell Wait
- Period: 1868–1918
- Languages: English

Related scripts
- Parent systems: Night writing: New York Point
- Sister systems: Braille

Unicode
- Unicode range: (not supported)

New York Point (New York Point:) is a braille-like system of tactile writing for the blind invented by William Bell Wait (1839–1916), a teacher in the New York Institute for the Education of the Blind. The system used one to four pairs of points set side by side, each containing one or two dots. (Letters of one through four pairs, each with two dots, would be ⟨ ⟩ ⟨ ⟩ ⟨ ⟩ ⟨ ⟩.) The most common letters are written with the fewest points, a strategy also employed by the competing American Braille.

Capital letters were cumbersome in New York Point, each being four dots wide, and so were not generally used. Likewise, the four-dot-wide hyphen and apostrophe were generally omitted. When capitals, hyphens, or apostrophes were used, they sometimes caused legibility problems, and a separate capital sign was never agreed upon. According to Helen Keller, this caused literacy problems among blind children, and was one of the chief arguments against New York Point and in favor of one of the braille alphabets.

New York Point competed with the American Braille alphabet, which consisted of fixed cells two points wide and three high. Books written in embossed alphabets like braille are quite bulky, and New York Point's system of two horizontal lines of dots was an advantage over the three lines required for braille; the principle of writing the most common letters with the fewest dots was likewise an advantage of New York Point and American Braille over English Braille.

Wait advocated the New York System as more logical than either the American Braille or the English Braille alphabets, and the three scripts competed in what was known as the War of the Dots. Around 1916, agreement settled on English Braille standardized to French Braille letter order, chiefly because of the superior punctuation compared with New York Point, the speed of reading braille, the large amount of written material available in English Braille compared with American Braille, and the international accessibility offered by following French alphabetical order.

Wait also invented the "Kleidograph", a typewriter with twelve keys for embossing New York Point on paper, and the "Stereograph", for creating metal plates to be used in printing.

== Alphabet ==
New York Point is not supported by Unicode, as of version 14.0. Like braille, there are contractions: single letters in New York Point that correspond to sequences of letters in print.

Lower-case letters and contractions
New York Point										
New York Point	⠘	⠹	⠜	⠚	⠈	⠸	⠧	⠷	⠉	⠺
Print	a	b	c	d	e	f	g	h	i	j
New York Point										
New York Point	⠼	⠋	⠙	⠃	⠑	⠎	⠏	⠓	⠊	⠁
Print	k	l	m	n	o	p	q	r	s	t
New York Point										
New York Point	⠇	⠪	⠣	⠯	⠕	⠾	⠱	⠞	⠵	⠮
Print	u	v	w	x	y	z	the	and	of	that
New York Point										
New York Point	⠳	⠽	⠝	⠗	⠛	⠫	⠟	⠻		
Print	ing	ou	ch	sh	th	wh	ph	gh		

New York Point is read from left to right. A symbol consists of one to four consecutive cells that are each two points high and one point wide. Capital letters all consist of four cells. Each capital letter is derived from the corresponding lower-case letter by adding at the end a horizontal line consisting of as many points as are needed for the capital letter to be four points wide (i.e. a line of three points to a lower-case letter that is one cell wide, a line of two points to a lower-case letter that is two points wide, and one point to a lower-case letter that is three points wide). The points are added in the lower halves of the cells if the final cell of the lower-case letter only has a point in the upper half; otherwise, the points are added in the upper halves of the cells.

Capital letters
New York Point										
New York Point	⡜	⡹	⢜	⢺	⡎	⡸	⢧	⢷	⢹	⡺
Print	A	B	C	D	E	F	G	H	I	J
New York Point										
New York Point	⢼	⢫	⡝	⢣	⡕	⢎	⢏	⢳	⢪	⢱
Print	K	L	M	N	O	P	Q	R	S	T
New York Point										
New York Point	⢇	⡪	⡣	⢯	⢕	⢾				
Print	U	V	W	X	Y	Z				

== Punctuation ==
Like in braille, there is a number sign that converts letters to digits. The ten digits are the same four-dot patterns found in braille, but with entirely different values:

New York Point											
New York Point	⠛	⠉	⠚	⠋	⠙	⠓	⠊	⠑	⠃	⠁	⠿
Print	1	2	3	4	5	6	7	8	9	0	(num)
(Braille value)	7	3	0	6	4	8	9	5	2	1	⠼

The only punctuation marks three-dots wide are the number sign above and the quotation mark, which has the same form as the letter q. The dash, hyphen, and apostrophe are four dots wide.

New York Point											
New York Point	⠁	⠂	⠛	⠓	⠙	⠚	⠋	⠏	⡇	⢽	⣹
Print	,	;	.	:	?	!	( )	“ ”	—	–	'

== Musical notation ==
Notes are made by combining two 'primitives', which are the digits 1–7:

Half-symbol							
Note value	C	D	E	F	G	A	B
Length value	whole note	half note	quarter note	eighth note	sixteenth note	thirty-second note	sixty-fourth note

⟨ ⟩ is thus a whole C note, ⟨ ⟩ a quarter D note, etc. In chords, the length is only given for the first note mentioned.

These may be prefixed by ⟨ ⟩ ♯, ⟨ ⟩ ♭, or ⟨ ⟩ ♮, and suffixed by ⟨ ⟩ dot (length × 1½). These may be doubled, as in print.

The note is preceded by its octave, which is written as the number plus an upper dot: ⟨ ⟩ 5th 8va, ⟨ ⟩ 2nd 8va, etc.

Rests are two lower dots plus the length: ⟨ ⟩ a whole rest, ⟨ ⟩ a half rest, etc.

Chords are written as intervals, which is the number plus a lower dot: ⟨ ⟩ is a third, etc. The sign ⟨ ⟩ signals a change in octave. Thus a chord of three notes spanning the 4th to 5th octaves is

4th-8va C-whole 5th-inv'l with 5th-8va E

See Wait's publications for additional conventions.

== See also ==
- Blindness education
- Korean Braille#History – A script like New York Point was used for Korean before 6-dot braille was introduced.

== Notes ==
In these charts, the first row of NYP are graphic images, and the second row are braille cells turned on their side. Older browsers may not support the latter. NYP letters should only be as wide as their number of dots. However, since 2×3 braille cells are substituted for New York Point in the second row of their table, the one-dot-wide letters e, i, and t are wrongly shown as being as wide as others. The same inaccuracy occurs with the nine, zero, comma, and semicolon in the number and punctuation tables. The top row gives the proper widths.
