= Braille Authority of the United Kingdom =

Standardising body

The Braille Authority of the United Kingdom (BAUK) was the standardizing body of English Braille orthography in the United Kingdom.

In 2008 BAUK merged with COTIS (Confederation of Transcribed Information Services) and UKABP (United Kingdom Association of Braille Producers). The resulting organisation is the UKAAF (United Kingdom Association for Accessible Formats).
