= American Braille =

Braille alphabet used in the US before the adoption of standardized English braille

American Braille Modified Braille
- Script type: Alphabet
- Period: 1878–1918
- Print basis: English alphabet
- Languages: English

Related scripts
- Parent systems: Braille: (re-ordered); American Braille

American Braille was a popular braille alphabet used in the United States before the adoption of standardized English Braille in 1918. It was developed by Joel W. Smith, a blind piano tuning teacher at Perkins Institution for the Blind in Boston, and introduced in 1878 as Modified Braille. In 1900 it was renamed American Braille.

Rather than ordering the letters numerically, as was done in French Braille and the (reordered) English Braille also used in the US at the time, in American Braille the letters were partially reassigned by frequency, with the most-common letters being written with the fewest dots. This significantly improved writing speed with the slate and stylus, which wrote one dot at a time, but lost its advantage with the braille typewriters that became practical after 1950.

American Braille was the alphabet used by Helen Keller.

== Letters ==
In numerical order and with their modern French and English Braille equivalents, the letters are:

Letter	⠁ (braille pattern dots-1)	⠃ (braille pattern dots-12)	⠉ (braille pattern dots-14)	⠙ (braille pattern dots-145)	⠑ (braille pattern dots-15)	⠋ (braille pattern dots-124)	⠛ (braille pattern dots-1245)	⠓ (braille pattern dots-125)	⠊ (braille pattern dots-24)	⠅ (braille pattern dots-13)	⠇ (braille pattern dots-123)	⠍ (braille pattern dots-134)	⠟ (braille pattern dots-12345)
American Braille value	a	t	r	d	o	f	g	h	i	s	l	m	q
French/British Braille value	a	b	c	d	e	f	g	h	i	k	l	m	q
Letter	⠗ (braille pattern dots-1235)	⠥ (braille pattern dots-136)	⠧ (braille pattern dots-1236)	⠽ (braille pattern dots-13456)	⠷ (braille pattern dots-12356)	⠣ (braille pattern dots-126)	⠩ (braille pattern dots-146)	⠻ (braille pattern dots-12456)	⠺ (braille pattern dots-2456)	⠂ (braille pattern dots-2)	⠜ (braille pattern dots-345)	⠬ (braille pattern dots-346)	⠚ (braille pattern dots-245)
American Braille value	k	u	v	j	x	b	p	z	w	e	y	n	c
French/British Braille value	r	u	v	y	à · of	ê · gh	î · sh	ï · er	w	, · , or ea	@ · ar	on · ing	j

Not quite half of the letters retained their French Braille values.

== Punctuation ==
Punctuation was as follows. Comma, semicolon, and parentheses were the same as in English Braille.

Punctuation	⠤ (braille pattern dots-36)		⠄ (braille pattern dots-3)	⠆ (braille pattern dots-23)	⠴ (braille pattern dots-356)	⠲ (braille pattern dots-256)	⠾ (braille pattern dots-23456)	⠒ (braille pattern dots-25)	⠶ (braille pattern dots-2356)	⠈ (braille pattern dots-4)	⠦ (braille pattern dots-236)
American Braille value	Caps	.	,	;	:	?	!	-	( )	'	"
French/British Braille value	-		,	;	(na)	.	with	:	( )	(accent)	?

== Sources ==
- Irwin, Robert (1955). As I Saw It. American Foundation for the Blind.
