= National Braille Association =

American non-profit organization

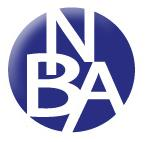
- Abbreviation: NBA
- Formation: 1945
- Founded at: New York City, United States
- Headquarters: Rochester, New York, United States
- Parent organization: Braille Authority of North America

The National Braille Association, Inc. (NBA) is a 501(c)(3) non-profit organization headquartered in Rochester, New York. The association assists, educates, and certifies transcribers and narrators producing reading materials for the visually impaired, and provides braille materials to persons who are print handicapped at below cost. It is a member of the Braille Authority of North America.

== History ==
The organization was founded in 1945 in New York City as the National Braille Club. At the time, there weren't many standards or direct guidelines for someone to follow while preparing braille. In an effort to standardize the process, the National Braille Club sought to provide training so that transcribers across the country were all providing similarly formatted materials.

In 1946 the organization began publishing the Bulletin, a quarterly peer-reviewed journal of skills articles intended to provide technical instruction to those transcribing braille.

In 1957 the National Braille Club began holding conferences where braille transcribers from around North America would collect in person and receive training. Since then the conferences have been adjusted slightly in format and frequency. In 2020 it was hosted using a virtual platform for the first time ever.

In 1964 the National Braille Club was renamed to the National Braille Association. Soon after, they would form the Braille Book Bank located in New Jersey. The book bank provided transcribed reading materials for readers all over the United States.

Later in the early 2000s, the book bank and transcription service were discontinued, as there were many transcribing groups and braille publishing houses around the country, but few training organizations. Rather than attempt to manage both efforts, NBA chose to focus exclusively on training.

== Services ==
=== Professional development ===
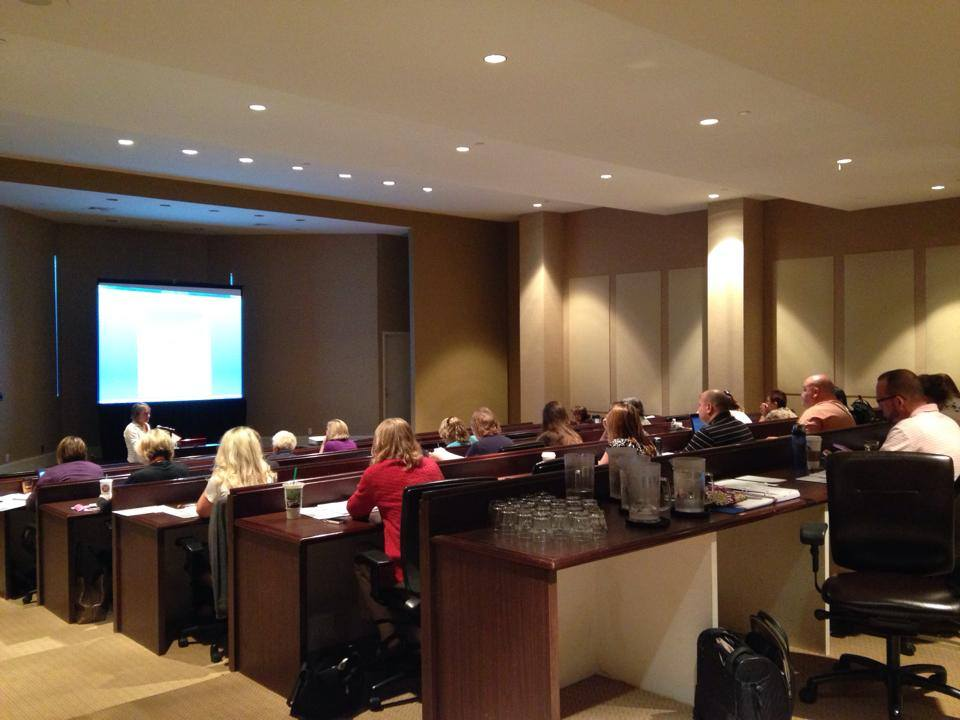
Workshop session during the 2013 NBA Fall Professional Development Conference in Colorado Springs, Colorado

Since 1957 the organization has been hosting in person conferences where braille transcribers attend trainings taught by experts from around North America. The frequency and format of the conferences has been adjusted over the years, but it has traditionally focused on providing classroom style training for transcribers on various topics. In recent decades, the conferences have primarily been either a three-day or two and a half day schedule, with workshop sessions in the mornings and afternoons.

Historically, conference attendance was only open to members, as some of the meal functions also serve as membership meetings. That rule was later adjusted and non-members are now invited to attend, though meal functions often still include membership votes like the installation of new officers to the board of directors.

In addition to providing trainings during Professional Development Conferences, trainers can be hired to travel directly to a site and provide customized education on an array of topics.

=== Training publications ===
Some workshops from previous conferences have been redeveloped into standalone training manuals and are available in print, and ebook.

=== Membership services ===
The organization is member-supported, with dues paying members primarily existing in the United States. There are some Canadian members and a few from other countries. Members gain access to educational tools like a peer-reviewed journal of skills articles, a technical support forum, an archive of training videos, and more.

=== Braille formats and textbook certification ===
NBA is the only organization that certifies transcribers in the Principles of Print to Braille Transcription formats guidelines published by the Braille Authority of North America. The exam process consists of a transcriber taking a mini-textbook and transcribing it using the most recent Textbook/Formats guidelines.

=== Lifetime Achievement Award ===
Since 2011 the National Braille Association has selected a single recipient each year to be awarded the Lifetime Achievement Award. Nominations for the award can be submitted by anyone who wishes to nominate a person they feel has made a significant contribution to braille through their work.
