= Braille music =

Braille form of musical notation

Braille cell, 2 dots wide by 3 dots high

Braille music is a braille code that allows music to be notated using braille cells so music can be read by visually impaired musicians. The system was incepted by Louis Braille.

Braille music uses the same six-position braille cell as literary braille. However braille music assigns its own meanings and has its own syntax and abbreviations. Almost anything that can be written in print music notation can be written in braille music notation. However, the notation is an independent and well-developed system with its own conventions.

The world's largest collection of the notation is at the Library of Congress in the United States.

== Learning Braille music ==
Braille music, as with print music, uses a notation system to transcribe the notes, rhythm, and other aspects of a piece of music. Because blind musicians may need both hands to play their instrument, braille music is designed to ease the memorization of a score. Some aspects of the system are therefore more logical or simplified compared to print music; for example, identifying Middle C requires simply reading the written note rather than understanding where it falls on a staff. Visually impaired musicians can begin learning braille music about the time they have reasonable competence reading literary braille.

=== Teaching Braille music ===
Braille music for beginners, like print music for beginners, is quite simple. Music teachers with no previous knowledge of braille music can easily learn the rudiments of braille music notation and keep a step or two ahead of the student who is learning braille music. Some common print method books have a version in braille so both books can be used alongside each other. Contact Julia Hart (Elementary Music Teacher) for resources on introducing braille music to young learners.

=== Transcribing music into Braille ===
Many standard works for some genres, for each instrument appear in braille. In the US, they are available from the National Library Service for the Blind and Print Disabled (NLS) of the Library of Congress (free for qualified people) and elsewhere. Most countries have a similar national library.

However, many visually impaired musicians need music that has never before been transcribed to braille music. In the United States, Canada, United Kingdom, and many other countries a network of braille music transcribers transcribe such music.

Another option is to use a braille-output computer-music system. Most such software automatically converts print notation (sheet music) into braille. While Goodfeel is the oldest and best known braille music translator, there are now other options, including BrailleMUSE, Sao Mai Braille, among others.

== Introduction to Braille music symbols and syntax ==
Some of the most common braille music symbols and combinations are summarized in the chart below. Note that the notes follow the do-re-mi mnemonic, with do (that is, C) abbreviated 'd', and the other notes following alphabetically from there, so that C is written 'd', D is written 'e', E is 'f', F is 'g', G is 'h', A is 'i' and B is 'j'.

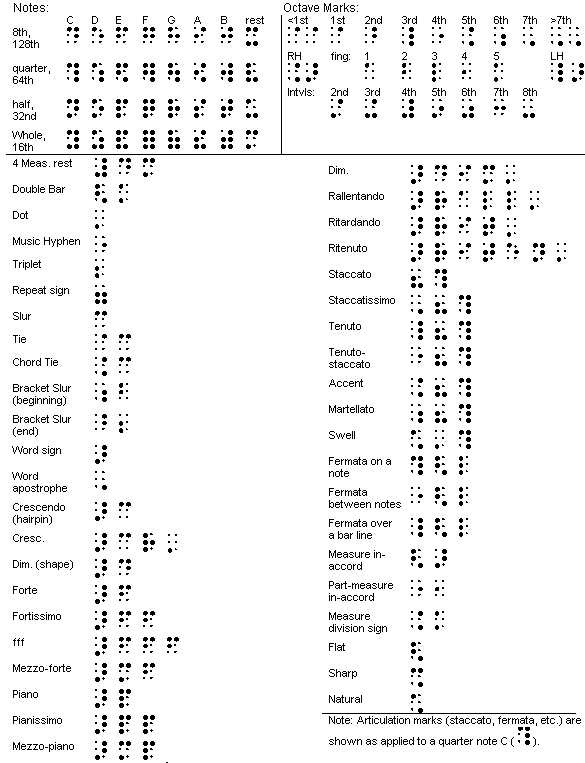

=== Pitch and rhythm ===
As the table below shows, each symbol shows the pitch and choice of two rhythmic lengths of a note which will be context-clear. The notes are noted in dots 1, 2, 4, and 5, while rhythm is noted in dots 3 and 6. Braille aligned the notes with the solfège system, so the note C uses the letter 'd' (dots 1,4,5) for "do". In the full scale, C–D–E–F–G–A–B use the same Braille characters as the letters d–e–f–g–h–i–j. Without dot 3 or 6, the indicated note is an eighth note (quaver). With dot 6, it is a quarter note; dot 3, a half note; and dots 3,6, a whole note. Every rhythm symbol does double up in meaning: 8th notes match 128th notes; quarter notes (crotchets) match 64th notes; half notes match 32nd notes; and whole notes match 16th notes (semiquavers). Beginners first learn the most common rhythmic value (8th, quarter, half, and whole notes). For advanced users no rhythmic ambiguity arises as the context, including time signature and bar lines, makes the intended rhythmic value clear. For instance, in a measure of 4/4 time that includes only the symbol with dots 1,3,4 (whole or 16th rest), those facts clarify that the symbol is a whole rest.

Notes in Braille music symbols
Rhythmic length	C	D	E	F	G	A	B	Rest
Eighth and 128th	⠙	⠑	⠋	⠛	⠓	⠊	⠚	⠭
Quarter and 64th	⠹	⠱	⠫	⠻	⠳	⠪	⠺	⠧
Half and 32nd	⠝	⠕	⠏	⠟	⠗	⠎	⠞	⠥
Whole and 16th	⠽	⠵	⠯	⠿	⠷	⠮	⠾	⠍

Accidentals in Braille music symbols
Accidental	Mark
Flat	⠣
Sharp	⠩
Natural	⠡

=== Octave marks ===
An octave mark is included before the first note to specify its octave and when it changes unexpectedly. For instance, the 4th Octave is the octave starting with middle C and going up to the B above middle C. A melody clearly proceeding upward from the first octave can, if moving by step, proceed to the second, third, and fourth octaves without requiring additional octave signs. The rule is that, save for an octave mark specifying otherwise, notes move by a unison/no change, 2nd, or 3rd rather than a 6th, 7th, or octave. For instance, the following moves upward continuously, ending in octave 5:

Octave 2 C C D E F G A B C D E F G A B C D E F G A B B C C

The rule for 4ths and 5ths is more conservative. Save for an octave sign specifying otherwise, any melodic leap of a 4th or 5th stays in the same octave as the previous note. For instance, this always stays within Octave 2:

Octave 2 C G D A E B F C G D A E

Because of the use of octave marks, clef symbols are not required in braille music. On occasion, clef symbols (bass clef, treble clef, or other) will be given so the visually impaired musician will be aware of every detail of the print score.

Octave marks in Braille music symbols
Octave	Mark
Below first	⠈⠈
First	⠈
Second	⠘
Third	⠸
Fourth	⠐
Fifth	⠨
Sixth	⠰
Seventh	⠠
Above seventh	⠠⠠

=== Musical markings ===
Musical indications like diminuendo, crescendo, or ritardando are inserted inline with the note and rhythm notation and, to differentiate them from note, octave, and other musical signs, always preceded by the "word sign" (dots 3,4,5). See the table below for some examples:

Dynamic and tempo marks in Braille music symbols
Dynamic/tempo	Mark
Word sign	⠜
Fortississimo	⠜⠋⠋⠋
Fortissimo	⠜⠋⠋
Forte	⠜⠋
Mezzo-forte	⠜⠍⠋
Mezzo-piano	⠜⠍⠏
Piano	⠜⠏
Pianissimo	⠜⠏⠏
Crescendo	⠜⠉
Crescendo	⠜⠉⠗⠄
Diminuendo	⠜⠙
Diminuendo	⠜⠙⠊⠍⠄
Rallentando	⠜⠗⠁⠇⠇⠄
Ritardando	⠜⠗⠊⠞⠄
Ritenuto	⠜⠗⠊⠞⠑⠝⠄

Slurs may be indicated by a slur sign between two notes or bracket slur surrounding a group of notes to be slurred.

Musical signs such as staccato or tenuto are generally placed before the note or chord they affect. The musical signs in the table below are shown modifying a quarter note C (dots 1,4,5,6):

Articulation marks in Braille music symbols
Articulation	Mark
Staccato	⠦⠹
Staccatissimo	⠠⠦⠹
Tenuto	⠸⠦⠹
Tenuto-staccato	⠐⠦⠹
Accent	⠨⠦⠹
Martellato	⠰⠦⠹
Swell	⠡⠄⠹

"Music hyphen" states that a measure will be continued on the next line (this happens somewhat more often in braille music than in print music).

A "word apostrophe" indicates that the word will be continued on the following line.

Fingering marks are shown in the table below:

Fingering marks in Braille music symbols
Fingering	Mark
Right hand	⠨⠜
Left hand	⠸⠜
First finger	⠁
Second finger	⠃
Third finger	⠇
Fourth finger	⠂
Fifth finger	⠅

=== Repetition symbols ===
Braille music tends to be rather bulky. Because of this, a system of repetition symbols—much more extensive than that in print music—exists to reduce page turns, size of scores, and expense of printing.

The repetition symbol (dots 2,3,5,6) is used like the printed intra-bar symbol to indicate that a beat, half measure, or full measure is to be repeated.

In addition, braille music often includes instructions such as "repeat measure 2 here" or "repeat measures 5–7 here". Such are in addition to the commonly used repeat marks and first and second endings.

=== Contrapuntal lines and chords within a staff ===
Unlike print music notation, braille music is a linear format. Therefore, certain conventions must be used to indicate contrapuntal lines and chords (where more than one note is played simultaneously within a staff).

==== In-accords ====
Independent contrapuntal lines within a staff are indicated via whole- or part-measure in-accords. The first of the contrapuntal lines is given, then the second, enclosed by the in-accord symbols. The in-accord symbols indicate that the two lines are to be played simultaneously.

==== Interval notation ====
Homophonic chordal sections are written using interval notation. For instance, the notation "quarter-note-C, 3rd, 5th" would indicate playing a C along with the notes a 3rd and 5th higher than C, making a chord C-E-G a quarter note in length. Reading the interval notation is somewhat complicated by the fact that some staves use bottom-up notation (the bottom note of each chord is specified and intervals are read upwards from the given note) and some use top-down notation (the top note of each chord is specified and intervals are read downwards from the given note). The modern convention is to specify the main note (either the bass line or melody line) and let the intervals go up or down from there as appropriate. For instance, in most piano music the left hand specifies the bottom note and intervals go bottom-up while the right hand specifies the top note and intervals go top-down. Many older scores have all staves reading bottom-up or all reading top-down. Most scores have a note indicating the direction of the interval notation. However, in some older scores the direction must be established from the context. By convention, in-accords are given in the same direction as the interval notation. Thus, examining the in-accords is a key to unlock which reading applies.

Interval marks in Braille music symbols
Interval	Mark
Second	⠌
Third	⠬
Fourth	⠼
Fifth	⠔
Sixth	⠴
Seventh	⠒
Eighth	⠤

=== Dealing with different staves ===
Printed music is often written on simultaneous staves. For instance, piano music is typically written on two which compose the grand staff: one for treble clef (which soprano singers use) and one for bass clef. Standard choral work uses this mainly where they do not cross or four where they do, as for string quartet music (the most common added clefs are alto and/or tenor). The notes in different staves that play simultaneously are aligned vertically. Because of the linear nature of braille music and the fact that the blind musician can typically read only one staff at a time, multiple staves are handled in several ways depending on the complexity of the music and other considerations. Bar over bar format is most similar to print music with right-hand notation on the top line and left-hand notation on the bottom line. Some degree of vertical alignment between the right and left hands is maintained. Other ways of dealing with multiple-staff music are: line over line format, section by section format; paragraph style; and bar by bar format. As a rule these take up less space on the page but require more of the musician in working out how to fit the staves together. For instance, in a piano score notated in section by section format, the right-hand part may be written out for the first 8 measures, followed by the left-hand part. No attempt is made to align the parts. The same procedure is followed for measures 9–16, and so on, section by section, throughout the score. The blind musician learns and memorizes one section right hand alone, then left hand alone, then works out the hands together by memory and referencing various spots in the braille score to work out how the sections fit together. A note from the transcriber often clarifies the format used. However, with many older and more complex scores the format must be determined by examination of the music and context.

== Variations in Braille music ==
Over the years and in the many different countries, a variety of minor differences in braille music practice have arisen. Some have preferred a different standard for interval or staff notation or used different codes for various less common musical notations. An international effort to standardize the braille music code culminated in updates summarized in the Music Braille Code 1997 and detailed in New International Manual of Braille Music Notation (1997) However, users should be aware that they will encounter divergences when ordering scores from printing houses and libraries because these are often older and from various countries.

== See also ==
- Blind musicians
