= Caryn Navy =

American mathematician and computer scientist

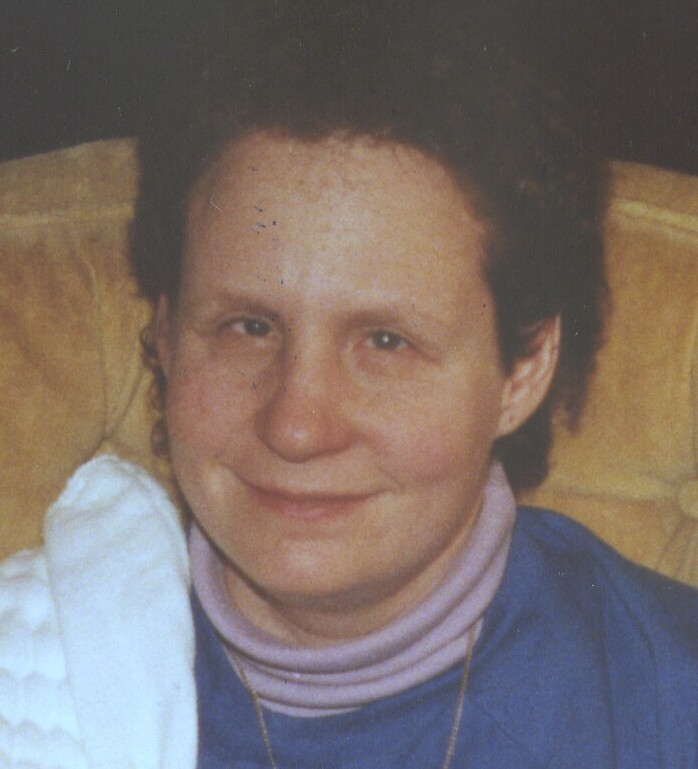
- Born: July 5, 1953 (age 73); Brooklyn, New York
- Spouse: David Holladay

Academic background
- Education: Massachusetts Institute of Technology
- Alma mater: University of Wisconsin–Madison
- Thesis: Nonparacompactness in Para-Lindelöf Spaces (1981)
- Doctoral advisor: Mary Ellen Rudin

Academic work
- Discipline: Mathematics; Computer science
- Sub-discipline: Set-theoretic topology Braille technology

Caryn Linda Navy (born July 5, 1953) is an American mathematician and computer scientist. Blind since childhood, she is chiefly known for her work in set-theoretic topology and Braille technology.

== Early life ==
Navy was born in Brooklyn, New York in 1953. Born premature, she was diagnosed as totally blind from retinopathy of prematurity. Her family soon discovered that she could actually see from the corner of one eye, but at age 10 she lost all sight due to retinal detachment.

The next year, in sixth grade, Navy began learning to read and write Braille at school. She also learned the Nemeth Braille system for writing mathematics, which became her favorite subject. She enjoyed team math competitions, and at age 14 independently rediscovered Euclid's formula for even perfect numbers. She also learned Hebrew Braille in preparation for her bat mitzvah service. At age 16 Navy was hired for her first job, as a Dictaphone typist in New York City. She took a class to learn to travel the New York City Subway.

== Education ==
Navy attended the Massachusetts Institute of Technology 1971–1975, majoring in mathematics. The only textbook she had in Braille was her calculus book. All her other books were obtained as audiobooks from Recording for the Blind. At MIT, her undergraduate advisor James Munkres introduced her to the subject of topology. Upon her graduation with a bachelor's degree in mathematics in 1975, she received the AMITA Senior Academic Award from the Association of MIT Alumnae. Early in her undergraduate career, Navy met David Holladay, an electrical engineering student. He looked up enough Braille to write her a note after their first meeting. They were married after graduation.

Navy attended graduate school at the University of Wisconsin–Madison, majoring in mathematics, with a minor in computer science. During her graduate education, she used an Optacon device to read textbooks that were not available in Braille or as audiobooks. She received her M.A. in 1977, and her Ph.D. in 1981 under the supervision of topologist Mary Ellen Rudin.

== Mathematics ==
Navy's doctoral thesis, "Nonparacompactness in Para-Lindelöf Spaces", was important in the development of metrizability theory. The paper examines the properties of para-Lindelöf topological spaces, which are a generalization of both Lindelöf spaces and paracompact spaces. In a para-Lindelöf space, every open cover has a locally countable open refinement, that is, one such that each point of the space has a neighborhood that intersects only countably many elements of the refinement. The spaces constructed by Navy are counterexamples to the conjecture that all para-Lindelöf spaces are paracompact. Some of her spaces are even normal Moore spaces under suitable set-theoretic assumptions. Since every metrizable space is paracompact, these are counterexamples to the normal Moore space conjecture.

Stephen Watson called Navy's construction "a rather general one that permitted quite a lot of latitude" and said, "No other way of getting para-Lindelöf is known. I don't think another way of getting para-Lindelöf is even possible—Navy's method looks quite canonical to me." In 1983, William Fleissner modified one of her spaces to be a normal Moore space under the assumption of a particular covering property. Fleissner's examples finally resolved the normal Moore space conjecture by showing that it requires large cardinal axioms.

== Career ==
After graduate school, Navy took a position as a visiting assistant professor in the mathematics department of Bucknell University in 1981. While they were living in Lewisburg, Pennsylvania, Holladay started a software company called Raised Dot Computing, focused on computer Braille technology. He was inspired by Navy's need for Braille translation to help with her math teaching. She was an important consultant for the company, helping with software ideas and testing products in her university work. In December 1981, Raised Dot Computing released its first major product, BRAILLE-EDIT, a word processor and two-way Braille translator program for the Apple II. Navy left the university in 1984 to work for the company, and the couple and the company moved back to Madison, Wisconsin in July 1984.

Navy applied her computer skills to improving Raised Dot Computing's assistive software, producing enhanced versions of BRAILLE-EDIT and utility programs to handle textbook-format Braille and other special formats. In 1985 they added a line of MS-DOS software, culminating in the company's most successful product, MegaDots. Released in August 1992 and maintained until 2016, MegaDots provided Braille translation and word processing for the PC. Raised Dot Computing was transferred in September 1998 to a Wisconsin nonprofit organization called Braille Planet, which was then bought out in August 1999 by Duxbury Systems. Navy and Holladay live in Westford, Massachusetts, and still work at Duxbury.

Navy is a member of the Braille Authority of North America, where she serves as a consultant to the Nemeth Code Technical Committee.
