= Braille technology =

Type of assistive technology

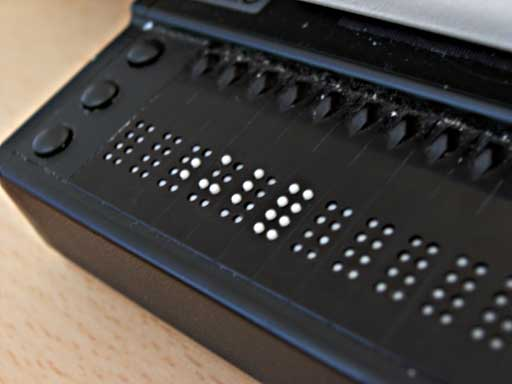
Refreshable Braille display

Braille technology is assistive technology which allows blind or visually impaired people to read, write, or manipulate braille electronically. This technology allows users to do common tasks such as writing, browsing the Internet, typing in Braille and printing in text, engaging in chat, downloading files and music, using electronic mail, burning music, and reading documents. It also allows blind or visually impaired students to complete all assignments in school as the rest of their sighted classmates and allows them to take courses online. It enables professionals to do their jobs and teachers to lecture using hardware and software applications. The advances in Braille technology are meaningful because blind people can access more texts, books, and libraries, and it also facilitates the printing of Braille texts.

"Despite the Braille system's universal reach, the National Federation of the Blind estimates that only 10 percent of the vision-impaired are able to read Braille".

== Software ==
Some of the software available currently:

- Duxbury DBT is a braille translation program that translates inkprint to braille and braille to inkprint for over 180 languages.
- BrailleBlaster is a free braille translation program created by the American Printing House for the Blind and available for Linux, Mac and Windows.
- JAWS, is a program that reads the words on the screen and enables the browsing of folders, documents and programs on Microsoft Windows. Words on the screen can also be sent to a Braille display.
- Kurzweil, a device that scans texts into the computer and narrates them.
- nvda, open source screen reading software with braille support.

== Hardware ==
- Braille display
- Braille keyboards, which were in use only with Braille typewriters. Braille reading computer users prefer the standard keyboard as a text composing input device. Braille computer keyboards are extremely rare.
- Braille embosser
- Braille notetakers
- Braille e-books, using electroactive polymers,

== See also ==
- Assistive technology
