= 2887 =

2887 may refer to:

- 2887 (number)
- U+2887, unicode for Braille pattern dots-1238
- Farm to Market Road 2887 in Runnels County, Texas
- 2887 Krinov, asteroid in the Flora mamily of the asteroid belt
