= Perkins Brailler =

Braille embossing typewriter

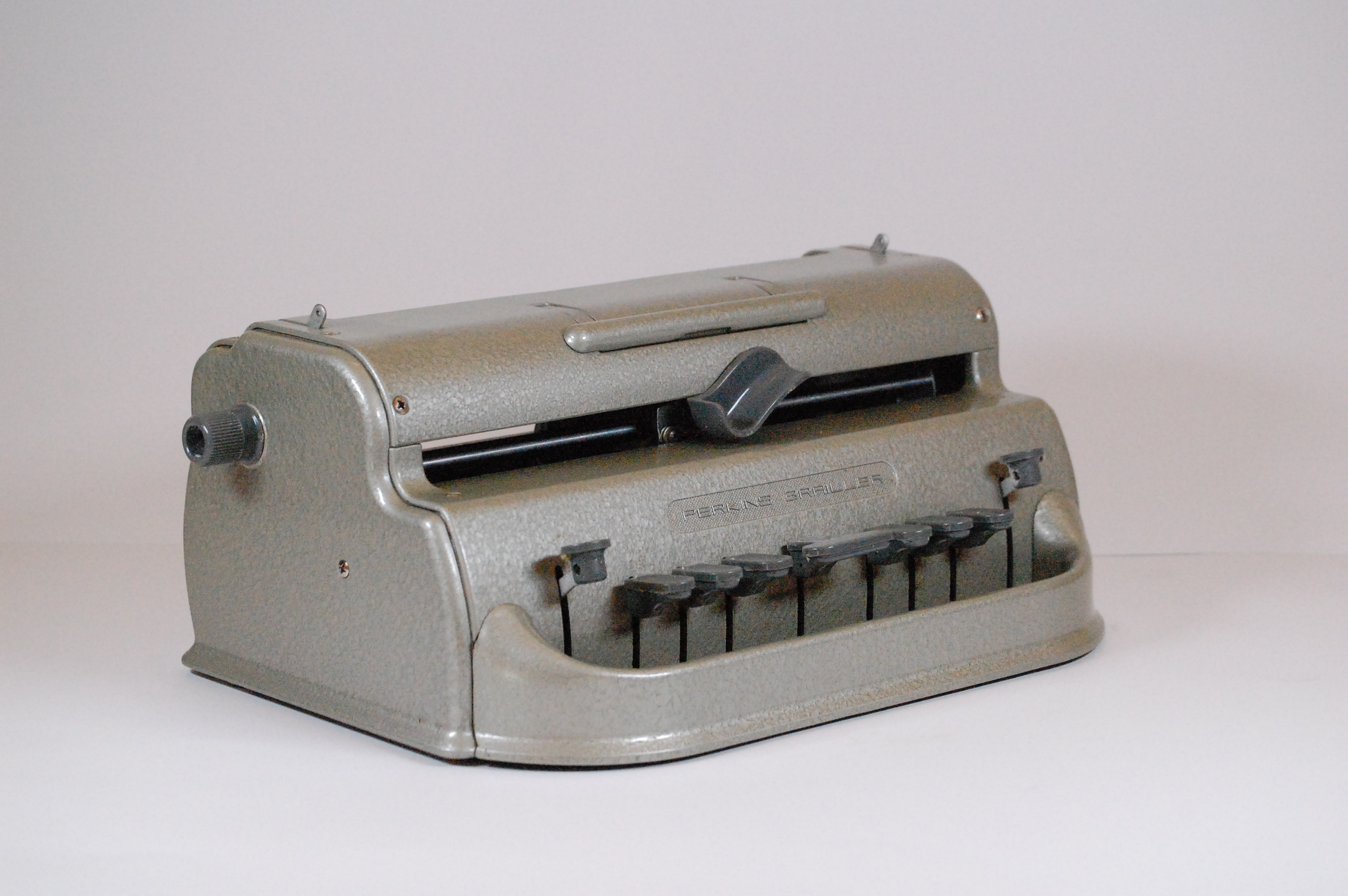
- The Perkins Brailler, designed by David Abraham
- Type: Braillewriter
- Inception: 1951
- Manufacturer: Perkins School for the Blind
- Models: Light Touch Brailler, SMART Brailler, Unimanual Perkins Brailler

Braille typewriter

The Perkins Brailler is a mechanical braillewriter designed by David Abraham and manufactured by Perkins School for the Blind. The first Perkins brailler was sold in 1951 and is still in production, with over 375,000 machines produced as of 2024. Similar to a mechanical typewriter, the brailler has a key corresponding to each of the six dots of the braille system, a space key, a backspace key, and an enter key (to advance to the next line), as well as has two side knobs, one on the right and one on the left, to advance paper through the machine. The rollers that hold and advance the paper have grooves designed to avoid crushing the raised dots that the brailler creates. A user can also adjust the left and right margins by moving the levers as needed on the back of the brailler.

== History ==
The first typewriter-style mechanical braillewriter was developed in 1892 by Frank Hall, then the superintendent of the Illinois Institution for the Education of the Blind. Perkins Institute of Boston developed their own braillewriter, the Perkins Model A Braillewriter, in 1907. Early braillewriters were machined by hand and thus offered inconsistent performance and were difficult to repair; the Model A and its successors were discontinued in 1931 with the aim of developing a better braillewriter.

The director of the Perkins School for the Blind, Gabriel Farrell, asked industrial arts teacher David Abraham to create an inexpensive and reliable machine to allow students to more easily write braille. Farrell and Abraham worked with Edward Waterhouse, who was a math teacher at Perkins, to create the design for the brailler. The prototype was built by Abraham in 1941, but did not go into production until 1951 due to manufacturing restrictions during World War II.

The brailler is also manufactured in large-cell (jumbo) and unimanual (one-handed) variants. Although the design of the original brailler remains unchanged, a lighter and quieter version intended for students, the Next Generation brailler, was developed and launched in 2008. The new model won the Silver Award in the 2009 International Design Excellence Awards, but received a mixed response from braille users. It was replaced by the SMART Brailler in 2012.

=== Legacy ===
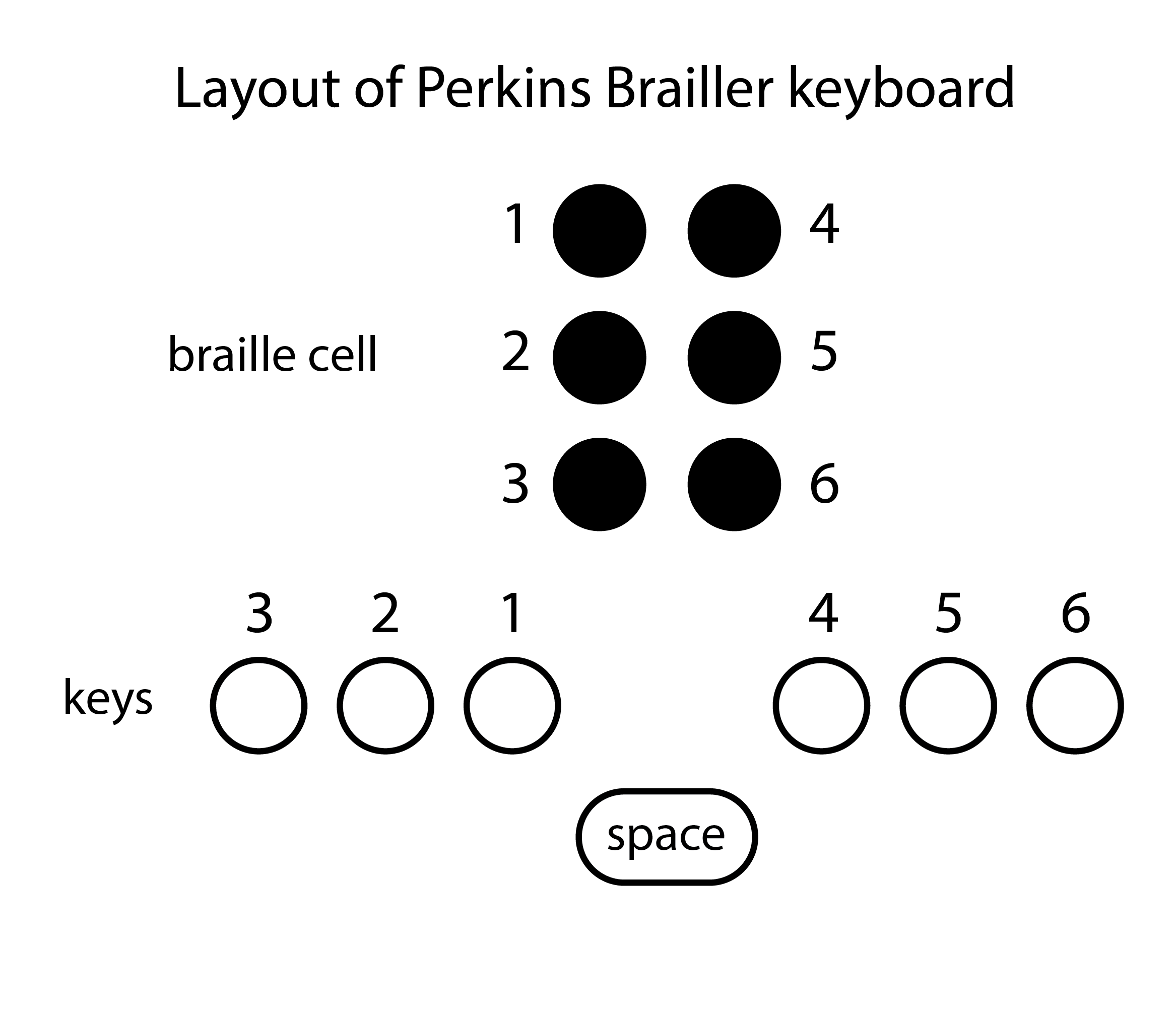
Layout of Perkins brailler keys

Although the Perkins brailler was not the first to use the six-key layout where the left index finger sits on the key for dot 1, the design is sometimes referred to as the "Perkins layout" or "Perkins keyboard", and is commonly used in other braille devices such as notetakers.

== Design ==
The Perkins brailler has six keys corresponding to the dots of a braille cell, a space bar, a carriage return (enter) key, and a backspace key. Like a traditional typewriter, a mistyped letter must be erased by hand using a braille eraser and then re-brailled. A bell indicates to the user when they are approaching the end of the line.

The paper placement is achieved by rolling the paper onto an internal drum, unrolling it when the user presses a line-feed key, and using a clock-like escapement to move an embossing carriage over the paper. A system of six cams consisting of rods with a square cross-section transfers keystrokes to the wire-like styli contained in the carriage. Tolerances are close, and the buildup of oily dirt with normal use necessitates periodic cleaning and adjustment.

== See also ==
- Mountbatten Brailler
- Book
- E-book
- Braille e-book
- Braille translator
- Braille embosser
