= WIMATS =

Braille script application

WIMATS is an application software to transcribe mathematical and scientific text input into braille script in braille presses. Based on the Nemeth Code, the output can be printed in a variety of braille embossers. This transcription software was jointly developed by Webel Mediatronics Limited (WML) and International Council for Education of People with Visual Impairment (ICEVI), and was officially launched on 17 July 2006.

WIMATS support inputs of arithmetic, algebra, geometry, trigonometry, calculus, vector, set notations and Greek alphabets. The graphical user interface is user friendly, and training does not take a long time. This software fulfills a need for the availability of mathematics and science study materials at the higher secondary and college level for visually impaired persons.

ICEVI has a presence in 185 countries; the software, developed jointly with WML, is made available through ICEVI.
