= Holladay (surname) =

Holladay is a surname. Notable people with the surname include:

- Albert L. Holladay (1805–1856), American Presbyterian minister and educator
- Alexander Holladay (1811–1877), American politician and lawyer
- Alexander Q. Holladay (1839–1909), American politician and lawyer
- Ben Holladay (1819–1887), American transportation businessman
- Chloe Holladay, American majorette
- David Holladay (1954–2024), American computer programmer
- John Holladay (1798–1862), American pioneer
- Terry Holladay (born 1955), American tennis player
- Wilhelmina Holladay (1922–2021), American art collector and patron
