= National Braille Press =

Braille publisher in Boston, MA

The National Braille Press
- Status: Active
- Founded: 1927
- Founder: Francis Ierardi
- Country of origin: United States
- Headquarters location: Boston
- Distribution: Nationwide
- Publication types: Books, Magazines, other printed works
- Nonfiction topics: All
- Fiction genres: All
- No. of employees: 45
- Official website: www.nbp.org

The National Braille Press is a braille publisher in Boston, MA. It prints and publishes braille works in numerous forms. It publishes a magazine for blind or visually impaired readers and runs a children's book club. The press has experienced a period of decline due to an overall shift away from reading braille.

== History and operations ==
The National Braille Press was founded in 1927, originally as a weekly newspaper. It was founded by Francis Ierardi, a blind Italian immigrant, to increase access to news about braille. It is a non-profit publisher of braille books. Prior to 1982, The National Braille Press only produced braille books through contract printing. However, the press began to publish and sell its own books in 1982, which allowed braille readers to purchase books directly from The National Braille Press, making it the first braille press in the United States to do so.

The focus of The National Braille Press is to support blind authors and publish their work for readers who are also blind. At its current location, the National Braille Press carries out all its "own editing, plate making, proofreading, printing, and mai]ing operations". It mostly produces printed texts such as books, magazines, textbooks, and manuals, but they do make other forms of braille materials as well. The National Braille Press uses various plate-embossing devices to produce the works it publishes, including an Heidelberg printing press and an electronic embosser.

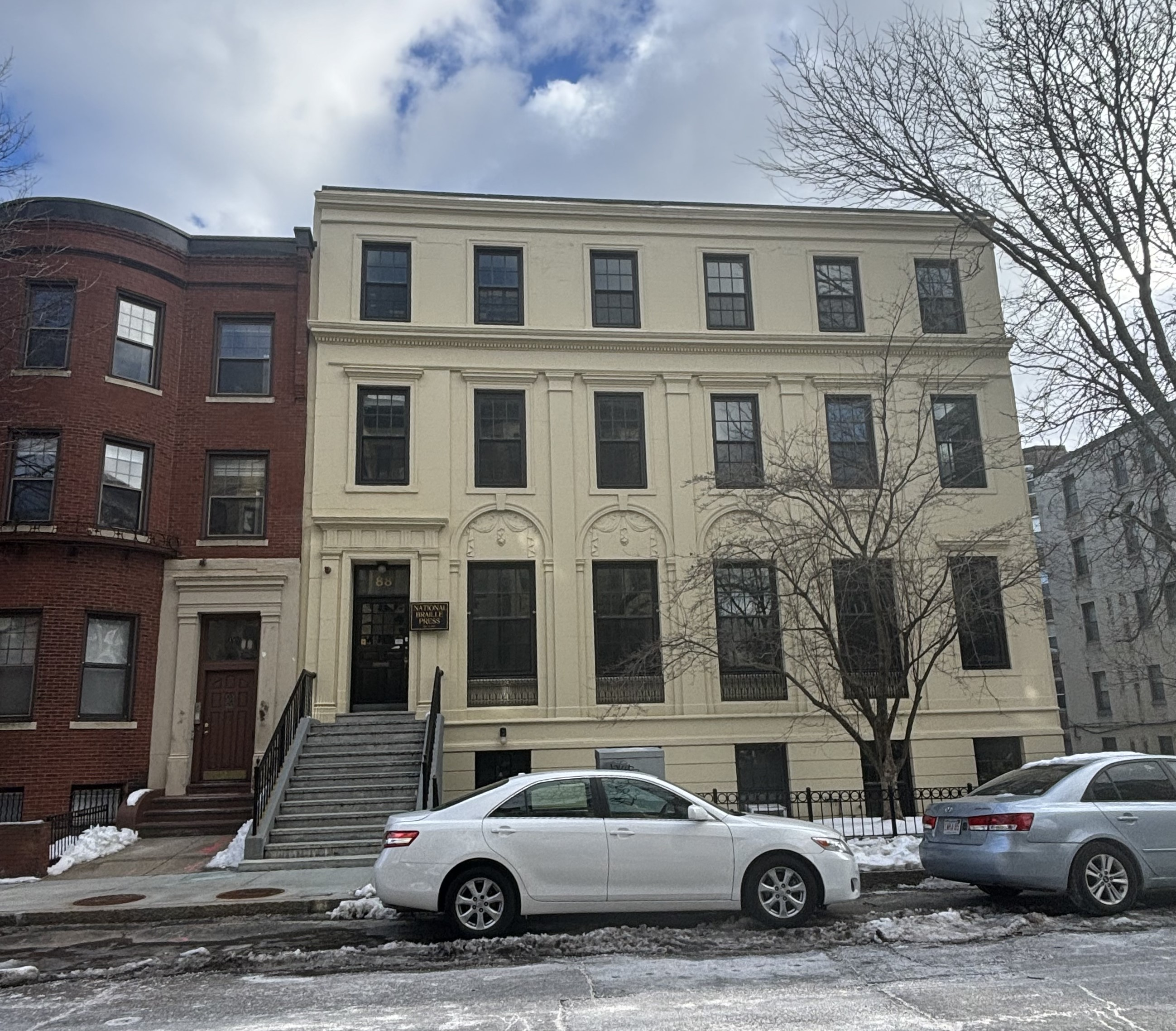
The National Braille Press' building

== Building ==
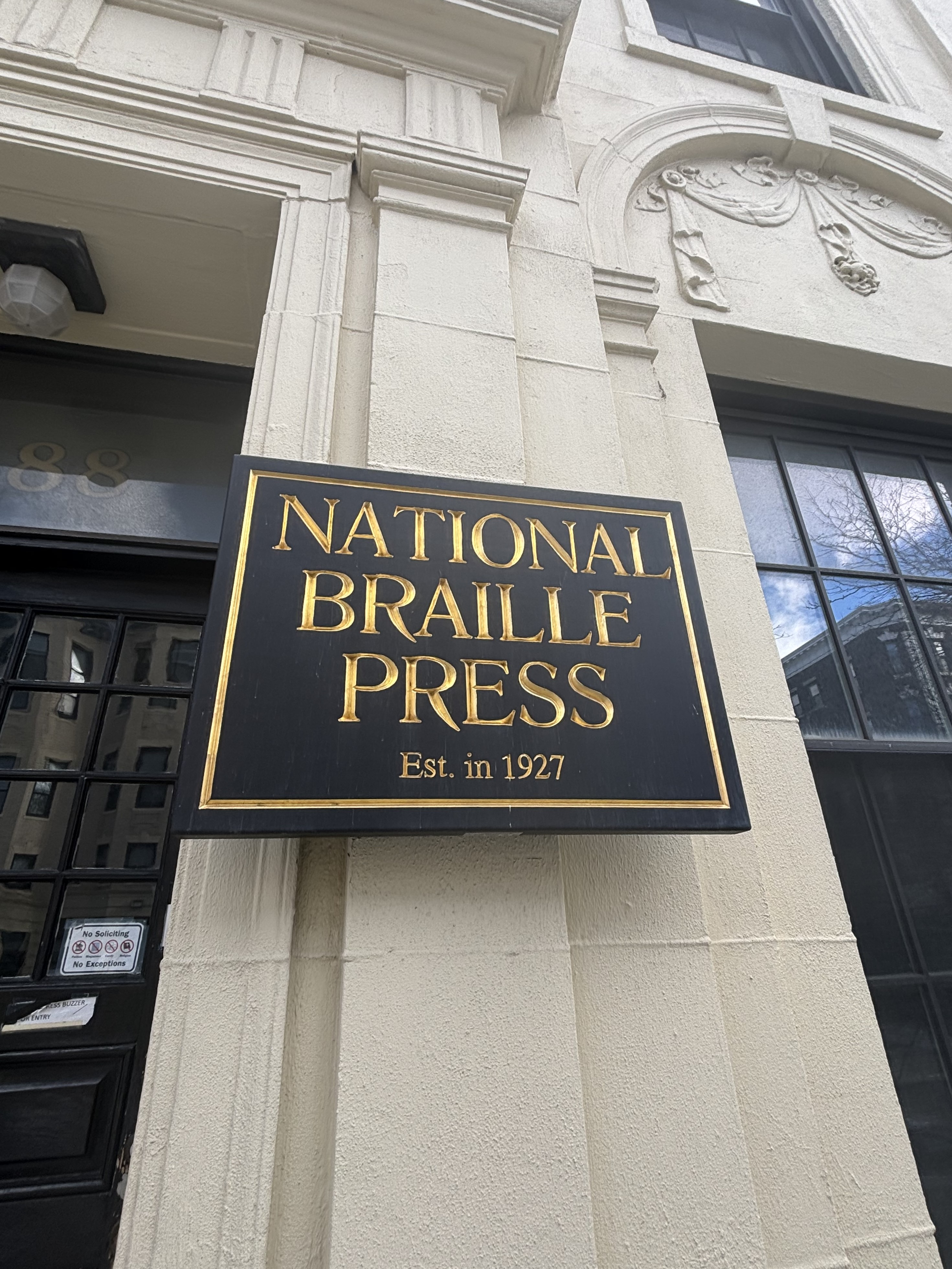
National Braille Press' Sign

The National Braille Press is located in Boston, MA. In 1946, it moved into its current location in the Fenway/Kenmore neighborhood. It is currently housed in a 4-story building that sits on St Stephens St., just between Opera Pl. and Gainsborough St. The home of the National Braille Press is the same building as a former piano factory. This building contains offices on the upper floors and printing machines in the basement. It has many historical features, such as the "1950s-vintage frosted-glass partitions," which can be seen in the upstairs offices.

== Programming ==
The National Braille Press's magazine is called Our Special, and fates from 1930, with a target audience of visually impaired women. Children's braille books are distributed around the country monthly. The press partners with the Massachusetts Commission for the Blind's internship program, which hires visually impaired interns. Fundraising accounts for 30% of the Press' income, and has included partnerships with the Boston Marathon.

In recent years, there has been a decline in the need for braille printed works, due to an increase in blind children entering public schools, which do not necessarily teach braille, rather than specialized schools. This occurrence has resulted in the press also experiencing a phase of decline.

=== Notable published works ===
- New American Bible
- Harry Potter and the Goblet of Fire
- The Joy of Cooking
- Goodnight Moon
