= Braille watch =

Watch for people with visual impairment

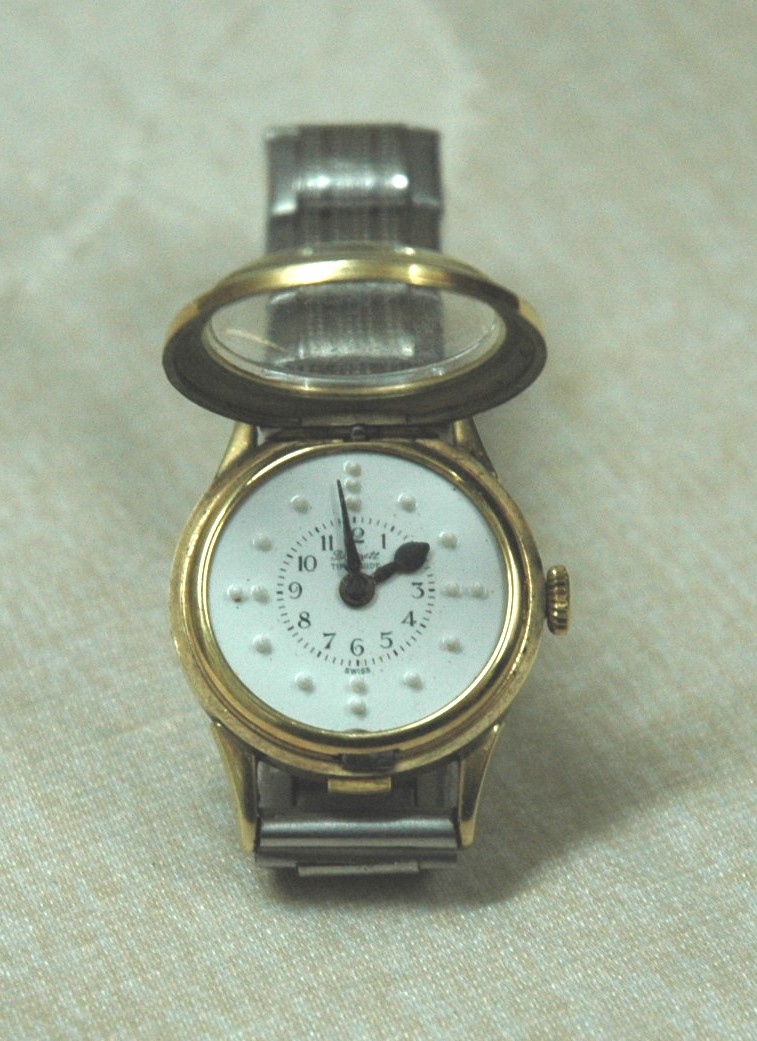
A braille watch

A braille watch is a portable timepiece used by blind or visually impaired people.

== Description ==
Braille watch is used by touching the dial and noticing the embossments. Both analog and digital versions are available. The analog versions have a protective glass or crystal cover that is flipped open when time needs to be read and the clock-hands are constructed to not be susceptible to movement at the mere touch of the finger that a blind person uses to observe their positions. In the digital form, the dots (like braille script) keep changing position as time changes. In this case, one must understand the Braille alphabet to read the watch.

Electronic talking watches, which speak the time at the touch of a button, are also popular among people who are blind.
