= Mountbatten Brailler =

Brand of electronic Braille typewriter

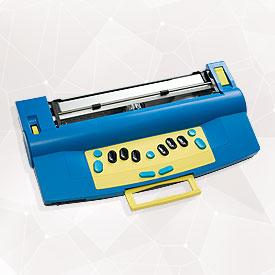
A Mountbatten Brailler

The Mountbatten Brailler is an electronic machine used to type braille on braille paper. It uses the traditional "braille typewriter keyboard" of the Perkins Brailler with modern technology, giving it a number of additional features such as word processing, audio feedback and embossing. The machine was pioneered and developed at the United Kingdom's Royal National College for the Blind in Hereford by Ernest Bate.

Initially the Mountbatten was manufactured in Australia. On 1 January 2010, manufacture of the Mountbatten was taken over by Polish company Harpo Sp. z o. o.

The Mountbatten was developed after Lord Mountbatten left a bequest in his will for the development of a modern, low cost, portable brailler. It has been available since 1991.

Like the Perkins, the Mountbatten has a key corresponding to each of the six dots of the braille code. By simultaneously pressing different combinations of the six keys, users can create any of the characters in the braille code. In addition to these six keys, the Mountbatten has a space key, a backspace key, and a new line key. Like a manual typewriter, it has a knob to advance paper through the machine, although unlike the Perkins the bar does not move. There is a Return key rather than a carriage return lever. The rollers that hold and advance the paper have grooves designed to avoid crushing the raised dots the brailler creates.

In addition to the traditional keyboard, the Mountbatten has several other features. These include memory which allows braille text files to be stored in much the same way as is done with a word processor, speech feedback allowing the user to listen to the text they have just typed or from files, and forward and back translation between text and braille. The Mountbatten can be connected to a printer allowing files to be printed as text, while a regular PC keyboard can be connected to the Mountbatten enabling text to be produced as contracted or uncontracted braille.

There are several models of the Mountbatten; the basic Mountbatten Writer, the Mountbatten Writer Plus, the Mountbatten Pro, and the Mountbatten Learning System.
