= David Holladay =

American computer programmer (1953–2024)

- Born: September 17, 1953; San Andreas, California
- Died: February 15, 2024 (aged 70); Westford, Massachusetts
- Spouse: Caryn Navy

David Holladay (September 17, 1953 – February 15, 2024) was an American computer programmer who worked on early Braille translator word processing software allowing blind Apple Computer users to enter, edit, and translate text.

== Early life and education ==
Holladay was born in San Andreas, California to William Lee Holladay and Jean Grosbach and was raised alongside his elder sister and 2 younger brothers. He received some of his early education at the American Community School Beirut, and in Leiden while his father was receiving a PhD from Leiden University in Holland. He graduated from Newton North High School in Massachusetts in 1971. He is a graduate of MIT with a Bachelor of Science degree in electrical engineering. He met Caryn Navy at MIT and they were married on January 2, 1977. The couple had two adopted children.

Navy attended graduate school at the University of Wisconsin–Madison and Holladay worked as a computer programmer for the University of Wisconsin. When Navy got a teaching position at Bucknell University in Lewisburg, the couple moved and Holladay started working on his home-based programming work.

== Career ==
Holladay started a software company called Raised Dot Computing, focused on computer Braille technology in 1981, inspired by his spouse Caryn Navy's need for Braille translation to help with her math teaching. He contacted Apple Computer to get access to their operating system so that he could create software to help an Apple computer interface with Navy's VersaBraille system. Raised Dot sent out a newsletter which was distributed all over the world on cassette and discussed innovations in their software, as well as other advances in accessible computing at the time.

In December 1981, Raised Dot Computing released its first major product, BRAILLE-EDIT, a word processor and two-way Braille translator program for the Apple II. The company moved back to Madison, Wisconsin in July 1984.

Raised Dot Computing's assistive software produced enhanced versions of BRAILLE-EDIT and other utility programs to handle textbook-format Braille and other special formats. He supported production of print math from Nemeth Code mathematics braille. In 1985 they added a line of MS-DOS software, culminating in the company's most successful product, MegaDots. The company received a $250,000 National Science Foundation Innovative Research Grant in 1989. Released in August 1992, MegaDots provided Braille translation and word processing for the PC, for people using popular programs such as Word Perfect or MS Word. Raised Dot Computing was reorganized in September 1998 to a Wisconsin nonprofit organization called Braille Planet, which was acquired August 1999 by Duxbury Systems.

Navy and Holladay lived in Westford, Massachusetts, and continued work at Duxbury after the acquisition.
