= Braille =

Tactile writing system

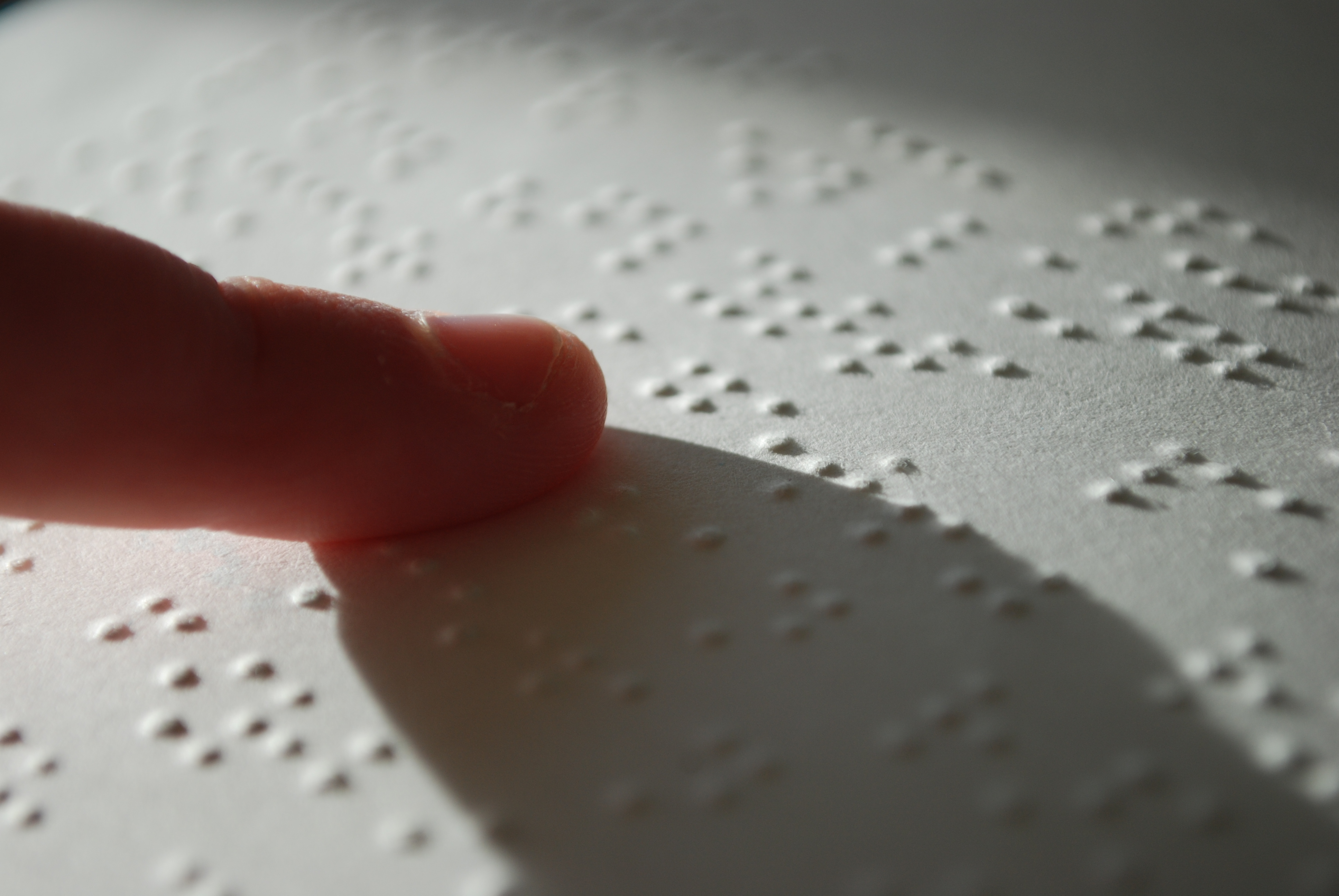
- Script type: Alphabet (nonlinear)
- Creator: Louis Braille
- Period: 1834–present
- Direction: Left-to-right, right-to-left script
- Languages: 133 languages

Related scripts
- Parent systems: Night writing: Early braille; Braille
- Child systems: See Category:French-ordered braille alphabets, Fakoo
- Sister systems: New York Point

ISO 15924
- ISO 15924: Brai (570), Braille

Unicode
- Unicode alias: Braille
- Unicode range: U+2800–U+28FF

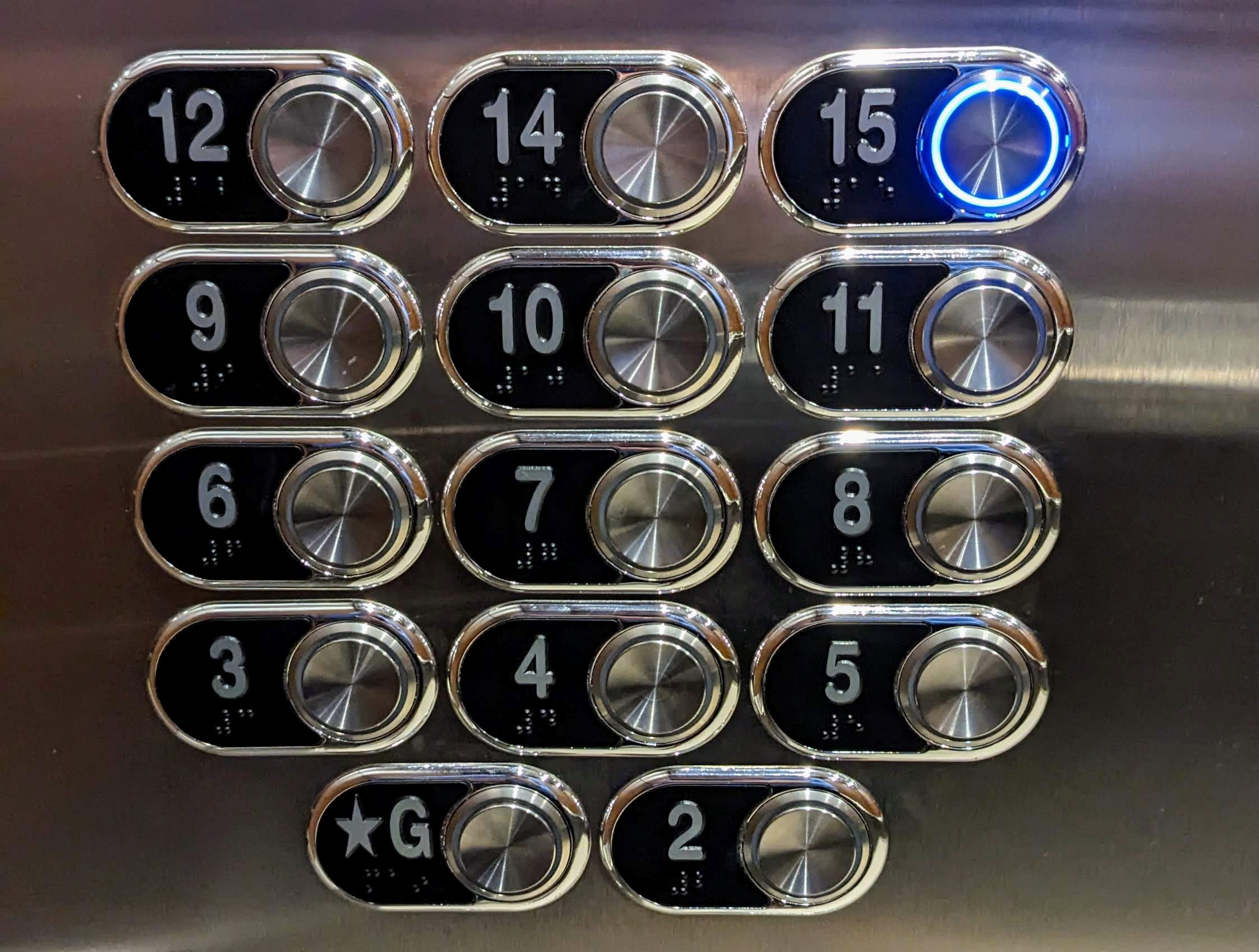
Accessibility Braille dashboard in elevator

Braille (/breɪl/ BRAYL; French: [bʁaj]) is a tactile writing system used by blind or visually impaired people. It can be read either on embossed paper or by using refreshable braille displays that connect to computers and smartphone devices. Braille can be written using a slate and stylus, a braille writer, an electronic braille notetaker or with the use of a computer connected to a braille embosser. For blind readers, braille is an independent writing system, rather than a code of printed orthography.

Braille is named after its creator, Louis Braille, a Frenchman who lost his sight as a result of a childhood accident. In 1824, at the age of fifteen, he developed the braille code based on the French alphabet as an improvement on night writing. He published his system, which subsequently included musical notation, in 1829. The second revision, published in 1837, was the first binary form of writing developed in the modern era.

Braille characters are formed using a combination of six raised (Note: This article uses the term "raised" as a synonym for "embossed". In conventional (two-dimensional) typography, "raised" usually refers to placing a glyph higher on the page than a normal letter would go, like how the masculine ordinal indicator º is a raised latin letter o. However, that sense of the word "raised" is never used by this page, and the term "raised" here means physically bumping out of the plane of the page. Both meanings of the word "raised" in the context of text are valid, and they are usually distinguished purely by context. For example, chapter 21 of the Unicode standard uses the word "raised" in the context of Braille to mean embossed and in the context of shorthand to mean placing higher on the page. The Unicode standard also refers to these "raised" Braille dots as "tangible" and "set".) dots arranged in a 3 × 2 matrix, called the braille cell. The number and arrangement of these dots distinguishes one character from another. Since the various braille alphabets originated as transcription codes for printed writing, the mappings (sets of character designations) vary from language to language, and even within one; in English braille there are three levels: uncontracted – a letter-by-letter transcription used for basic literacy; contracted – an addition of abbreviations and contractions used as a space-saving mechanism; and grade 3 – various non-standardized personal stenographies that are less commonly used.

In addition to braille text (letters, punctuation, contractions), it is also possible to create embossed illustrations and graphs, with the lines either solid or made of series of dots, arrows, and bullets that are larger than braille dots. A full braille cell includes six raised dots arranged in two columns, each column having three dots. The dot positions are identified by numbers from one to six. There are 64 possible combinations, including no dots at all for a word space. Dot configurations can be used to represent a letter, digit, punctuation mark, or even a word.

Early braille education is crucial to literacy, education and employment among the blind. Despite the evolution of new technologies, including screen reader software that reads information aloud, braille provides blind people with access to spelling, punctuation and other aspects of written language less accessible through audio alone.

While some have suggested that audio-based technologies will decrease the need for braille, technological advancements such as braille displays have continued to make braille more accessible and available. Braille users highlight that braille remains as essential as print is to the sighted.

== History ==
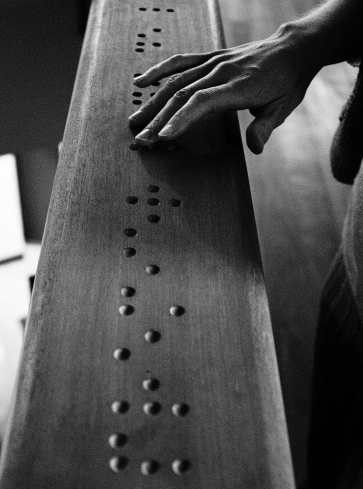
The Braille code ⠏⠗⠑⠍⠊⠑⠗ where the word premier, French for "first", can be read

Braille was based on a tactile code, now known as night writing, developed by Charles Barbier. The name "night writing" was later given when it was considered as a means for soldiers to communicate silently without a light source. Barbier's writings do not use this term, instead suggesting that braille was originally designed as a simpler form of writing for the visually impaired. In Barbier's system, sets of 12 embossed dots were used to encode 36 different sounds. Braille identified three major defects of the code: first, the symbols represented phonetic sounds and not letters of the alphabet – thus the code was unable to render the orthography of the words. Second, the 12-dot symbols could not easily fit beneath the pad of the reading finger. This required the reading finger to move in order to perceive the whole symbol, which slowed the reading process. (This was because Barbier's system was based only on the number of dots in each of two 6-dot columns, not the pattern of the dots.) Third, the code did not include symbols for numerals or punctuation. Braille's solution was to use 6-dot cells and to assign a specific pattern to each letter of the alphabet. Braille also developed symbols for representing numerals and punctuation.

At first, braille was a one-to-one transliteration of the French alphabet, but soon various abbreviations (contractions) and even logograms were developed, creating a system much more like shorthand.

Today, there are braille codes for over 133 languages.

In English, some variations in the braille codes have traditionally existed among English-speaking countries. In 1991, work to standardize the braille codes used in the English-speaking world began. Unified English Braille (UEB) has been adopted in all seven member countries of the International Council on English Braille (ICEB) as well as Nigeria.

=== Derivation ===
Braille is derived from the Latin alphabet, albeit indirectly. In Braille's original system, the dot patterns were assigned to letters according to their position within the alphabetic order of the French alphabet of the time, with accented letters and w sorted at the end.

Unlike print, which consists of mostly arbitrary symbols, the braille alphabet follows a logical sequence. The first ten letters of the alphabet, a–j, use the upper four dot positions: ⠁⠃⠉⠙⠑⠋⠛⠓⠊⠚ (filled circles in the table below). These stand for the ten digits 1–9 and 0 in an alphabetic numeral system similar to Greek numerals (as well as derivations of it, including Hebrew numerals, Cyrillic numerals, Abjad numerals, also Hebrew gematria and Greek isopsephy).

Though the dots are assigned in no obvious order, the cells with the fewest dots are assigned to the first three letters (and lowest digits), abc = 123 (⠁⠃⠉), and to the three vowels in this part of the alphabet, aei (⠁⠑⠊), whereas the even digits 4, 6, 8, 0 (⠙⠋⠓⠚) are right angles.

The next ten letters, k–t, are identical to a–j respectively, apart from the addition of a dot at position 3 (red dots in the bottom left corners of the cells in the table below): ⠅⠇⠍⠝⠕⠏⠟⠗⠎⠞:

Derivation (coloured dots) of the 26 braille letters of the basic Latin alphabet from the 10 numeric digits (filled circles)
a/1	b/2	c/3	d/4	e/5	f/6	g/7	h/8	i/9	j/0
k	l	m	n	o	p	q	r	s	t
u	v	x	y	z					w

The next ten letters (the next "decade") are the same again, but with dots also at both position 3 and position 6 (green dots in the bottom rows of the cells in the table above). Here w was left out as it was not part of the official French alphabet in Braille's time; the French order of the decade was u v x y z ç é à è ù (⠥⠧⠭⠽⠵⠯⠿⠷⠮⠾). (Note: The values of the Latin letters after z differ from language to language; these are Braille's assignments for rendering French.)

The next ten letters, ending in w, are the same again, except that for this series position 6 (purple dot in the bottom right corner of the cell in the table above) is used without a dot at position 3. In French braille these are the letters â ê î ô û ë ï ü œ w (⠡⠣⠩⠹⠱⠫⠻⠳⠪⠺). W had been tacked onto the end of 39 letters of the French alphabet to accommodate English.

The a–j series shifted down by one dot space (⠂⠆⠒⠲⠢⠖⠶⠦⠔⠴) is used for punctuation. Letters a ⠁ and c ⠉, which only use dots in the top row, were shifted two places for the apostrophe and hyphen: ⠄⠤. (These are also the decade diacritics, on the left in the table below, of the second and third decade.)

In addition, there are ten patterns that are based on the first two letters (⠁⠃) with their dots shifted to the right; these were assigned to non-French letters (ì ä ò ⠌⠜⠬), or serve non-letter functions: ⠈ (superscript; in English the accent mark), ⠘ (currency prefix), ⠨ (capital, in English the decimal point), ⠼ (number sign), ⠸ (emphasis mark), ⠐ (symbol prefix).

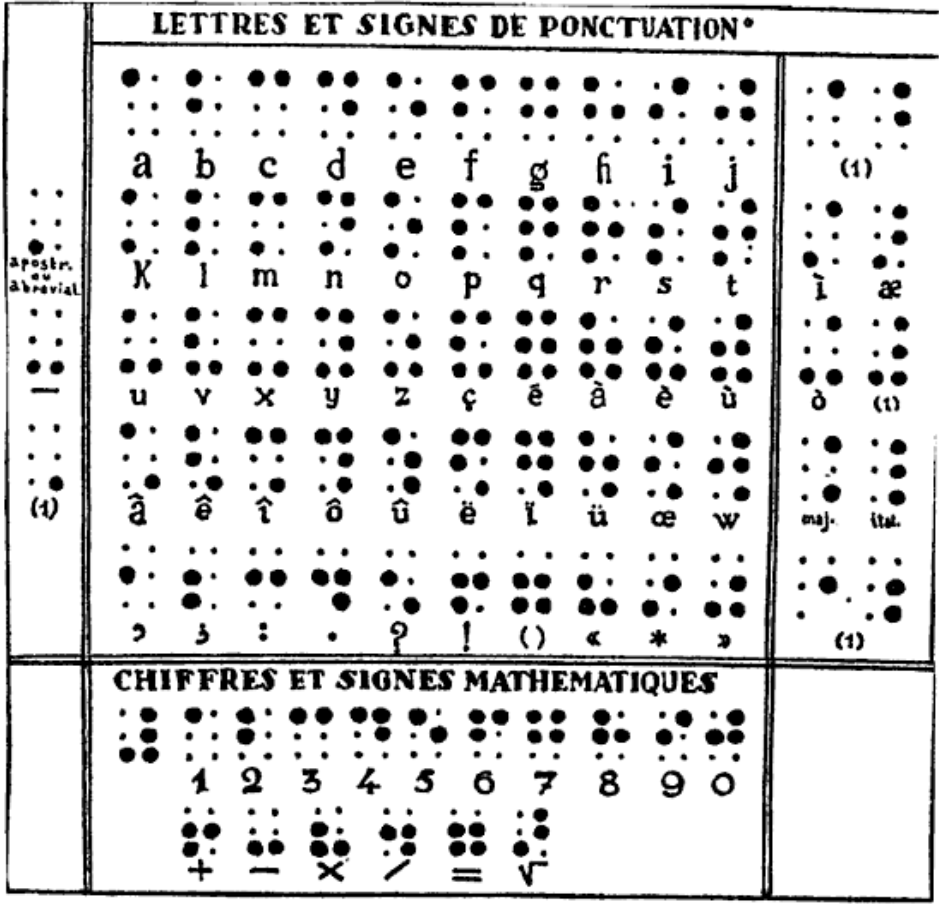
The 64 modern braille cells (Note: The final form of Braille's alphabet, according to Henri (1952). "(1)" indicates markers for musical and mathematical notation. The characters here have been arranged by decade, with the decade diacritics listed on the left, and supplementary characters listed on the right according to their diacritic. See 1829 braille, where the 12 characters listed in the first line are used for shorthand and are found in this order for the 12 notes of plainsong notation, and French Braille, where the "final" form of Braille's alphabet is laid out in the same way. However, modern tables often organize the supplementary characters differently: those with a dot 3 are listed as a 6th decade of 6 characters, and those with dots only on the right side are listed as a 7th decade of 7 characters, without anything in common with the characters listed above them in those columns.)
decade		numeric sequence									shift right	
1st												
2nd	' (apostrophe)											
3rd	- (hyphen)											# (number)
4th	UPPERCASE (capital)										. (decimal point)	
5th	shift down	, (comma)	; (semicolon)	: (colon)	. (period)	? (question mark)	! (exclamation point)	“ (quote open)	* (asterisk)	” (quote close)		

The first four decades are similar in that the numeric sequence is extended by adding the decade dots, whereas in the fifth decade it is extended by shifting it downward.

Originally there had been nine decades. The fifth through ninth used dashes as well as dots, but they proved to be impractical to distinguish by touch under normal conditions and were soon abandoned. From the beginning, these additional decades could be substituted with what we now know as the number sign (⠼) applied to the earlier decades, though that only caught on for the digits (the old 5th decade being replaced by ⠼ applied to the 1st decade). The dash occupying the top row of the original sixth decade was simply omitted, producing the modern fifth decade. (See 1829 braille.)

=== Assignment ===
Historically, there have been three principles in assigning the values of a linear script (print) to Braille: Using Louis Braille's original French letter values; reassigning the braille letters according to the sort order of the print alphabet being transcribed; and reassigning the letters to improve the efficiency of writing in braille.

Under international consensus, most braille alphabets follow the French sorting order for the 26 letters of the basic Latin alphabet, and there have been attempts at unifying the letters beyond these 26 (see international braille), though differences remain, for example, in German Braille. This unification avoids the chaos of each nation reordering the braille code to match the sorting order of its print alphabet, as happened in Algerian Braille, where braille codes were numerically reassigned to match the order of the Arabic alphabet and bear little relation to the values used in other countries (compare modern Arabic Braille, which uses the French sorting order), and as happened in an early American version of English Braille, where the letters w, x, y, z were reassigned to match English alphabetical order. A convention sometimes seen for letters beyond the basic 26 is to exploit the physical symmetry of braille patterns iconically, for example, by assigning a reversed n to ñ or an inverted s to sh. (See Hungarian Braille and Bharati Braille, which do this to some extent.)

A third principle was to assign braille codes according to frequency, with the simplest patterns (quickest ones to write with a stylus) assigned to the most frequent letters of the alphabet. Such frequency-based alphabets were used in Germany and the United States in the 19th century (see American Braille), but with the invention of the braille typewriter their advantage disappeared, and none are attested in modern use – they had the disadvantage that the resulting small number of dots in a text interfered with following the alignment of the letters, and consequently made texts more difficult to read than Braille's more arbitrary letter assignment. Finally, there are braille scripts that do not order the codes numerically at all, such as Japanese Braille and Korean Braille, which are based on more abstract principles of syllable composition.

Texts are sometimes written in a script of eight dots per cell rather than six, enabling them to encode a greater number of symbols. (See Gardner–Salinas braille codes.) Luxembourgish Braille has adopted eight-dot cells for general use; for example, accented letters take the unaccented versions plus dot 8.

== Form ==
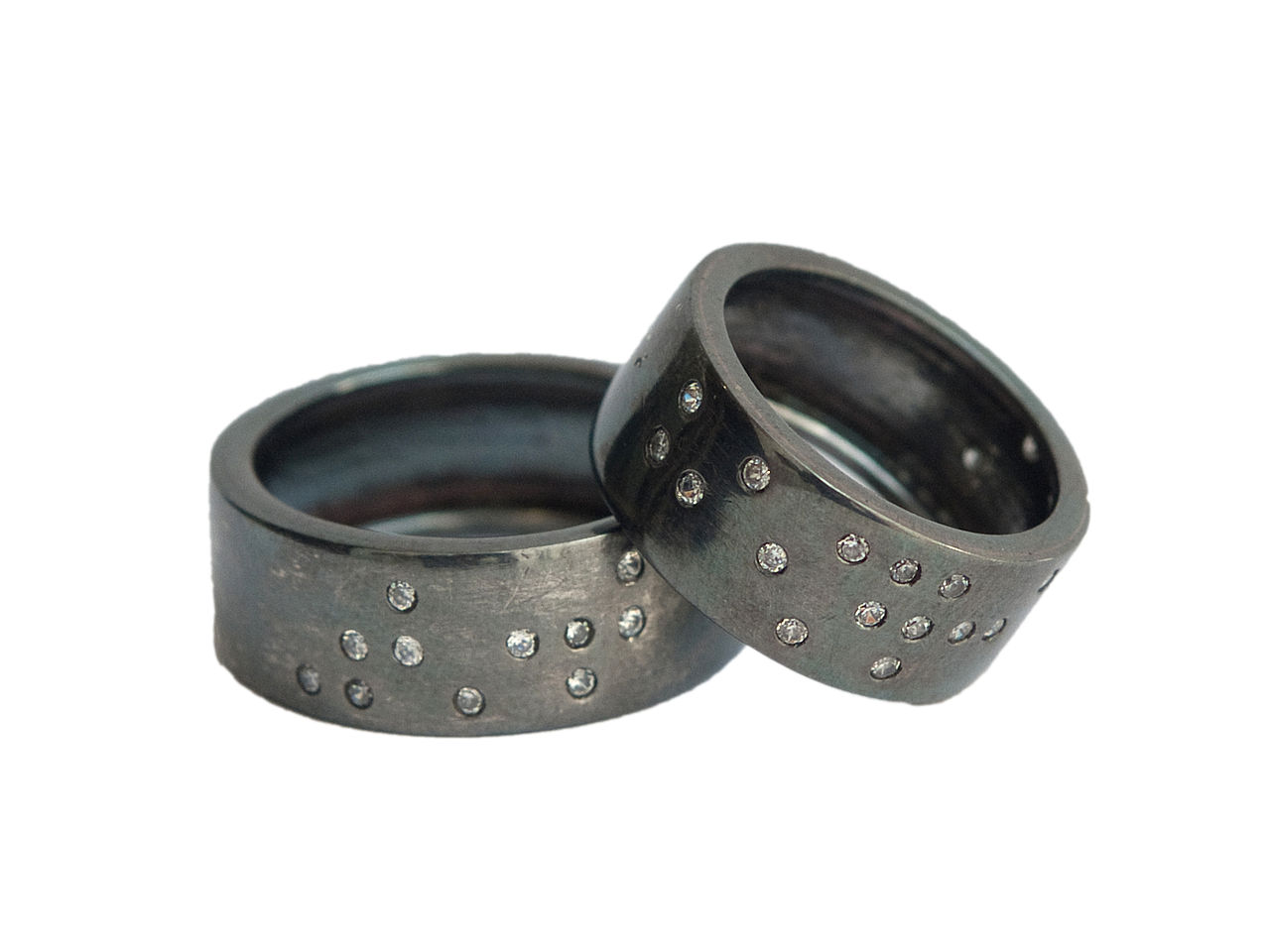
Silver wedding bands with names Henri(que) and Tita written in braille

Braille was the first writing system with binary encoding. The system as devised by Braille consists of two parts:

1. Character encoding that mapped characters of the French alphabet to tuples of six bits (the dots).
2. The physical representation of those six-bit characters with raised dots in a braille cell.

Within an individual cell, the dot positions are arranged in two columns of three positions. A raised dot can appear in any of the six positions, producing 64 (2^{6}) possible patterns, including one in which there are no raised dots. For reference purposes, a pattern is commonly described by listing the positions where dots are raised, the positions being universally numbered, from top to bottom, as 1 to 3 on the left and 4 to 6 on the right. For example, dot pattern 1-3-4 describes a cell with three dots raised, at the top and bottom in the left column and at the top of the right column: that is, the letter ⠍ m. The lines of horizontal braille text are separated by a space, much like visible printed text, so that the dots of one line can be differentiated from the braille text above and below. Different assignments of braille codes (or code pages) are used to map the character sets of different printed scripts to the six-bit cells. Braille assignments have also been created for mathematical and musical notation. However, because the six-dot braille cell allows only 64 (2^{6}) patterns, including space, the characters of a braille script commonly have multiple values, depending on their context. That is, character mapping between print and braille is not one-to-one. For example, the character ⠙ corresponds in print to both the letter d and the digit 4.

In addition to simple encoding, many braille alphabets use contractions to reduce the size of braille texts and to increase reading speed. (See Contracted braille.)

== Writing ==
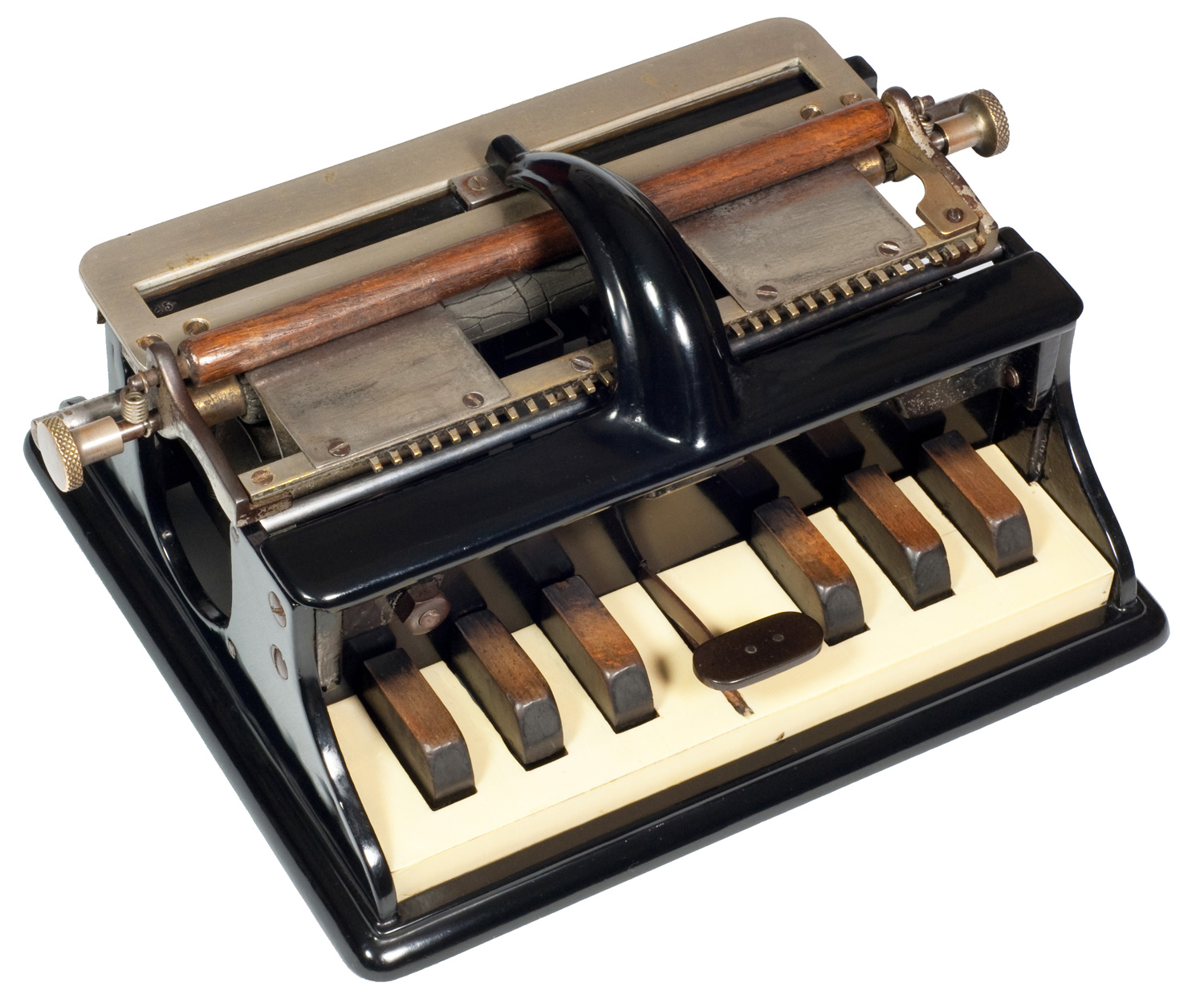
Hall Braille writer, model 1 (1892)

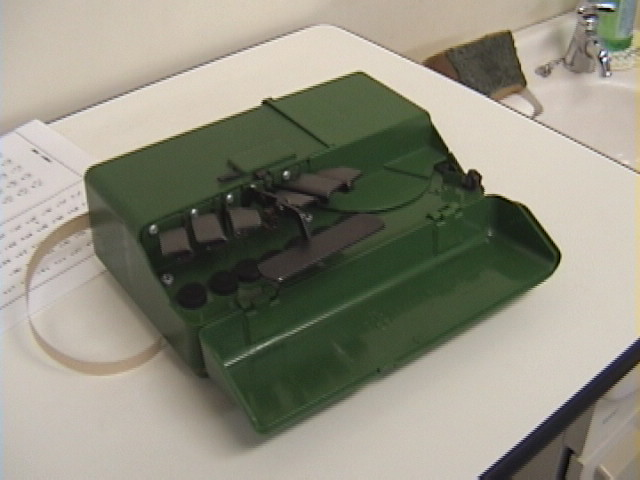
Braille typewriter

Braille may be produced by hand using a slate and stylus in which each dot is created from the back of the page, writing in mirror image, or it may be produced on a braille typewriter or Perkins Brailler, or an electronic Brailler or braille notetaker. Braille users with access to smartphones may also activate the on-screen braille input keyboard, to type braille symbols on to their device by placing their fingers on to the screen according to the dot configuration of the symbols they wish to form. These symbols are automatically translated into print on the screen. The different tools that exist for writing braille allow the braille user to select the method that is best for a given task. For example, the slate and stylus is a portable writing tool, much like the pen and paper for the sighted. Errors can be erased using a braille eraser or can be overwritten with all six dots (⠿). Interpoint refers to braille printing that is offset, so that the paper can be embossed on both sides, with the dots on one side appearing between the divots that form the dots on the other. Using a computer or other electronic device, Braille may be produced with a braille embosser (printer) or a refreshable braille display (screen).

=== Eight-dot braille ===
Braille has been extended to an 8-dot code, particularly for use with braille embossers and refreshable braille displays. In 8-dot braille the additional dots are added at the bottom of the cell, giving a matrix 4 dots high by 2 dots wide. The additional dots are given the numbers 7 (for the lower-left dot) and 8 (for the lower-right dot). Eight-dot braille has the advantages that the casing of each letter is coded in the cell and that every printable ASCII character can be encoded in a single cell. All 256 (2^{8}) possible combinations of 8 dots are encoded by the Unicode standard. Braille with six dots is frequently stored as Braille ASCII.

=== Letters ===
The first 25 braille letters, up through the first half of the 3rd decade, transcribe a–z (skipping w). In English Braille, the rest of that decade is rounded out with the ligatures and, for, of, the, and with. Omitting dot 3 from these forms the 4th decade, the ligatures ch, gh, sh, th, wh, ed, er, ou, ow and the letter w.

⠡ (braille pattern dots-16)	⠩ (braille pattern dots-146)	⠹ (braille pattern dots-1456)
ch	sh	th

(See English Braille.)

=== Formatting ===
Various formatting marks affect the values of the letters that follow them. They have no direct equivalent in print. The most important in English Braille are:

⠠ (braille pattern dots-6)	⠼ (braille pattern dots-3456)
Capital follows	Number follows

That is, ⠠⠁ is read as capital 'A', and ⠼⠁ as the digit '1'.

=== Punctuation ===
Basic punctuation marks in English Braille include:

⠂ (braille pattern dots-2)	⠆ (braille pattern dots-23)	⠄ (braille pattern dots-3)	⠒ (braille pattern dots-25)	⠤ (braille pattern dots-36)	⠨ (braille pattern dots-46)
Comma	Semicolon	Apostrophe	Colon	Hyphen	Decimal point
⠲ (braille pattern dots-256)	⠖ (braille pattern dots-235)	⠦ (braille pattern dots-236)	⠴ (braille pattern dots-356)	⠶ (braille pattern dots-2356)	⠌ (braille pattern dots-34)
Full stop (period)	Exclamation point	Open quote, question mark	Close quote	Bracket (parentheses)	Slash (fraction)

⠦ is both the question mark and the opening quotation mark. Its reading depends on whether it occurs before a word or after.

⠶ is used for both opening and closing parentheses. Its placement relative to spaces and other characters determines its interpretation.

Punctuation varies from language to language. For example, French Braille uses ⠢ for its question mark and swaps the quotation marks and parentheses (to ⠶ and ⠦⠴); it uses (⠲) for both the period and the decimal point, and the English decimal point (⠨) to mark capitalization.

=== Contractions ===
Braille contractions are words and affixes that are shortened so that they take up fewer cells. In English Braille, for example, the word afternoon is written with just three letters, ⠁⠋⠝ ⟨afn⟩, much like stenoscript. There are also several abbreviation marks that create what are effectively logograms. The most common of these is dot 5, which combines with the first letter of words. With the letter ⠍ m, the resulting word is ⠐⠍ mother. There are also ligatures ("contracted" letters), which are single letters in braille but correspond to more than one letter in print. The letter ⠯ and, for example, is used to write words with the sequence a-n-d in them, such as ⠛⠗⠯ grand.

⠁ (braille pattern dots-1) ⠋ (braille pattern dots-124) ⠝ (braille pattern dots-1345)	⠐ (braille pattern dots-5) ⠍ (braille pattern dots-134)	⠛ (braille pattern dots-1245) ⠗ (braille pattern dots-1235) ⠯ (braille pattern dots-12346)
afternoon (a-f-n)	mother (dot 5–m)	grand (g-r-and)

=== Page dimensions ===
Most braille embossers support between 34 and 40 cells per line, and 25 lines per page.

A manually operated Perkins braille typewriter supports a maximum of 42 cells per line (its margins are adjustable), and typical paper allows 25 lines per page.

A large interlining Stainsby has 36 cells per line and 18 lines per page.

An A4-sized Marburg braille frame, which allows interpoint braille (dots on both sides of the page, offset so they do not interfere with each other), has 30 cells per line and 27 lines per page.

=== Braille writing machine ===
Braille typewriter

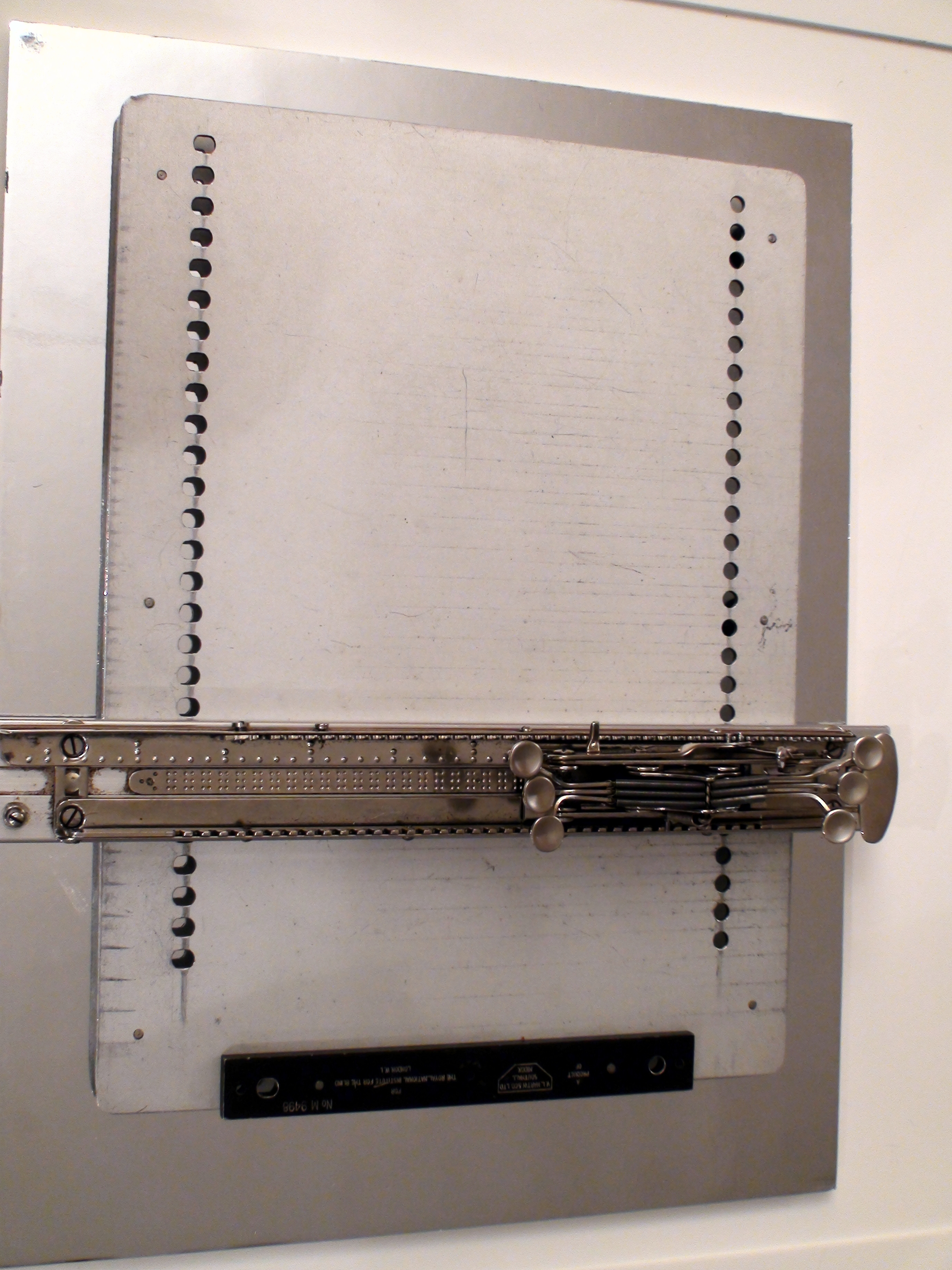
Stainsby Braille writer

A Braille writing machine is a typewriter with six keys that allows the user to write braille on a regular hard copy page.

The first Braille typewriter to gain general acceptance was invented by Frank Haven Hall (Superintendent of the Illinois School for the Blind), and was presented to the public in 1892.

The Stainsby Brailler, developed by Henry Stainsby in 1903, is a mechanical writer with a sliding carriage that moves over an aluminium plate as it embosses Braille characters. An improved version was introduced around 1933.

In 1951 David Abraham, a woodworking teacher at the Perkins School for the Blind, produced a more advanced Braille typewriter, the Perkins Brailler.

Braille printers or embossers were produced in the 1950s. In 1960 Robert Mann, a teacher in MIT, wrote DOTSYS, a software that allowed automatic braille translation, and another group created an embossing device called "M.I.T. Braillemboss". The Mitre Corporation team of Robert Gildea, Jonathan Millen, Reid Gerhart and Joseph Sullivan (now president of Duxbury Systems) developed DOTSYS III, the first braille translator written in a portable programming language. DOTSYS III was developed for the Atlanta Public Schools as a public domain program.

In 1991 Ernest Bate developed the Mountbatten Brailler, an electronic machine used to type braille on braille paper, giving it a number of additional features such as word processing, audio feedback and embossing. This version was improved in 2008 with a quiet writer that had an erase key.

In 2011 David S. Morgan produced the first SMART Brailler machine, with added text to speech function and allowed digital capture of data entered.

== Reading ==
Braille is traditionally read in hardcopy form, such as with paper books written in braille, documents produced in paper braille (such as restaurant menus), and braille labels or public signage. It can also be read on a refreshable braille display either as a stand-alone electronic device or connected to a computer or smartphone. Refreshable braille displays convert what is visually shown on a computer or smartphone screen into braille through a series of pins that rise and fall to form braille symbols. Currently more than 1% of all printed books have been translated into hardcopy braille.

The fastest braille readers apply a light touch and read braille with two hands, although reading braille with one hand is also possible. Although the finger can read only one braille character at a time, the brain chunks braille at a higher level, processing words a digraph, root or suffix at a time. Neuroimaging research has shown that, in people blinded early in life, tactile discrimination during braille reading can activate cortical areas normally associated with vision, including the primary and secondary visual cortex.

=== Reading techniques ===
There are many different styles and techniques used for the understanding and development of braille. A study by B. F. Holland suggests that there is no specific technique that is superior to any other. Since braille is one of the few writing systems where tactile perception, as opposed to visual perception, is used, a braille reader must develop new skills, such as the ability to create smooth and even pressures when running one's fingers along the words.

Another study by Lowenfield and Abel shows that braille can be read "the fastest and best... by students who read using the index fingers of both hands". Another reading skill is to finish reading the end of a line with the right hand and to find the beginning of the next line with the left hand simultaneously.

== Literacy ==
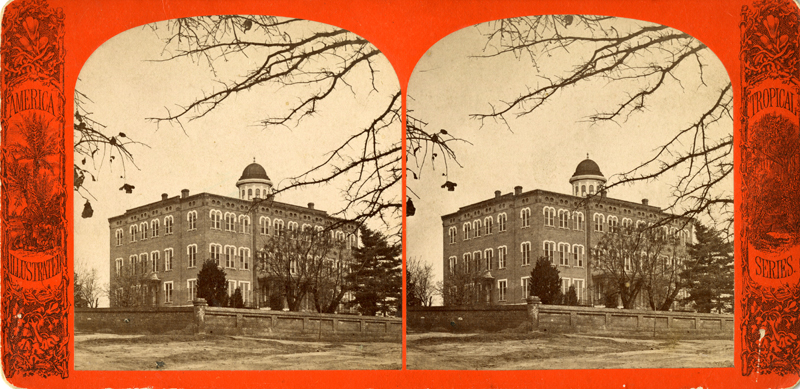
The Georgia Academy for the Blind, shown here in a stereograph from c. 1876. has been providing braille education and braille literacy since 1876.

Children who are blind miss out on fundamental parts of early and advanced education if not provided with the necessary tools, such as access to educational materials in braille. Children who are blind or visually impaired can begin learning foundational braille skills from a very young age to become fluent braille readers as they get older. Sighted children are naturally exposed to written language on signs, on TV and in the books they see. Blind children require the same early exposure to literacy, through access to braille rich environments and opportunities to explore the world around them. Print-braille books, for example, present text in both print and braille and can be read by sighted parents to blind children (and vice versa), allowing blind children to develop an early love for reading even before formal reading instruction begins.

Adults who experience sight loss later in life or who did not have the opportunity to learn it when they were younger can also learn braille. In most cases, adults who learn braille were already literate in print before vision loss and so instruction focuses more on developing the tactile and motor skills needed to read braille.

While different countries publish statistics on how many readers in a given organization request braille, these numbers only provide a partial picture of braille literacy statistics. For example, this data does not survey the entire population of braille readers or always include readers who are no longer in the school system (adults) or readers who request electronic braille materials. Therefore, there are currently no reliable statistics on braille literacy rates, as described in a publication in the Journal of Visual Impairment and Blindness. Regardless of the precise percentage of braille readers, there is consensus that braille should be provided to all those who benefit from it.

Numerous factors influence access to braille literacy, including school budget constraints, technology advancements such as screen-reader software, access to qualified instruction, and different philosophical views over how blind children should be educated.

In the US, a key turning point for braille literacy was the passage of the Rehabilitation Act of 1973, an act of Congress that moved thousands of children from specialized schools for the blind into mainstream public schools. Because only a small percentage of public schools could afford to train and hire braille-qualified teachers, braille literacy has declined since the law took effect. Braille literacy rates have improved slightly since the bill was passed, in part because of pressure from consumers and advocacy groups that has led 27 states to pass legislation mandating that children who are legally blind be given the opportunity to learn braille.

In 1998 there were 57,425 legally blind students registered in the United States, but only 10% (5,461) of them used braille as their primary reading medium.

Early braille education is crucial to literacy for a blind or low-vision child. A study conducted in the state of Washington found that people who learned braille at an early age did just as well as, if not better than, their sighted peers in several areas, including vocabulary and comprehension. In the preliminary adult study, while evaluating the correlation between adult literacy skills and employment, it was found that 44% of the participants who had learned to read in braille were unemployed, compared to the 77% unemployment rate of those who had learned to read using print. Currently, among the estimated 85,000 blind adults in the United States, 90% of those who are braille-literate are employed. Among adults who do not know braille, only 33% are employed. Statistically, history has proven that braille reading proficiency provides an essential skill set that allows blind or low-vision children to compete with their sighted peers in a school environment and later in life as they enter the workforce.

Regardless of the specific percentage of braille readers, proponents say how important increasing access to braille is for all of those who can benefit from it.

== Transcription ==
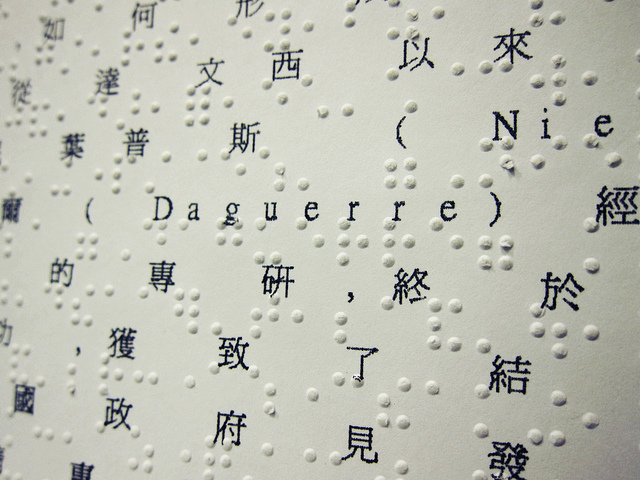
Taiwanese Braille and corresponding Mandarin text. Three Braille cells are needed to transcribe most Mandarin characters.

Although it is possible to transcribe print by simply substituting the equivalent braille character for its printed equivalent, in English such a character-by-character transcription (known as uncontracted braille) is typically used by beginners or those who only engage in short reading tasks (such as reading household labels).

Braille characters are much larger than their printed equivalents, and the standard 11 by 11 1/2 in (28 by 29 cm) page has room for only 25 lines of 43 characters. To reduce space and increase reading speed, most braille alphabets and orthographies use ligatures, abbreviations, and contractions. Virtually all English braille books in hardcopy (paper) format are transcribed in contracted braille: The Library of Congress's Instruction Manual for Braille Transcribing runs to over 300 pages, and braille transcribers must pass certification tests.

Uncontracted braille was previously known as grade 1 braille, and contracted braille was previously known as grade 2 braille. Uncontracted braille is a direct transliteration of print words (one-to-one correspondence); hence, the word "about" would contain all the same letters in uncontracted braille as it does in inkprint. Contracted braille includes short forms to save space; hence, for example, the letters "ab" when standing alone represent the word "about" in English contracted braille. In English, some braille users only learn uncontracted braille, particularly if braille is being used for shorter reading tasks such as reading household labels. However, those who plan to use braille for educational and employment purposes and longer reading texts often go on to contracted braille.

The system of contractions in English Braille begins with a set of 23 words contracted to single characters. Thus the word but is contracted to the single letter b, can to c, do to d, and so on. Even this simple rule creates issues requiring special cases; for example, d is, specifically, an abbreviation of the verb do; the noun do representing the note of the musical scale is a different word and must be spelled out.

Portions of words may be contracted, and many rules govern this process. For example, the character with dots 2-3-5 (the letter "f" lowered in the Braille cell) stands for "ff" when used in the middle of a word. At the beginning of a word, this same character stands for the word "to"; the character is written in braille with no space following it. (This contraction was removed in the Unified English Braille Code.) At the end of a word, the same character represents an exclamation point.

Some contractions are more similar than their print equivalents. For example, the contraction ⟨lr⟩, meaning "letter", differs from ⟨ll⟩, meaning "little", only by one dot in the second letter: ⠇⠇ little, ⠇⠗ letter. This causes greater confusion between the braille spellings of these words and can hinder the learning process of contracted braille.

The contraction rules take into account the linguistic structure of the word; thus, contractions are generally not to be used when their use would alter the usual braille form of a base word to which a prefix or suffix has been added. Some portions of the transcription rules are not fully codified and rely on the judgment of the transcriber. Thus, when the contraction rules permit the same word in more than one way, preference is given to "the contraction that more nearly approximates correct pronunciation".

"Grade 3 braille" is a variety of non-standardized systems that include many additional shorthand-like contractions. They are not used for publication, but by individuals for their personal convenience.

=== Translation software ===
When people produce braille, this is called braille transcription. When computer software produces braille, this is called a braille translator. Braille translation software exists to handle almost all of the common languages of the world, and many technical areas, such as mathematics (mathematical notation), for example WIMATS, music (musical notation), and tactile graphics.

== International uniformity ==
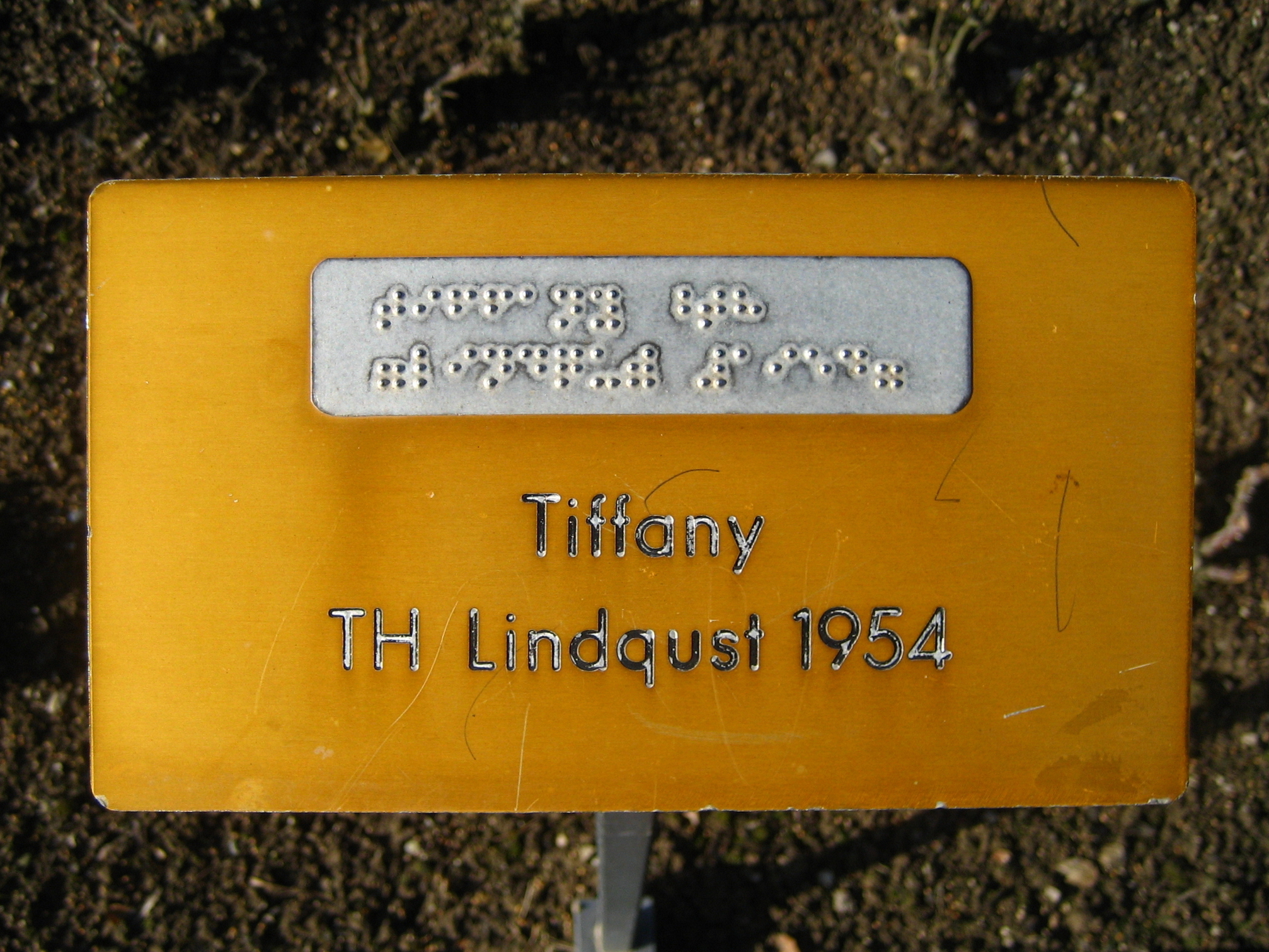
Braille plate at Duftrosengarten in Rapperswil, Switzerland

When braille was first adapted to languages other than French, many schemes were adopted, including mapping the native alphabet to the alphabetical order of French – e.g. in English W, which was not in the French alphabet at the time, is mapped to braille X, X to Y, Y to Z, and Z to the first French-accented letter – or completely rearranging the alphabet such that common letters are represented by the simplest braille patterns. Consequently, mutual intelligibility was greatly hindered by this state of affairs. In 1878, the International Congress on Work for the Blind, held in Paris, proposed an international braille standard, where braille codes for different languages and scripts would be based, not on the order of a particular alphabet, but on phonetic correspondence and transliteration to Latin.

This unified braille has been applied to the languages of India and Africa, Arabic, Vietnamese, Hebrew, Russian, and Armenian, as well as nearly all Latin-script languages. In Greek, for example, γ (g) is written as Latin g, despite the fact that it has the alphabetic position of c; Hebrew ב (b), the second letter of the alphabet and cognate with the Latin letter b, is sometimes pronounced /b/ and sometimes /v/, and is written b or v accordingly; Russian ц (ts) is written as c, which is the usual letter for /ts/ in those Slavic languages that use the Latin alphabet; and Arabic ف (f) is written as f, despite being historically p and occurring in that part of the Arabic alphabet (between historic o and q).

== Other conventions ==
Other systems for assigning values to braille patterns are also followed beside the simple mapping of the alphabetical order onto the original French order. Some braille alphabets start with unified braille, and then diverge significantly based on the phonology of the target languages, while others diverge even further.

In the various Chinese systems, traditional braille values are used for initial consonants and the simple vowels. In both Mandarin and Cantonese Braille, however, characters have different readings depending on whether they are placed in syllable-initial (onset) or syllable-final (rime) position. For instance, the cell for Latin k, ⠅, represents Cantonese k (g in Yale and other modern romanizations) when initial, but aak when final, while Latin j, ⠚, represents Cantonese initial j but final oei.

Novel systems of braille mapping include Korean, which adopts separate syllable-initial and syllable-final forms for its consonants, explicitly grouping braille cells into syllabic groups in the same way as hangul. Japanese, meanwhile, combines independent vowel dot patterns and modifier consonant dot patterns into a single braille cell – an abugida representation of each Japanese mora.

== Uses ==
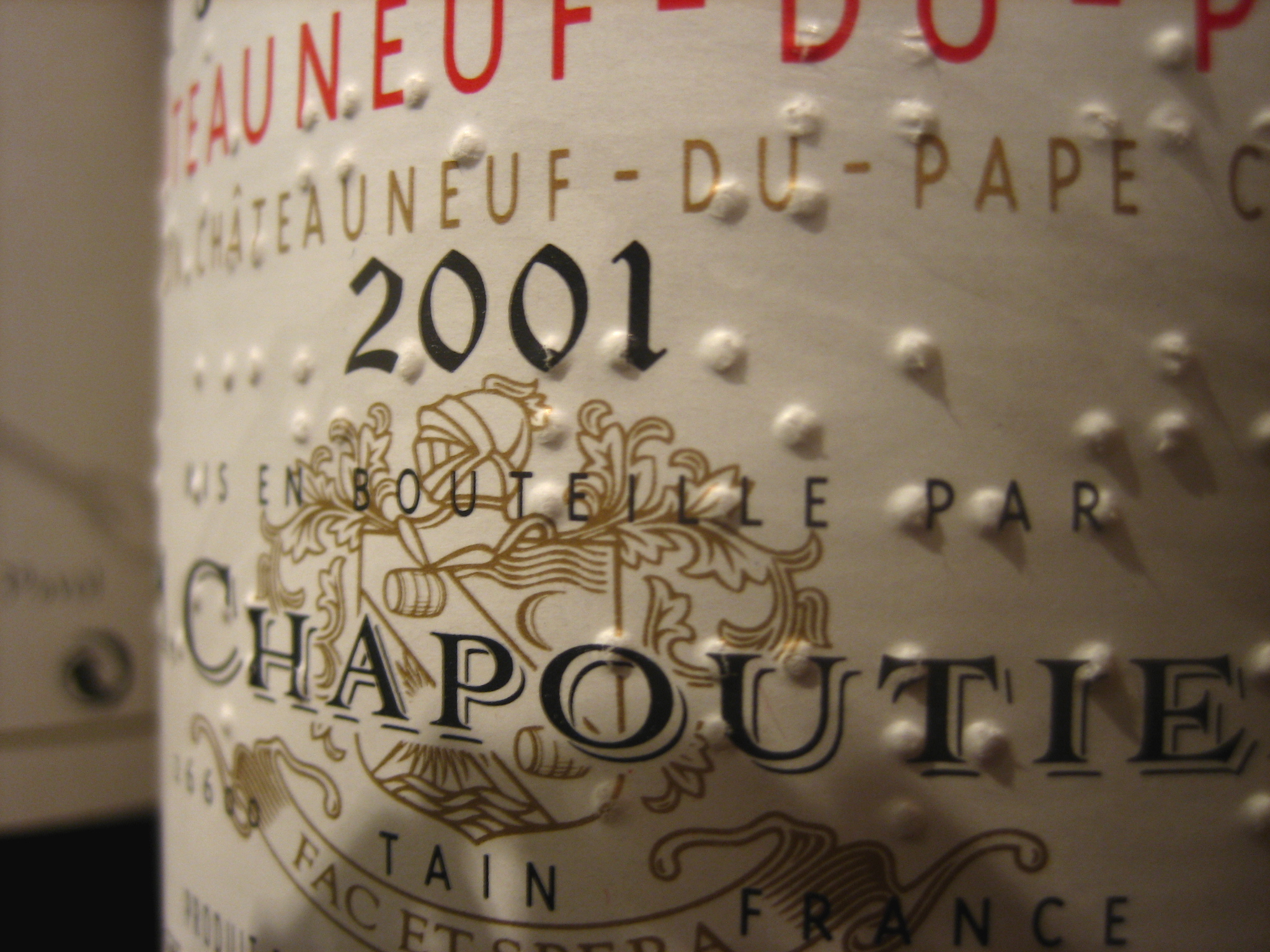
A bottle of Chapoutier wine, with braille on the label

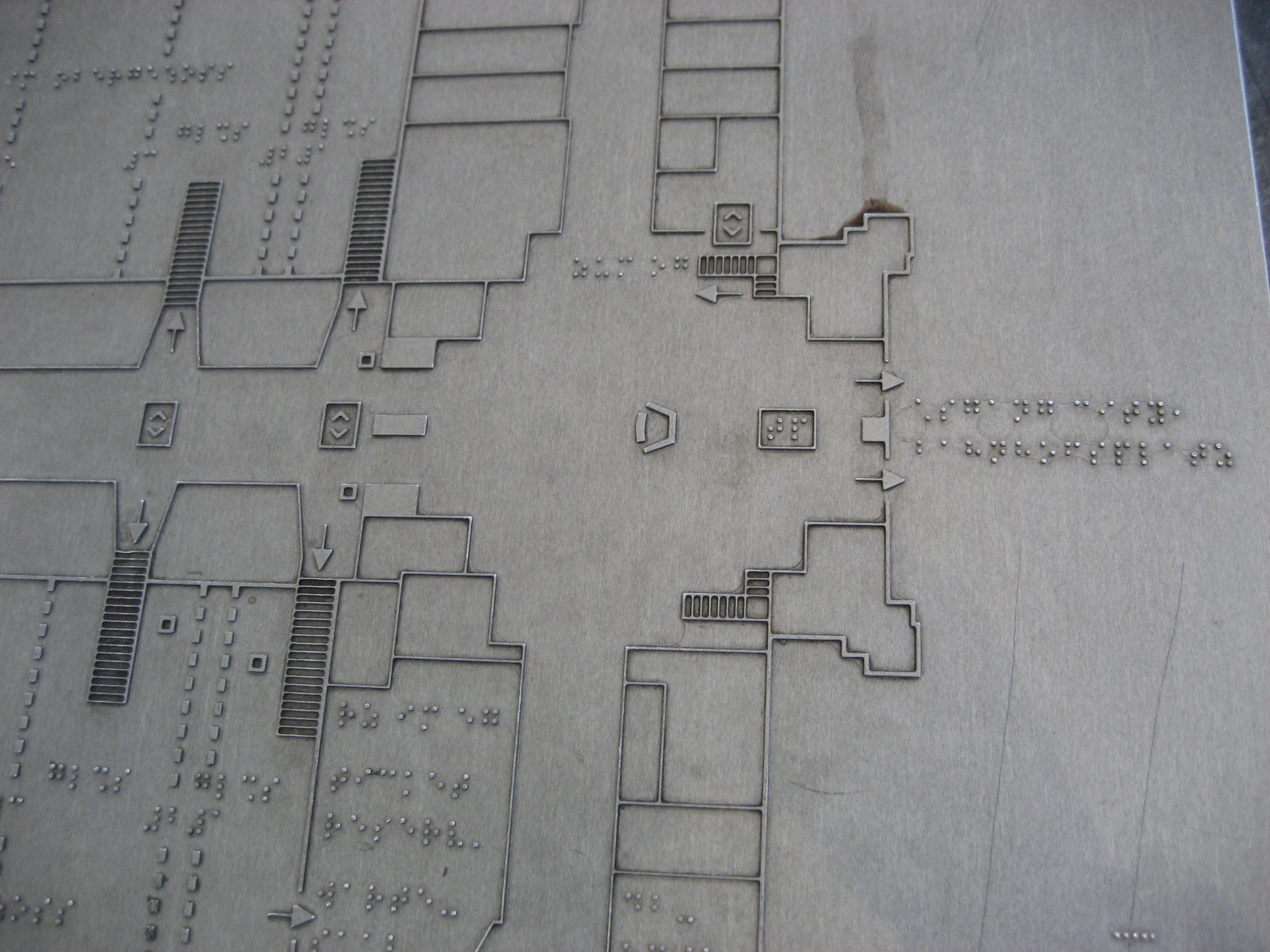
An embossed map of a German train station, with braille text

Braille is read by people who are blind, deafblind or who have low vision, and by both those born with a visual impairment and those who experience sight loss later in life. Braille may also be used by print impaired people, who although may be fully sighted, due to a physical disability are unable to read print. Even individuals with low vision will find that they benefit from braille, depending on level of vision or context (for example, when lighting or colour contrast is poor). Braille is used for both short and long reading tasks. Examples of short reading tasks include braille labels for identifying household items (or cards in a wallet), reading elevator buttons, accessing phone numbers, recipes, grocery lists and other personal notes. Examples of longer reading tasks include using braille to access educational materials, novels and magazines. People with access to a refreshable braille display can also use braille for reading email and ebooks, browsing the internet and accessing other electronic documents. It is also possible to adapt or purchase playing cards and board games in braille.

In India there are instances where the parliament acts have been published in braille, such as The Right to Information Act. Sylheti Braille is used in Northeast India.

In Canada, passenger safety information in braille and tactile seat row markers are required aboard planes, trains, large ferries, and interprovincial busses pursuant to the Canadian Transportation Agency's regulations.

In the United States, the Americans with Disabilities Act of 1990 requires various building signage to be in braille.

In the United Kingdom, medicines are required to have the name of the medicine in Braille on the labeling.

=== Currency ===
The current series of Canadian banknotes has a tactile feature consisting of raised dots that indicate the denomination, allowing bills to be easily identified by blind or low vision people. It does not use standard braille numbers to identify the value. Instead, the number of full braille cells, which can be simply counted by both braille readers and non-braille readers alike, is an indicator of the value of the bill.

Mexican bank notes, Australian bank notes, Indian rupee notes, Israeli new shekel notes and Russian ruble notes also have special raised symbols to make them identifiable by persons who are blind or have low vision.

Euro coins were designed in cooperation with organisations representing blind people, and as a result they incorporate many features allowing them to be distinguished by touch alone. In addition, their visual appearance is designed to make them easy to tell apart for persons who cannot read the inscriptions on the coins. "A good design for the blind and partially sighted is a good design for everybody" was the principle behind the cooperation of the European Central Bank and the European Blind Union during the design phase of the first series euro banknotes in the 1990s. As a result, the design of the first euro banknotes included several characteristics which aid both the blind and partially sighted to confidently use the notes.

Australia introduced the tactile feature onto its five-dollar banknote in 2016.

In the United Kingdom, the front of the £10 polymer note (the side with raised print), has two clusters of raised dots in the top left hand corner, and the £20 note has three. This tactile feature helps blind and partially sighted people identify the value of the note.

In 2003 the US Mint introduced the commemorative Alabama State Quarter, which recognized State Daughter Helen Keller on the Obverse, including the name Helen Keller in both English script and Braille inscription. This appears to be the first known use of braille on US Coin Currency, though not standard on all coins of this type.

== Unicode ==
The Braille set was added to the Unicode Standard in version 3.0 (1999).

Most braille embossers and refreshable braille displays do not use the Unicode code points, but instead reuse the 8-bit code points that are assigned to standard ASCII for braille ASCII. (Thus, for simple material, the same bitstream may be interpreted equally as visual letter forms for sighted readers or their exact semantic equivalent in tactile patterns for blind readers. However, some codes have quite different tactile versus visual interpretations and most are not even defined in Braille ASCII.)

Some embossers have proprietary control codes for 8-dot braille or for full graphics mode, where dots may be placed anywhere on the page without leaving any space between braille cells so that continuous lines can be drawn in diagrams, but these are rarely used and are not standard.

The Unicode standard encodes 6-dot and 8-dot braille glyphs according to their binary appearance, rather than following their assigned numeric order. Dot 1 corresponds to the least significant bit of the low byte of the Unicode scalar value, and dot 8 to the high bit of that byte.

The Unicode block for braille is U+2800 ... U+28FF. The mapping of patterns to characters etc. is language dependent: even for English for example, see American Braille and English Braille.

Braille Patterns^{[1]} Official Unicode Consortium code chart (PDF)
	0	1	2	3	4	5	6	7	8	9	A	B	C	D	E	F
U+280x	⠀	⠁	⠂	⠃	⠄	⠅	⠆	⠇	⠈	⠉	⠊	⠋	⠌	⠍	⠎	⠏
U+281x	⠐	⠑	⠒	⠓	⠔	⠕	⠖	⠗	⠘	⠙	⠚	⠛	⠜	⠝	⠞	⠟
U+282x	⠠	⠡	⠢	⠣	⠤	⠥	⠦	⠧	⠨	⠩	⠪	⠫	⠬	⠭	⠮	⠯
U+283x	⠰	⠱	⠲	⠳	⠴	⠵	⠶	⠷	⠸	⠹	⠺	⠻	⠼	⠽	⠾	⠿
(end of 6-dot cell patterns)
U+284x	⡀	⡁	⡂	⡃	⡄	⡅	⡆	⡇	⡈	⡉	⡊	⡋	⡌	⡍	⡎	⡏
U+285x	⡐	⡑	⡒	⡓	⡔	⡕	⡖	⡗	⡘	⡙	⡚	⡛	⡜	⡝	⡞	⡟
U+286x	⡠	⡡	⡢	⡣	⡤	⡥	⡦	⡧	⡨	⡩	⡪	⡫	⡬	⡭	⡮	⡯
U+287x	⡰	⡱	⡲	⡳	⡴	⡵	⡶	⡷	⡸	⡹	⡺	⡻	⡼	⡽	⡾	⡿
U+288x	⢀	⢁	⢂	⢃	⢄	⢅	⢆	⢇	⢈	⢉	⢊	⢋	⢌	⢍	⢎	⢏
U+289x	⢐	⢑	⢒	⢓	⢔	⢕	⢖	⢗	⢘	⢙	⢚	⢛	⢜	⢝	⢞	⢟
U+28Ax	⢠	⢡	⢢	⢣	⢤	⢥	⢦	⢧	⢨	⢩	⢪	⢫	⢬	⢭	⢮	⢯
U+28Bx	⢰	⢱	⢲	⢳	⢴	⢵	⢶	⢷	⢸	⢹	⢺	⢻	⢼	⢽	⢾	⢿
U+28Cx	⣀	⣁	⣂	⣃	⣄	⣅	⣆	⣇	⣈	⣉	⣊	⣋	⣌	⣍	⣎	⣏
U+28Dx	⣐	⣑	⣒	⣓	⣔	⣕	⣖	⣗	⣘	⣙	⣚	⣛	⣜	⣝	⣞	⣟
U+28Ex	⣠	⣡	⣢	⣣	⣤	⣥	⣦	⣧	⣨	⣩	⣪	⣫	⣬	⣭	⣮	⣯
U+28Fx	⣰	⣱	⣲	⣳	⣴	⣵	⣶	⣷	⣸	⣹	⣺	⣻	⣼	⣽	⣾	⣿
Notes 1.As of Unicode version 18.0

== Observation ==
Every year on 4 January, World Braille Day is observed internationally to commemorate the birth of Louis Braille and to recognize his efforts. Although the event is not considered a public holiday, it has been recognized by the United Nations as an official day of celebration since 2019.

The 200th anniversary of the launch of braille was celebrated in 2024. In the UK, the Royal National Institute of Blind People has held celebrations from September 2024 until August 2025.

== Devices ==
There is a variety of contemporary electronic devices that serve the needs of blind people that operate in Braille, such as refreshable braille displays and braille e-books that use different technologies for transmitting graphic information of different types (pictures, maps, graphs, texts, etc.).

== See also ==
- Accessible publishing – Approach to publishing and book design
- Braille literacy – Ability to read using braille
- Braille music – Braille form of musical notation
- Braille technology – Type of assistive technology
- Braille translator – Software program used to translate text into braille script
- Braille watch – Watch for people with visual impairment
- English Braille – Tactile writing system for English
- Moon type – Writing system for the blind
- National Braille Press – Braille publisher in Boston, MA
- Nemeth Braille – Braille code for mathematics and science
- Nyctography – Simple substitution cipher
- Needle punch – (Making) a small hole in a thin material
- Refreshable Braille display – Device for displaying braille characters
- Swagat Thorat – Indian wildlife photographer, playwright, painter, editor, and director ("the Braille man of India")
- Tactile alphabet – Alphabet readable by touch
- Tactile graphic – Image that can be read by touch
- Tangible symbol systems – Pictures or objects used as symbols
- Unified English Braille – Braille standard for the English language
- Accessible Books Consortium – Open-access advocacy organization
- List of binary codes
- List of international common standards
