= Braille pattern dots-123 =

Braille pattern

6-dot braille cells
⠀	⠁	⠃	⠉	⠙	⠑	⠋	⠛	⠓	⠊	⠚	⠈	⠘
⠄	⠅	⠇	⠍	⠝	⠕	⠏	⠟	⠗	⠎	⠞	⠌	⠜
⠤	⠥	⠧	⠭	⠽	⠵	⠯	⠿	⠷	⠮	⠾	⠬	⠼
⠠	⠡	⠣	⠩	⠹	⠱	⠫	⠻	⠳	⠪	⠺	⠨	⠸
shift down	⠂	⠆	⠒	⠲	⠢	⠖	⠶	⠦	⠔	⠴	⠐	⠰

The Braille pattern dots-123 ( ⠇ ) is a 6-dot braille cell with all three left side dots raised, or an 8-dot braille cell with the top, upper-middle, and lower-middle left dots raised. It is represented by the Unicode code point U+2807, and in Braille ASCII with "L".

Character information
Preview	⠇ (braille pattern dots-123)	
Unicode name	BRAILLE PATTERN DOTS-123	
Encodings	decimal	hex
Unicode	10247	U+2807
UTF-8	226 160 135	E2 A0 87
Numeric character reference	&#10247;	&#x2807;
Braille ASCII	76	4C

== Unified Braille ==
In unified international braille, the braille pattern dots-123 is used to represent a lateral approximant, such as /l/, /ʟ/, or /ʎ/, and is otherwise assigned as needed.

=== Table of unified braille values ===
French Braille	L, "le"
English Braille	L
English Contraction	like
German Braille	L
Bharati Braille	ल / ਲ / લ / ল / ଳ / ల / ಲ / ല / ல / ල / ل
Icelandic Braille	L
IPA Braille	/l/
Russian Braille	Л
Slovak Braille	L
Arabic Braille	ل
Persian Braille	ل
Irish Braille	L
Thai Braille	ล l
Luxembourgish Braille	l (minuscule)

== Other braille ==
Japanese Braille	ni / に / ニ
Korean Braille	sa / 사
Mainland Chinese Braille	l
Taiwanese Braille	!
Two-Cell Chinese Braille	l- -ī/-ū/-ǖ
Nemeth Braille	not an independent sign
Algerian Braille	س

== Plus dots 7 and 8 ==
Related to Braille pattern dots-123 are Braille patterns 1237, 1238, and 12378, which are used in 8-dot braille systems, such as Gardner-Salinas and Luxembourgish Braille.

Character information
Preview	⡇ (braille pattern dots-1237)		⢇ (braille pattern dots-1238)		⣇ (braille pattern dots-12378)	
Unicode name	BRAILLE PATTERN DOTS-1237		BRAILLE PATTERN DOTS-1238		BRAILLE PATTERN DOTS-12378	
Encodings	decimal	hex	dec	hex	dec	hex
Unicode	10311	U+2847	10375	U+2887	10439	U+28C7
UTF-8	226 161 135	E2 A1 87	226 162 135	E2 A2 87	226 163 135	E2 A3 87
Numeric character reference	&#10311;	&#x2847;	&#10375;	&#x2887;	&#10439;	&#x28C7;

	dots 1237	dots 1238	dots 12378
Gardner Salinas Braille	L (capital)	λ (lambda)	Λ (Lambda)
Luxembourgish Braille	L (capital)		

== Related 8-dot kantenji patterns ==
In the Japanese kantenji braille, the standard 8-dot Braille patterns 237, 1237, 2347, and 12347 are the patterns related to Braille pattern dots-123, since the two additional dots of kantenji patterns 0123, 1237, and 01237 are placed above the base 6-dot cell, instead of below, as in standard 8-dot braille.

Character information
Preview	⡆ (braille pattern dots-237)		⡇ (braille pattern dots-1237)		⡎ (braille pattern dots-2347)		⡏ (braille pattern dots-12347)	
Unicode name	BRAILLE PATTERN DOTS-237		BRAILLE PATTERN DOTS-1237		BRAILLE PATTERN DOTS-2347		BRAILLE PATTERN DOTS-12347	
Encodings	decimal	hex	dec	hex	dec	hex	dec	hex
Unicode	10310	U+2846	10311	U+2847	10318	U+284E	10319	U+284F
UTF-8	226 161 134	E2 A1 86	226 161 135	E2 A1 87	226 161 142	E2 A1 8E	226 161 143	E2 A1 8F
Numeric character reference	&#10310;	&#x2846;	&#10311;	&#x2847;	&#10318;	&#x284E;	&#10319;	&#x284F;

=== Kantenji using braille patterns 237, 1237, 2347, or 12347 ===
This listing includes kantenji using Braille pattern dots-123 for all 6349 kanji found in JIS C 6226-1978.

- - 水

==== Variants and thematic compounds ====
- - selector 1 + に/氵 = 朮
- - selector 3 + に/氵 = 奚
- - selector 4 + に/氵 = 旨
- - selector 5 + に/氵 = 賈
- - selector 6 + に/氵 = 丞
- - に/氵 + selector 3 = 泡
- - に/氵 + selector 4 = 泳
- - 数 + に/氵 = 壬
- - 比 + に/氵 = 西
- - 宿 + に/氵 = 垂
- - お/頁 + に/氵 = 鬼

==== Compounds of 水 ====
- - と/戸 + に/氵 = 尿
- - け/犬 + に/氵 = 泰
  - - ら/月 + け/犬 + に/氵 = 滕
- - 氷/氵 + 宿 + に/氵 = 冰
- - に/氵 + 日 + selector 6 = 沓
  - - み/耳 + に/氵 = 踏
- - に/氵 + こ/子 + selector 1 = 汞
- - に/氵 + へ/⺩ + selector 2 = 漿
- - に/氵 + 日 + を/貝 = 潁
- - に/氵 + 宿 + ⺼ = 盥
- - の/禾 + 宿 + に/氵 = 粱
- - も/門 + 宿 + に/氵 = 閖
- - と/戸 + み/耳 + に/氵 = 鞜
- - に/氵 + つ/土 = 塗
- - に/氵 + ち/竹 = 池
- - に/氵 + て/扌 = 決
  - - に/氵 + に/氵 + て/扌 = 决
- - に/氵 + も/門 = 汽
- - に/氵 + 宿 = 沖
  - - に/氵 + に/氵 + 宿 = 冲
- - に/氵 + の/禾 = 没
  - - に/氵 + に/氵 + の/禾 = 沒
- - に/氵 + か/金 = 河
- - に/氵 + ぬ/力 = 沼
- - に/氵 + え/訁 = 沿
- - に/氵 + こ/子 = 法
  - - へ/⺩ + に/氵 + こ/子 = 琺
- - に/氵 + ひ/辶 = 波
  - - ま/石 + に/氵 + ひ/辶 = 碆
  - - 心 + に/氵 + ひ/辶 = 菠
- - に/氵 + ま/石 = 泣
  - - に/氵 + ま/石 + り/分 = 潼
- - に/氵 + 仁/亻 = 泥
- - に/氵 + へ/⺩ = 注
  - - に/氵 + へ/⺩ + selector 1 = 汪
  - - に/氵 + へ/⺩ + し/巿 = 涛
- - に/氵 + 龸 = 洗
- - に/氵 + れ/口 = 洛
- - に/氵 + し/巿 = 洩
- - に/氵 + せ/食 = 活
  - - も/門 + に/氵 + せ/食 = 濶
- - に/氵 + く/艹 = 流
- - に/氵 + 囗 = 浅
- - に/氵 + り/分 = 浜
- - に/氵 + ほ/方 = 浦
  - - 心 + に/氵 + ほ/方 = 蒲
  - - に/氵 + ほ/方 + selector 1 = 汐
    - - に/氵 + ほ/方 + ぬ/力 = 洌
    - - に/氵 + ほ/方 + 龸 = 淤
- - に/氵 + や/疒 = 浪
- - に/氵 + は/辶 = 海
  - - つ/土 + に/氵 + は/辶 = 塰
- - に/氵 + そ/馬 = 消
- - に/氵 + け/犬 = 涙
- - に/氵 + な/亻 = 液
- - に/氵 + う/宀/#3 = 淑
- - に/氵 + 火 = 淡
- - に/氵 + す/発 = 深
- - に/氵 + 比 = 混
- - に/氵 + ん/止 = 渋
  - - に/氵 + に/氵 + ん/止 = 澁
  - - に/氵 + ん/止 + お/頁 = 瀕
- - に/氵 + ゑ/訁 = 渡
- - に/氵 + ⺼ = 温
  - - 心 + に/氵 + ⺼ = 薀
- - に/氵 + さ/阝 = 港
- - に/氵 + ら/月 = 湖
- - に/氵 + 数 = 湯
  - - ⺼ + に/氵 + 数 = 盪
  - - く/艹 + に/氵 + 数 = 蕩
- - に/氵 + ゆ/彳 = 湾
- - に/氵 + い/糹/#2 = 湿
- - に/氵 + め/目 = 満
  - - る/忄 + に/氵 + め/目 = 懣
  - - に/氵 + め/目 + selector 4 = 湎
- - に/氵 + む/車 = 溝
- - に/氵 + た/⽥ = 溶
- - に/氵 + ゐ/幺 = 滋
- - に/氵 + 心 = 滝
- - に/氵 + よ/广 = 滞
  - - に/氵 + に/氵 + よ/广 = 滯
- - に/氵 + お/頁 = 滴
- - に/氵 + き/木 = 漆
- - に/氵 + を/貝 = 漸
- - に/氵 + 日 = 潮
- - に/氵 + と/戸 = 澄
- - に/氵 + 氷/氵 = 激
- - に/氵 + ろ/十 = 濃
- - た/⽥ + に/氵 = 沢
- - そ/馬 + に/氵 = 洋
- - こ/子 + に/氵 = 浩
- - 氷/氵 + に/氵 = 淫
  - - ち/竹 + 氷/氵 + に/氵 = 霪
- - ん/止 + に/氵 = 渉
- - ゐ/幺 + に/氵 = 渓
  - - ゐ/幺 + ゐ/幺 + に/氵 = 溪
- - ひ/辶 + に/氵 = 減
- - す/発 + に/氵 = 渠
- - や/疒 + に/氵 = 濯
- - に/氵 + に/氵 + 囗 = 淺
- - に/氵 + に/氵 + め/目 = 滿
- - に/氵 + に/氵 + い/糹/#2 = 濕
- - に/氵 + に/氵 + り/分 = 濱
- - に/氵 + に/氵 + 心 = 瀧
- - に/氵 + に/氵 + ゆ/彳 = 灣
- - き/木 + 宿 + に/氵 = 梁
- - に/氵 + 宿 + さ/阝 = 氾
- - に/氵 + 数 + て/扌 = 汀
- - に/氵 + 宿 + ろ/十 = 汁
- - に/氵 + selector 4 + 龸 = 汎
- - に/氵 + や/疒 + selector 1 = 汕
- - に/氵 + selector 4 + ゐ/幺 = 汲
- - に/氵 + は/辶 + ん/止 = 汳
- - に/氵 + 宿 + り/分 = 汾
- - に/氵 + 宿 + 心 = 沁
- - に/氵 + 比 + を/貝 = 沂
- - に/氵 + 宿 + け/犬 = 沃
- - に/氵 + 比 + ふ/女 = 沌
- - に/氵 + 比 + ⺼ = 沍
- - に/氵 + 宿 + き/木 = 沐
- - に/氵 + 龸 + ん/止 = 沚
- - に/氵 + 宿 + し/巿 = 沛
- - に/氵 + き/木 + selector 5 = 沫
- - に/氵 + selector 5 + そ/馬 = 沮
- - に/氵 + 宿 + ひ/辶 = 沱
- - に/氵 + 宿 + た/⽥ = 沺
- - に/氵 + れ/口 + ろ/十 = 沽
- - に/氵 + れ/口 + と/戸 = 沾
- - に/氵 + ろ/十 + よ/广 = 泄
- - に/氵 + 囗 + な/亻 = 泅
- - に/氵 + ゆ/彳 + selector 1 = 泓
- - に/氵 + 数 + る/忄 = 泗
- - に/氵 + り/分 + か/金 = 泙
- - に/氵 + selector 2 + の/禾 = 泛
- - に/氵 + selector 1 + を/貝 = 泝
- - に/氵 + 宿 + め/目 = 泪
- - に/氵 + み/耳 + ん/止 = 泯
- - に/氵 + け/犬 + お/頁 = 泱
- - に/氵 + selector 5 + か/金 = 洙
- - に/氵 + 囗 + と/戸 = 洞
- - に/氵 + ゆ/彳 + な/亻 = 洟
- - に/氵 + selector 4 + こ/子 = 洪
- - に/氵 + selector 1 + ⺼ = 洫
- - に/氵 + か/金 + selector 4 = 洲
- - に/氵 + ふ/女 + れ/口 = 洳
- - に/氵 + 日 + す/発 = 洵
- - に/氵 + も/門 + selector 6 = 洶
- - に/氵 + 龸 + selector 2 = 洸
- - に/氵 + り/分 + 囗 = 洽
- - に/氵 + て/扌 + を/貝 = 浙
- - に/氵 + 龸 + む/車 = 浚
- - に/氵 + う/宀/#3 + 宿 = 浣
- - に/氵 + 比 + り/分 = 浬
- - に/氵 + 宿 + な/亻 = 浹
- - に/氵 + 宿 + つ/土 = 涅
- - に/氵 + 龸 + つ/土 = 涌
- - に/氵 + は/辶 + selector 1 = 涎
- - に/氵 + 龸 + ら/月 = 涓
- - に/氵 + ゆ/彳 + 宿 = 涕
- - に/氵 + つ/土 + を/貝 = 涜
- - に/氵 + 囗 + ろ/十 = 涸
- - に/氵 + う/宀/#3 + よ/广 = 淀
- - に/氵 + き/木 + お/頁 = 淅
- - に/氵 + め/目 + ⺼ = 淆
- - に/氵 + selector 4 + き/木 = 淇
- - に/氵 + き/木 + き/木 = 淋
- - に/氵 + selector 6 + は/辶 = 淌
- - に/氵 + ふ/女 + さ/阝 = 淒
- - に/氵 + う/宀/#3 + む/車 = 淕
- - に/氵 + 宿 + と/戸 = 淘
- - に/氵 + う/宀/#3 + ね/示 = 淙
- - に/氵 + 心 + こ/子 = 淞
- - に/氵 + 宿 + る/忄 = 淪
- - に/氵 + お/頁 + ろ/十 = 淬
- - に/氵 + 宿 + い/糹/#2 = 淮
- - に/氵 + 宿 + ぬ/力 = 淵
- - に/氵 + selector 6 + 心 = 淹
- - に/氵 + に/氵 + 囗 = 淺
- - に/氵 + う/宀/#3 + ぬ/力 = 渊
- - に/氵 + 龸 + ぬ/力 = 渕
- - に/氵 + 龸 + ⺼ = 渙
- - に/氵 + と/戸 + 日 = 渚
- - に/氵 + 龸 + ゆ/彳 = 渝
- - に/氵 + selector 6 + て/扌 = 渟
- - に/氵 + き/木 + 日 = 渣
- - に/氵 + ぬ/力 + ろ/十 = 渤
- - に/氵 + と/戸 + ゆ/彳 = 渥
- - に/氵 + 宿 + か/金 = 渦
- - に/氵 + 宿 + よ/广 = 渫
- - に/氵 + た/⽥ + ⺼ = 渭
- - に/氵 + 比 + か/金 = 渮
- - に/氵 + は/辶 + selector 3 = 游
- - に/氵 + ほ/方 + そ/馬 = 渺
- - に/氵 + 宿 + む/車 = 渾
- - に/氵 + は/辶 + い/糹/#2 = 湃
- - に/氵 + け/犬 + け/犬 = 湊
- - に/氵 + 宿 + の/禾 = 湍
- - に/氵 + き/木 + め/目 = 湘
- - に/氵 + selector 1 + き/木 = 湛
- - に/氵 + 日 + へ/⺩ = 湟
- - に/氵 + ぬ/力 + た/⽥ = 湧
- - に/氵 + の/禾 + 火 = 湫
- - に/氵 + 宿 + 仁/亻 = 湲
- - に/氵 + 日 + 氷/氵 = 湶
- - に/氵 + き/木 + ぬ/力 = 溂
- - に/氵 + 宿 + す/発 = 溌
- - に/氵 + よ/广 + も/門 = 溏
- - に/氵 + つ/土 + こ/子 = 溘
- - に/氵 + ら/月 + た/⽥ = 溜
- - に/氵 + 龸 + 日 = 溟
- - に/氵 + selector 4 + て/扌 = 溥
- - に/氵 + ら/月 + は/辶 = 溯
- - に/氵 + 宿 + え/訁 = 溲
- - に/氵 + 宿 + 囗 = 溷
- - に/氵 + ゆ/彳 + ゆ/彳 = 溺
- - に/氵 + し/巿 + ろ/十 = 溽
- - に/氵 + 宿 + ほ/方 = 滂
- - に/氵 + り/分 + お/頁 = 滄
- - に/氵 + す/発 + き/木 = 滌
- - に/氵 + う/宀/#3 + ま/石 = 滓
- - に/氵 + 囗 + ひ/辶 = 滬
- - に/氵 + selector 1 + う/宀/#3 = 滲
- - に/氵 + ん/止 + selector 2 = 滷
- - に/氵 + え/訁 + そ/馬 = 滸
- - に/氵 + 宿 + 龸 = 滾
- - に/氵 + に/氵 + め/目 = 滿
- - に/氵 + そ/馬 + 比 = 漉
- - に/氵 + selector 4 + い/糹/#2 = 漓
- - に/氵 + 宿 + そ/馬 = 漕
- - に/氵 + 宿 + く/艹 = 漠
- - に/氵 + ひ/辶 + む/車 = 漣
- - に/氵 + 宿 + ん/止 = 漱
- - に/氵 + ゆ/彳 + と/戸 = 漲
- - に/氵 + の/禾 + た/⽥ = 潘
- - に/氵 + 龸 + ろ/十 = 潦
- - に/氵 + れ/口 + し/巿 = 潯
- - に/氵 + 宿 + を/貝 = 潰
- - に/氵 + け/犬 + り/分 = 潴
- - に/氵 + ら/月 + 氷/氵 = 潸
- - に/氵 + 宿 + こ/子 = 潺
- - に/氵 + う/宀/#3 + ん/止 = 澀
- - に/氵 + 宿 + や/疒 = 澂
- - に/氵 + selector 6 + つ/土 = 澆
- - に/氵 + 宿 + う/宀/#3 = 澎
- - に/氵 + 宿 + ら/月 = 澗
- - に/氵 + れ/口 + う/宀/#3 = 澡
- - に/氵 + ろ/十 + か/金 = 澣
- - た/⽥ + た/⽥ + に/氵 = 澤
- - に/氵 + ち/竹 + ん/止 = 澪
- - に/氵 + こ/子 + の/禾 = 澱
- - に/氵 + 囗 + の/禾 = 澳
- - に/氵 + 宿 + 日 = 澹
- - に/氵 + よ/广 + け/犬 = 濂
- - に/氵 + 宿 + ふ/女 = 濆
- - に/氵 + 囗 + め/目 = 濔
- - に/氵 + に/氵 + い/糹/#2 = 濕
- - に/氵 + 宿 + て/扌 = 濘
- - に/氵 + 龸 + そ/馬 = 濠
- - に/氵 + 龸 + め/目 = 濬
- - に/氵 + な/亻 + な/亻 = 濮
- - に/氵 + に/氵 + り/分 = 濱
- - に/氵 + お/頁 + 囗 = 濺
- - に/氵 + す/発 + 心 = 濾
- - に/氵 + そ/馬 + や/疒 = 瀁
- - に/氵 + 宿 + selector 1 = 瀉
- - に/氵 + う/宀/#3 + の/禾 = 瀋
- - に/氵 + 龸 + か/金 = 瀏
- - に/氵 + 日 + こ/子 = 瀑
- - に/氵 + 龸 + た/⽥ = 瀘
- - に/氵 + ろ/十 + む/車 = 瀚
- - に/氵 + selector 5 + ほ/方 = 瀛
- - に/氵 + こ/子 + ん/止 = 瀝
- - に/氵 + せ/食 + 宿 = 瀞
- - に/氵 + ぬ/力 + ゆ/彳 = 瀟
- - に/氵 + に/氵 + 心 = 瀧
- - に/氵 + り/分 + 氷/氵 = 瀲
- - に/氵 + も/門 + ひ/辶 = 瀾
- - に/氵 + 囗 + 比 = 灑
- - に/氵 + く/艹 + い/糹/#2 = 灘
- - に/氵 + に/氵 + ゆ/彳 = 灣
- - 心 + 宿 + に/氵 = 藻
- - く/艹 + 宿 + に/氵 = 蘯
- - ち/竹 + 宿 + に/氵 = 霑
- - に/氵 + 宿 + せ/食 = 鴻

==== Compounds of 朮 ====
- - は/辶 + に/氵 = 述
- - ろ/十 + に/氵 = 求
  - - へ/⺩ + に/氵 = 球
  - - ね/示 + ろ/十 + に/氵 = 裘
  - - ひ/辶 + ろ/十 + に/氵 = 逑
  - - selector 4 + へ/⺩ + に/氵 = 毬

==== Compounds of 旨 ====
- - て/扌 + に/氵 = 指
- - ⺼ + に/氵 = 脂
- - ゑ/訁 + に/氵 = 詣
- - と/戸 + selector 4 + に/氵 = 耆
- - 龸 + 宿 + に/氵 = 嘗
- - せ/食 + 宿 + に/氵 = 鮨

==== Compounds of 賈 ====
- - な/亻 + な/亻 + に/氵 = 價

==== Compounds of 丞 ====
- - く/艹 + に/氵 = 蒸
- - て/扌 + selector 6 + に/氵 = 拯
- - に/氵 + 囗 + ま/石 = 涵

==== Compounds of 泡 ====
- - く/艹 + に/氵 + selector 3 = 萢

==== Compounds of 壬 ====
- - 仁/亻 + に/氵 = 任
  - - を/貝 + に/氵 = 賃
  - - ふ/女 + 仁/亻 + に/氵 = 姙
  - - る/忄 + 仁/亻 + に/氵 = 恁
  - - 心 + 仁/亻 + に/氵 = 荏
  - - ね/示 + 仁/亻 + に/氵 = 袵
- - ふ/女 + に/氵 = 妊
- - ね/示 + 数 + に/氵 = 衽
- - ふ/女 + 数 + に/氵 = 婬

==== Compounds of 西 ====
- - selector 1 + 比 + に/氵 = 襾
- - な/亻 + に/氵 = 価
- - 日 + に/氵 = 晒
- - 心 + に/氵 = 栗
  - - 心 + に/氵 + ね/示 = 瓢
  - - ち/竹 + 心 + に/氵 = 篥
  - - る/忄 + に/氵 = 慄
- - せ/食 + に/氵 = 酒
- - に/氵 + ね/示 = 票
  - - き/木 + に/氵 = 標
  - - に/氵 + に/氵 = 漂
  - - ぬ/力 + に/氵 + ね/示 = 剽
  - - ふ/女 + に/氵 + ね/示 = 嫖
  - - る/忄 + に/氵 + ね/示 = 慓
  - - い/糹/#2 + に/氵 + ね/示 = 縹
  - - む/車 + に/氵 + ね/示 = 飄
  - - そ/馬 + に/氵 + ね/示 = 驃
  - - せ/食 + に/氵 + ね/示 = 鰾
  - - む/車 + 宿 + に/氵 = 飃
- - に/氵 + ふ/女 = 要
- - 火 + に/氵 = 煙
- - れ/口 + 比 + に/氵 = 哂
- - つ/土 + 比 + に/氵 = 堙
- - は/辶 + 比 + に/氵 = 廼
- - き/木 + 比 + に/氵 = 栖
- - に/氵 + 比 + に/氵 = 湮
- - か/金 + 比 + に/氵 = 甄
- - ひ/辶 + 比 + に/氵 = 迺
- - に/氵 + 宿 + に/氵 = 洒
- - に/氵 + 日 + ろ/十 = 潭
- - に/氵 + 宿 + 氷/氵 = 覈
- - に/氵 + う/宀/#3 + そ/馬 = 覊

==== Compounds of 垂 ====
- - め/目 + に/氵 = 睡
- - さ/阝 + に/氵 = 郵
- - か/金 + に/氵 = 錘
- - れ/口 + 宿 + に/氵 = 唾
- - て/扌 + 宿 + に/氵 = 捶
- - さ/阝 + 宿 + に/氵 = 陲

==== Compounds of 鬼 ====
- - つ/土 + に/氵 = 塊
- - え/訁 + に/氵 = 魂
- - よ/广 + に/氵 = 魔
- - な/亻 + お/頁 + に/氵 = 傀
- - や/疒 + お/頁 + に/氵 = 嵬
- - る/忄 + お/頁 + に/氵 = 愧
- - 心 + お/頁 + に/氵 = 槐
- - へ/⺩ + お/頁 + に/氵 = 瑰
- - く/艹 + お/頁 + に/氵 = 蒐
- - さ/阝 + お/頁 + に/氵 = 隗
- - せ/食 + お/頁 + に/氵 = 餽
- - 日 + お/頁 + に/氵 = 魄
- - の/禾 + お/頁 + に/氵 = 魏
- - よ/广 + お/頁 + に/氵 = 魘

==== Other compounds ====
- - も/門 + に/氵 = 匂
- - れ/口 + に/氵 = 嗜
- - う/宀/#3 + に/氵 = 窪
- - の/禾 + に/氵 = 粍
- - ゆ/彳 + に/氵 = 術
- - ほ/方 + に/氵 + の/禾 = 歿
- - 宿 + 宿 + に/氵 = 埀
