= Braille translator =

Software program used to translate text into braille script

A braille translator is a software program that translates electronic text (such as an MS-Word file) into braille and sends it to a braille peripheral, such as a braille embosser (which produces a hard copy of the newly created braille). Typically, each language needs its own braille translator. Despite the use of the word translator, there is no language translation. Even in the simplest situation, such as Dutch braille, has complex rules for capitalization, emphasis, punctuation, typographic symbols, and page formatting.

== Description ==
For the purposes of this article, the word "inkprint" means text prepared for reading by the eye, whether printed, displayed on a screen, or stored in a computer; "braille" means text prepared for reading by the finger, whether brailled, displayed on an electronic device, or stored in a computer.

Braille translation software or embedded hardware converts inkprint into braille or braille into inkprint. Usually, someone has inkprint in a word processor file or at an URL and wants braille. The braille could be sent to a braille embosser to produce physical braille or to a braille notetaker. Another circumstance is that someone has braille in an electronic braille notetaker that they want to produce in inkprint to be shared with someone who does not read braille.

Braille translation software is usually classified as assistive technology since the action of the software provides braille for a blind person. Braille translators can be run by people with or without sight.

A braille translator can run on a smartphone, personal computer, network server, or (historically) larger mini-computers or mainframes of larger institutions.

Some languages use uncontracted braille, where each letter uses a specific braille character. Uncontracted braille requires manipulation of capitalization, emphasis, numbers, and punctuation. Some languages use contracted braille, where the rules for various braille abbreviations are quite complex. For example, in contracted English braille, the word think (5 letters) is rendered as 3 characters: ⠹⠢⠅ (th)(in)k. The use or non-use of these contractions is related to pronunciation. For example, the "th" sign is used in think, but not pothole. Unless properly programmed, a computer might make a mistake that no person would make, such as using the contraction for mother in the word chemotherapy. The most difficult part of producing braille is making the decision of when and when not to use contractions. When people make these decisions, it is braille transcription; when computers make these decisions, it is braille translation.

== History ==
The first practical application of computer translation and production of braille used mainframe computers at the American Printing House for the Blind of Louisville, Kentucky.

During the 1960s, there was an MIT project to automate the production of braille. Robert Mann wrote and supervised software for braille translation called DOTSYS, while another group created an embossing device which became known as the "M.I.T. Braillemboss.". Eventually, MIT outsourced the software work to Mitre Corporation. The Mitre Corporation team of Robert Gildea, Jonathan Millen, Reid Gerhart and Joseph Sullivan (now president of Duxbury Systems) developed DOTSYS III, the first braille translator written in a portable programming language. DOTSYS III was developed for the Atlanta Public Schools as a public domain program.

At the first International Workshop on Computerized Braille Production, held in Muenster, Germany, March 1973, many braille-translation projects from around the world were described.

An archive of documents on the history of braille, braille translation, and some braille devices is maintained by Duxbury Systems.

== See also ==
- Book
- E-book
- Braille e-book
- Perkins Brailler
