= Braille embosser =

Impact printer that renders text as tactile braille cells

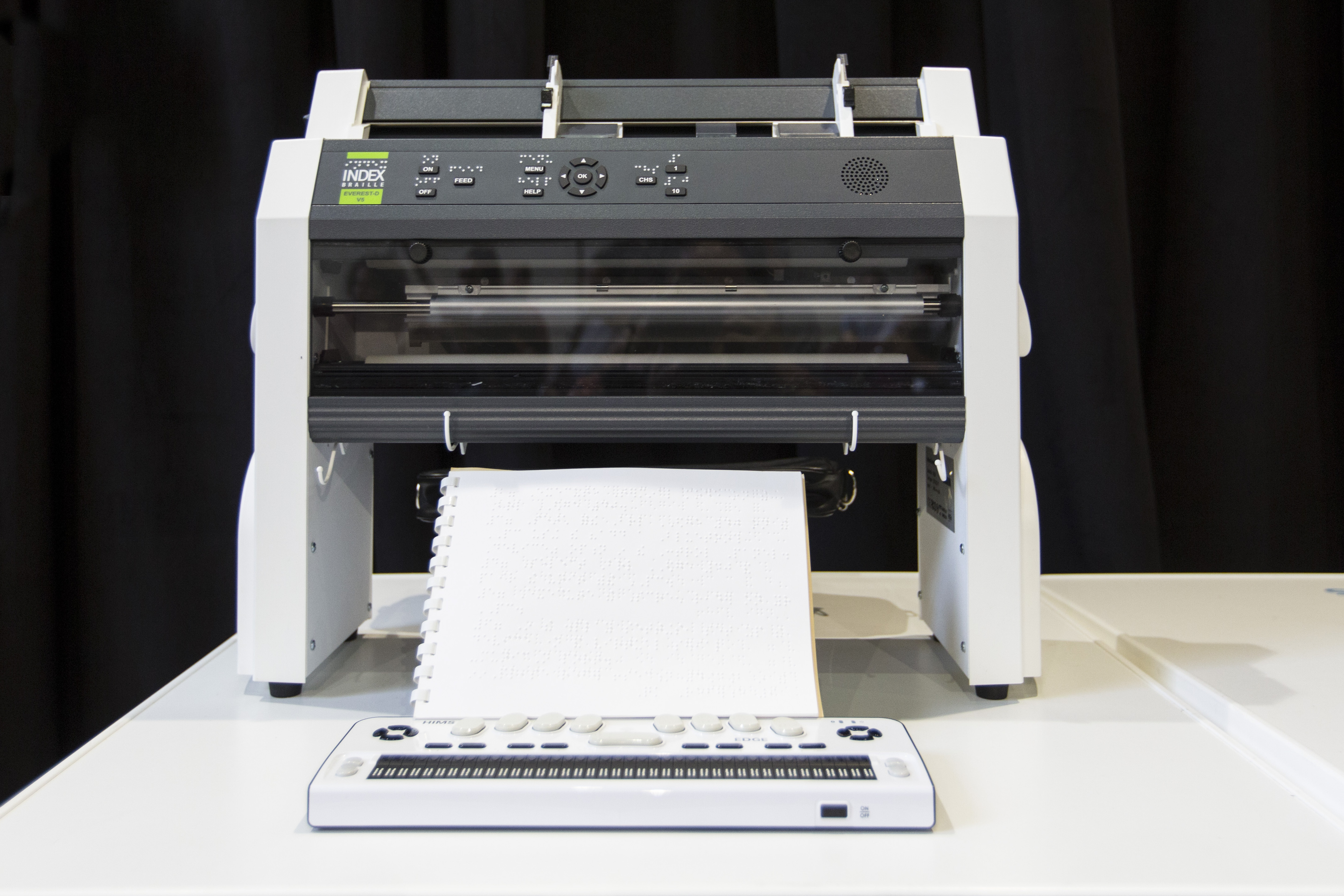
A braille embosser showing some pages created on it.

A braille embosser is an impact printer that renders text as tactile braille cells. Braille is usually embossed on specialized heavyweight paper, since ordinary paper may be too thin to withstand the process. Using braille translation software, a document can be translated into Braille and then embossed with relative ease. Braille embossers can emboss single-sided or double-sided (called interpoint) and can produce 6- or 8-dot Braille.

Braille users may refer to other printers "ink printers", to distinguish them from their braille counterparts. This is often the case regardless of the type of printer being discussed (e.g., thermal printers being called "ink printers" even though they use no ink).

As with ink printers or presses, embossers range from those intended for consumers to those used by large publishers. The price of embossers increases with the volume of braille it produces.

== Types ==
An example of a fast industrial braille embosser is the $92,000 Belgian-made NV Interpoint 55, first produced in 1991, which uses a separate air compressor to drive the embossing head and can output up to 800 braille characters per second. Adoption was slow at first; in 2000 the National Federation of the Blind said there were only three of these in the US, one owned by the NFB itself and the other two by the Watchtower Bible and Tract Society. As of 2008, there are more than 60 in use across the world.

Smaller desktop braille embossers are more common and can be found in libraries, universities, and specialist education centers, as well as being privately owned by blind individuals. It may be necessary to use an acoustic cabinet or hood to dampen the noise level.

Braille embossers usually need special braille paper which is thicker and more expensive than normal paper. Some high-end embossers are capable of printing on normal paper. Embossers can be either one-sided or two-sided. Two-sided embossing requires lining up the dots so they do not overlap (called "interpoint" because the points on the other side are placed in between the points on the first side). Two-sided embossing uses less paper and reduces the size of the output.

thermoform produces copies on soft plastic. However, the resulting braille is not as easily readable as braille that has been freshly embossed, in much the same way that a poor-quality photocopy is not as readable as the original. Hence large publishers do not generally use thermoforms to produce multiple copies of embossed braille. Instead, users with access to a braille file can emboss multiple copies as needed using a braille embosser.

Some embossers can produce "dotty Moon", i.e., Moon type shapes formed by dots.

== History ==
Before the invention of modern embossers, mechanical paper embossers like the Kleidograph, invented in 1894 by William Bell Wait, would raise the paper and create embossed dots. These were widely used in schools for the blind in the U.S. during the late 1800s. However, the language used to transcribe these embossed papers was under the New York Point System, and it wasn't until about 1899 when the first mechanical Braille embosser, the Stainsby "C" Model Shorthand Machine, was made by Henry Stainsby, and Alfred Wayne.

It was not until 1964 when the MIT SAEDC decided to make a device dedicated to becoming a more flexible braille system. This system was named DOTSYS (DOTSYStem) and would have the ability to translate teletypesetter (TTS) tapes into braille. The first prototype system for this was The MIT Brailler which was known to be almost unusable and failed regularly. This led to the MIT BrailleEmboss in 1966 which was able to produce Grade 2 braille based on converted news service tapes. The BrailleEmboss could reach up to 150 Bd on a 42 braille-cell page. It weighed 84kg and cost $6,500.

In 1971, Triformation Systems (or Enabling Technologies today), released their first embosser known as the BD-3. This system was widely used in conjunction with the California Law Enforcement Teletype System (CLETS). Braille embossers by this point became international and companies like Papenmeier in Germany created some of the first refreshable braille displays, the BRAILLEX, that would allow the blind to interact with their computers using Braille which revolutionized the braille embossing industry. This happened in 1975.

In 1976, France contributed to the braille embossing space with the edition of the SAGEM (Soceitie d'Applications Generales d'Electricitie et de Mécanique) machine. The embosser did not start marketing the product until Autumn of that year. That same year in Paris, the first paperless braille machine was invented by Oleg and Andie Tretiakoff which used cassette tapes to store data. This piezo-electric display technology still exists today in the embosser market. Telesensory, the American company of Tretiakoff introduced the Versabraille in 1979, which was the American marketed version of their French prototype. This was allowed to be attached to a computer terminal to allow braille reading. The last embossing machine made during the 1970s was the LED-120 which was introduced in the late 1970s. This was an upgrade to the LED-1 machine released earlier in the decade.

In 1981, Professor Ir. Francois created the single-side Interpoint 30, which was originally just an idea proclaimed to his students back in 1976. He and his students at the University of Leuven in Belgium started the project to make an embosser for the Licht en Liefde charity in Belgium. This would later develop into the double-sided embosser known as the Interpoint 55 which was commercially available in 1991. The Interpoint 55 was advertised and known as one of the fastest braille embossers in the world, with it printing more than 800 characters in a second. This was sold on the market for $77,000 and in 1999, only 3 were made. By 2008, 60 have been produced.

In 2001, ViewPlus Technologies created the Tiger Advantage Embosser which allowed graphic printing using dotted-line graphics to allow the blind to interpret graphics through touch. This was also the first time a braille embosser could print at the same speed as a standard printer. ViewPlus would pair the Tiger Advantage Embosser with the software Braille2000, which introduced the ASCII-braille text through legacy embossers and added a "2 in 1" output of choosing paper size and activating the embosser. Braille2000 only supports Windows 2000.

By 2018, braille embossers were being used outside of computers and had added a bluetooth feature, along with USB compatibility. Embossers were also compatible with Windows, Mac, Linux, iOS, and Android all at once. Some of these products include the BrailleSheet 120, BrailleTrac 120, and Juliet 120.

As of April 2026, the most recent braille embosser on the market is the Braillo 650 SF2 which released around early 2020. This machine can print up to 650 characters a second and allows for USB, Ethernet, and WLAN connections.

== See also ==
- Book – Medium consisting of pages of text or images
- Braigo – Braille embosser using a Lego Mindstorms EV3 kit
- Braille e-book – Refreshable braille display
- Braille translator – Software program used to translate text into braille script
- E-book – Book published in digital form
- Mountbatten Brailler – Brand of electronic Braille typewriter
