= Armenian Braille =

Braille alphabets of the Armenian language

Armenian Braille is either of two braille alphabets used for writing the Armenian language. The assignments of the Armenian alphabet to braille patterns is largely consistent with unified international braille, with the same punctuation, except for the comma. However, Eastern and Western Armenian are assigned braille letters based on different criteria. The conventions for Western Armenian were developed in Lebanon.

== Eastern Armenian Braille ==
Eastern Armenian Braille
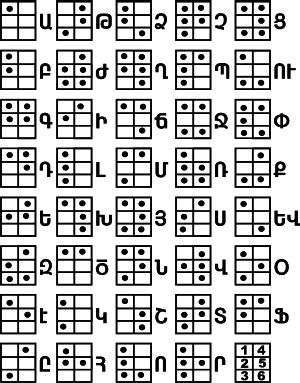
- Script type: alphabet
- Print basis: Armenian alphabet
- Languages: Eastern Armenian

Related scripts
- Parent systems: Braille: ?; Eastern Armenian Braille

In Eastern Armenian, braille cells are assigned international values based on the historical correspondences of the Armenian script. For this reason they closely match the Latin transliteration convention used in the table below.

Linear	Ա ա a	Բ բ b	Գ գ g	Դ դ d	Ե ե e	Զ զ z	Է է ē	Ը ը ë	Թ թ t’	Ժ ժ ž	Ի ի i	Լ լ l	Խ խ x
Braille	⠁	⠃	⠛	⠙	⠚	⠮	⠑	⠌	⠜	⠾	⠊	⠇	⠹
Linear	Ծ ծ ç	Կ կ k	Հ հ h	Ձ ձ j	Ղ ղ ġ	Ճ ճ č̣	Մ մ m	Յ յ y	Ն ն n	Շ շ s	Ո ո o	Չ չ č	Պ պ p
Braille	⠉	⠅	⠓	⠣	⠻	⠩	⠍	⠽	⠝	⠱	⠧	⠟	⠏
Linear	Ջ ջ ǰ	Ռ ռ ṙ	Ս ս s	Վ վ v	Տ տ t	Ր ր r	Ց ց c’	Ւ ւ w	Փ փ p’	Ք ք k’	Եւ և ev	Օ օ ò	Ֆ ֆ f
Braille	⠭	⠷	⠎	⠺	⠞	⠗	⠵	⠥	⠯	⠬	⠡	⠕	⠋

Punctuation
Linear	,	՞
Braille	⠒	⠢

== Western Armenian Braille ==
Western Armenian Braille
- Script type: alphabet
- Print basis: Armenian alphabet
- Languages: Western Armenian

Related scripts
- Parent systems: Braille: ?; Western Armenian Braille

In Western Armenian, braille cells are assigned according to a pronunciation which diverges from the historical origin of the letters. Thus what are transliterated b g d in the table below are assigned braille values as p q th, while p t č̣ k are pronounced like English b d j g and have those braille assignments.

Linear	Ա ա a	Բ բ b	Գ գ g	Դ դ d	Ե ե e	Զ զ z	Է է ē	Ը ը ë	Թ թ t’	Ժ ժ ž	Ի ի i	Լ լ l	Խ խ x
Braille	⠁	⠏	⠟	⠹	⠽	⠵	⠑	⠥	⠞	⠜	⠊	⠇	⠭
Linear	Ծ ծ ç	Կ կ k	Հ հ h	Ձ ձ j	Ղ ղ ġ	Ճ ճ č̣	Մ մ m	Յ յ y	Ն ն n	Շ շ s	Ո ո o	Չ չ č	Պ պ p
Braille	⠌	⠛	⠓	⠬	⠣	⠚	⠍	⠱	⠝	⠩	⠪	⠡	⠃
Linear	Ջ ջ ǰ	Ռ ռ ṙ	Ս ս s	Վ վ v	Տ տ t	Ր ր r	Ց ց c’	Ւ ւ w	Փ փ p’	Ք ք k’	Օ օ ò	Ֆ ֆ f	
Braille	⠉	⠻	⠎	⠧	⠙	⠗	⠮	⠺	⠫	⠅	⠕	⠋	

Punctuation
Linear	,	՞	’
Braille	⠠	⠦	⠄

Եւ (և) is ⠯.

== Common punctuation ==
Apart from the comma and question mark above, Eastern and Western Braille use the same punctuation.

Linear	՝	․	։	՜	« »	֊	(cap)
Braille	⠆	⠒	⠲	⠖	⠦⠀⠴	⠤	⠨

== See also ==
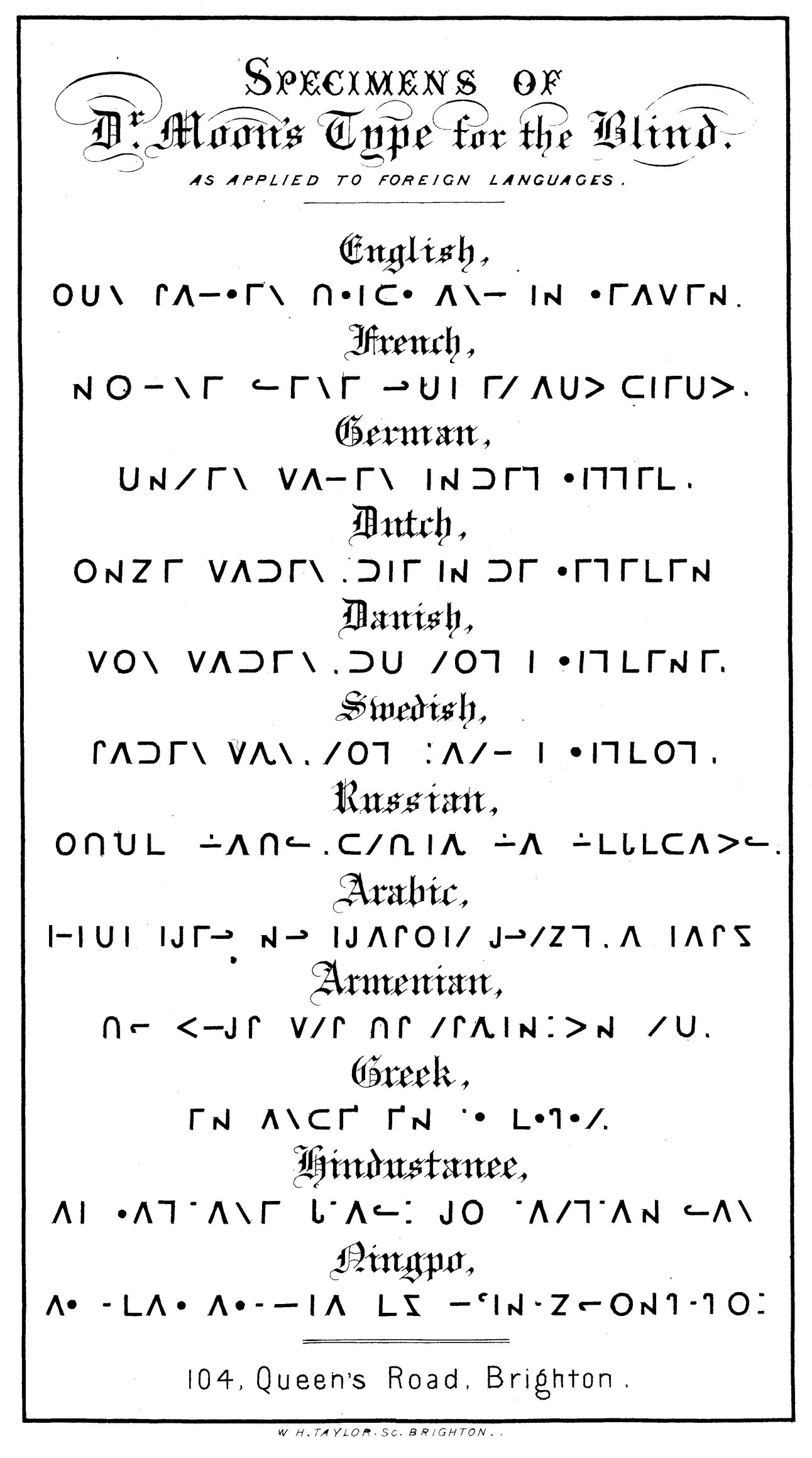
A sample of Moon type in various languages including Armenian.

- Moon type is a simplification of the Latin alphabet for embossing. An adaptation for Armenian-reading blind people has been proposed.
