= Ben (letter) =

Letter of the Armenian alphabet

Armenian letter Ben
- Բ բ

Usage
- Writing system: Armenian alphabet
- Type: Alphabetic
- Language of origin: Armenian
- Sound values: b (Eastern Armenian) pʰ (Western Armenian, in some places in the Eastern)
- In Unicode: U+0532, U+0562
- Alphabetical position: 2nd

History
- Development: Possibly, Β β or Ϝ ϝ: Բ բ
- Time period: Since 405 to present

Other
- Associated numbers: 2

Ben (majuscule: Բ, minuscule: բ; Armenian: բեն) is a letter of the Armenian alphabet, used in the Armenian language.

It was one of the original letters in the Armenian alphabet created by Mesrop Mashtots in 405 AD.

It is speculated to be derived from the Greek letter Beta with the rightmost curves cut off somewhat. Along with the letter Ayb, it forms the word "այբուբեն" (alphabet).

== Usage ==
It is the 2nd letter of the Armenian alphabet, used in the Armenian language. In Eastern Armenian dialect, it is usually pronounced as the voiced bilabial plosive [b], though in some sub-dialects, it can be pronounced as the voiceless bilabial plosive [p], or as the aspirated voiceless bilabial plosive [pʰ]. In the Western Armenian dialect, it is pronounced as the aspirated voiceless bilabial plosive [pʰ]. In English, it is transliterated as the letter B. In the Armenian numeral system, the letter corresponds to the number 2.

== Encodings ==
Character information
Preview	Բ		բ	
Unicode name	ARMENIAN CAPITAL LETTER BEN		ARMENIAN SMALL LETTER BEN	
Encodings	decimal	hex	dec	hex
Unicode	1330	U+0532	1378	U+0562
UTF-8	212 178	D4 B2	213 162	D5 A2
Numeric character reference	&#1330;	&#x532;	&#1378;	&#x562;

== Gallery ==
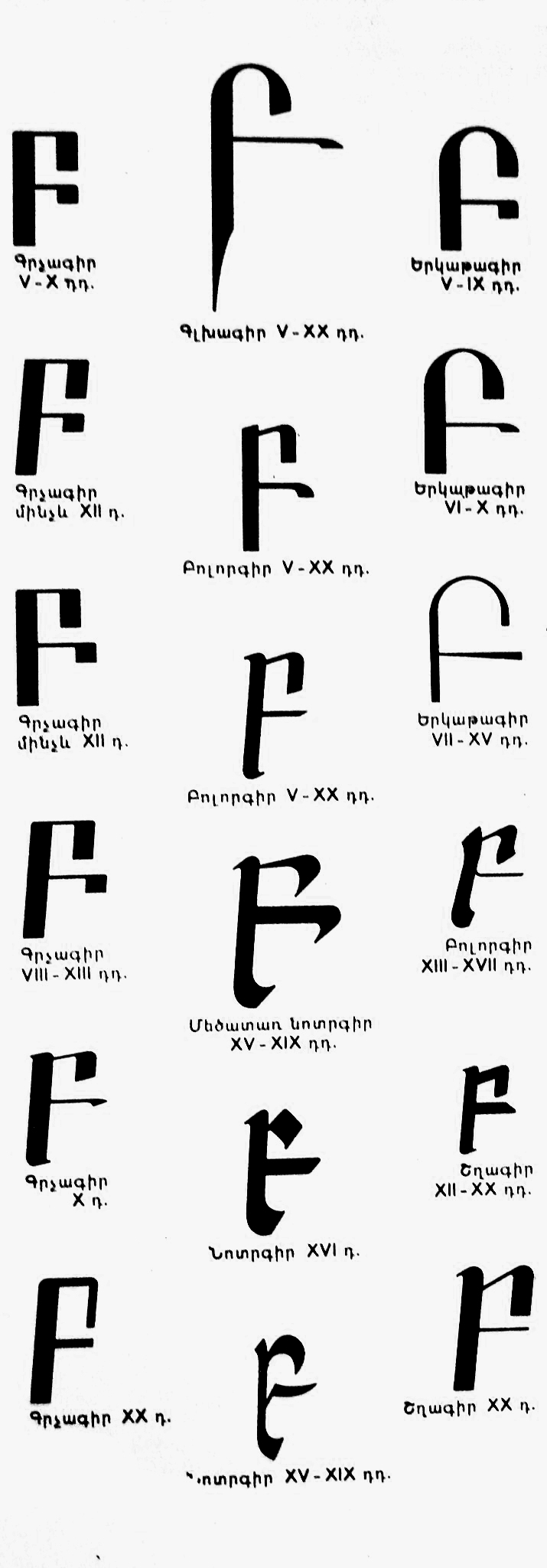
Various historic forms

Rounded Erkat'agir

Angular Erkat'agir

Bolorgir

Notrgir

Shghagir

Typographic form

Handwritten form

Eastern Armenian Braille form Dots-12

Western Armenian Braille form Dots-1234
