= Braille pattern dots-125 =

Braille pattern

6-dot braille cells
| ⠀ | ⠁ | ⠃ | ⠉ | ⠙ | ⠑ | ⠋ | ⠛ | ⠓ | ⠊ | ⠚ | ⠈ | ⠘ |
| ⠄ | ⠅ | ⠇ | ⠍ | ⠝ | ⠕ | ⠏ | ⠟ | ⠗ | ⠎ | ⠞ | ⠌ | ⠜ |
| ⠤ | ⠥ | ⠧ | ⠭ | ⠽ | ⠵ | ⠯ | ⠿ | ⠷ | ⠮ | ⠾ | ⠬ | ⠼ |
| ⠠ | ⠡ | ⠣ | ⠩ | ⠹ | ⠱ | ⠫ | ⠻ | ⠳ | ⠪ | ⠺ | ⠨ | ⠸ |
| shift down | ⠂ | ⠆ | ⠒ | ⠲ | ⠢ | ⠖ | ⠶ | ⠦ | ⠔ | ⠴ | ⠐ | ⠰ |

The Braille pattern dots-125 ( ⠓ ) is a 6-dot braille cell with the top left and both middle dots raised, or an 8-dot braille cell with the top left and both upper-middle dots raised. It is represented by the Unicode code point U+2813, and in Braille ASCII with H.

Character information
| Preview | ⠓ (braille pattern dots-125) | |
|---|---|---|
| Unicode name | BRAILLE PATTERN DOTS-125 | |
| Encodings | decimal | hex |
| Unicode | 10259 | U+2813 |
| UTF-8 | 226 160 147 | E2 A0 93 |
| Numeric character reference | &#10259; | &#x2813; |
| Braille ASCII | 72 | 48 |

== Unified Braille ==
In unified international braille, the braille pattern dots-125 is used to represent guttural fricatives and approximants, such as /h/, /ħ/, or /ɦ/, and is otherwise assigned as needed. It is also used for the number 8.

=== Table of unified braille values ===
| French Braille | H, "sur" |
| English Braille | H |
| English Contraction | have |
| German Braille | H |
| Armenian Braille | Հ |
| Bharati Braille | ह / ਹ / હ / হ / ହ / హ / ಹ / ഹ / ஹ / හ / ہ |
| Icelandic Braille | H |
| IPA Braille | /h/ |
| Russian Braille | Х |
| Slovak Braille | H |
| Arabic Braille | ه |
| Persian Braille | ه |
| Irish Braille | H, dot accent |
| Thai Braille | ห h |
| Luxembourgish Braille | h (minuscule) |

== Other braille ==
| Japanese Braille | ri / り / リ |
| Korean Braille | t- / ㅌ |
| Mainland Chinese Braille | h/x |
| Taiwanese Braille | z / ㄗ |
| Two-Cell Chinese Braille | xi- -ào / 要 yào |
| Nemeth Braille | not an independent sign |
| Algerian Braille | د |

== Plus dots 7 and 8 ==
Related to Braille pattern dots-125 are Braille patterns 1257, 1258, and 12578, which are used in 8-dot braille systems, such as Gardner-Salinas and Luxembourgish Braille.

Character information
| Preview | ⡓ (braille pattern dots-1257) | | ⢓ (braille pattern dots-1258) | | ⣓ (braille pattern dots-12578) | |
|---|---|---|---|---|---|---|
| Unicode name | BRAILLE PATTERN DOTS-1257 | | BRAILLE PATTERN DOTS-1258 | | BRAILLE PATTERN DOTS-12578 | |
| Encodings | decimal | hex | dec | hex | dec | hex |
| Unicode | 10323 | U+2853 | 10387 | U+2893 | 10451 | U+28D3 |
| UTF-8 | 226 161 147 | E2 A1 93 | 226 162 147 | E2 A2 93 | 226 163 147 | E2 A3 93 |
| Numeric character reference | &#10323; | &#x2853; | &#10387; | &#x2893; | &#10451; | &#x28D3; |

| | dots 1257 | dots 1258 | dots 12578 |
|---|---|---|---|
| Gardner Salinas Braille | H (capital) | ∞ (infinity) | |
| Luxembourgish Braille | H (capital) | | |

== Related 8-dot kantenji patterns ==
In the Japanese kantenji braille, the standard 8-dot Braille patterns 236, 1236, 2346, and 12346 are the patterns related to Braille pattern dots-125, since the two additional dots of kantenji patterns 0125, 1257, and 01257 are placed above the base 6-dot cell, instead of below, as in standard 8-dot braille.

Character information
| Preview | ⠦ (braille pattern dots-236) | | ⠧ (braille pattern dots-1236) | | ⠮ (braille pattern dots-2346) | | ⠯ (braille pattern dots-12346) | |
|---|---|---|---|---|---|---|---|---|
| Unicode name | BRAILLE PATTERN DOTS-236 | | BRAILLE PATTERN DOTS-1236 | | BRAILLE PATTERN DOTS-2346 | | BRAILLE PATTERN DOTS-12346 | |
| Encodings | decimal | hex | dec | hex | dec | hex | dec | hex |
| Unicode | 10278 | U+2826 | 10279 | U+2827 | 10286 | U+282E | 10287 | U+282F |
| UTF-8 | 226 160 166 | E2 A0 A6 | 226 160 167 | E2 A0 A7 | 226 160 174 | E2 A0 AE | 226 160 175 | E2 A0 AF |
| Numeric character reference | &#10278; | &#x2826; | &#10279; | &#x2827; | &#10286; | &#x282E; | &#10287; | &#x282F; |

=== Kantenji using braille patterns 236, 1236, 2346, or 12346 ===
This listing includes kantenji using Braille pattern dots-125 for all 6349 kanji found in JIS C 6226-1978.

- - 分

==== Variants and thematic compounds ====
- - り/分 + selector 1 = 今
- - selector 5 + り/分 = 帚
- - selector 6 + り/分 = 僉
- - 数 + #8 = 八
- - 比 + り/分 = 里

==== Compounds of 分 ====
- - い/糹/#2 + り/分 = 紛
- - を/貝 + り/分 = 貪
- - ち/竹 + り/分 = 雰
- - お/頁 + り/分 = 頒
- - り/分 + の/禾 = 粉
  - - と/戸 + り/分 + の/禾 = 彜
- - り/分 + を/貝 = 貧
- - や/疒 + り/分 + selector 1 = 岑
- - ね/示 + り/分 + selector 1 = 衾
- - よ/广 + り/分 + selector 1 = 矜
- - れ/口 + 宿 + り/分 = 吩
- - や/疒 + う/宀/#3 + り/分 = 岔
- - り/分 + 宿 + 心 = 忿
- - て/扌 + 宿 + り/分 = 扮
- - 心 + 龸 + り/分 = 枌
- - り/分 + も/門 + selector 1 = 氛
- - に/氵 + 宿 + り/分 = 汾
- - ま/石 + 宿 + り/分 = 竕
- - く/艹 + 宿 + り/分 = 芬

==== Compounds of 今 ====
- - れ/口 + り/分 = 吟
- - り/分 + れ/口 = 含
  - - く/艹 + り/分 + れ/口 = 莟
- - り/分 + 心 = 念
  - - き/木 + り/分 + 心 = 棯
  - - の/禾 + り/分 + 心 = 稔
  - - せ/食 + り/分 + 心 = 鯰
- - し/巿 + り/分 + selector 1 = 黔

==== Compounds of 帚 ====
- - ふ/女 + り/分 = 婦
- - ん/止 + り/分 = 帰
- - て/扌 + り/分 = 掃
- - く/艹 + selector 5 + り/分 = 菷
- - ち/竹 + 宿 + り/分 = 箒
- - ん/止 + ん/止 + り/分 = 歸

==== Compounds of 僉 ====
- - や/疒 + り/分 = 嶮
- - り/分 + 氷/氵 = 斂
  - - に/氵 + り/分 + 氷/氵 = 瀲
- - ん/止 + selector 6 + り/分 = 歛
- - ち/竹 + selector 6 + り/分 = 簽
- - 仁/亻 + 仁/亻 + り/分 = 儉
- - も/門 + 宿 + り/分 = 匳
- - き/木 + き/木 + り/分 = 檢
- - ⺼ + 宿 + り/分 = 臉
- - さ/阝 + さ/阝 + り/分 = 險
- - そ/馬 + そ/馬 + り/分 = 驗
- - り/分 + れ/口 + れ/口 = 龠
  - - か/金 + 宿 + り/分 = 鑰

==== Compounds of 八 ====
- - う/宀/#3 + り/分 = 穴
  - - い/糹/#2 + う/宀/#3 + り/分 = 穽
  - - こ/子 + う/宀/#3 + り/分 = 窖
  - - か/金 + う/宀/#3 + り/分 = 窩
  - - 火 + う/宀/#3 + り/分 = 竃
  - - 氷/氵 + う/宀/#3 + り/分 = 竅
  - - つ/土 + う/宀/#3 + り/分 = 竇
  - - ひ/辶 + う/宀/#3 + り/分 = 邃
- - 囗 + り/分 = 興
  - - 火 + 囗 + り/分 = 爨
  - - せ/食 + 囗 + り/分 = 釁
- - れ/口 + 数 + り/分 = 叭
- - か/金 + 数 + り/分 = 釟

==== Compounds of 里 ====
- - よ/广 + り/分 = 厘
  - - か/金 + よ/广 + り/分 = 甅
  - - ま/石 + よ/广 + り/分 = 竰
  - - き/木 + よ/广 + り/分 = 釐
- - へ/⺩ + り/分 = 理
- - ま/石 + り/分 = 童
  - - る/忄 + り/分 = 憧
  - - か/金 + り/分 = 鐘
  - - な/亻 + ま/石 + り/分 = 僮
  - - し/巿 + ま/石 + り/分 = 幢
  - - て/扌 + ま/石 + り/分 = 撞
  - - き/木 + ま/石 + り/分 = 橦
  - - に/氵 + ま/石 + り/分 = 潼
  - - ふ/女 + ま/石 + り/分 = 艟
- - 龸 + り/分 = 重
  - - な/亻 + り/分 = 働
  - - の/禾 + り/分 = 種
  - - ゆ/彳 + り/分 = 衝
  - - り/分 + ぬ/力 = 動
    - - る/忄 + り/分 + ぬ/力 = 慟
  - - ⺼ + 龸 + り/分 = 腫
  - - く/艹 + 龸 + り/分 = 董
  - - み/耳 + 龸 + り/分 = 踵
  - - か/金 + 龸 + り/分 = 鍾
- - つ/土 + り/分 = 埋
- - 日 + り/分 = 量
- - せ/食 + り/分 = 鯉
- - り/分 + ね/示 = 裏
- - り/分 + よ/广 = 野
  - - つ/土 + り/分 + よ/广 = 墅
- - な/亻 + 比 + り/分 = 俚
- - れ/口 + 比 + り/分 = 哩
- - に/氵 + 比 + り/分 = 浬
- - け/犬 + 比 + り/分 = 狸
- - ね/示 + 比 + り/分 = 裡
- - そ/馬 + 比 + り/分 = 貍
  - - ち/竹 + 比 + り/分 = 霾

==== Other compounds ====
- - 仁/亻 + り/分 = 倹
- - き/木 + り/分 = 検
- - さ/阝 + り/分 = 険
- - そ/馬 + り/分 = 験
- - ん/止 + 宿 + り/分 = 鹸
- - く/艹 + り/分 = 兵
  - - に/氵 + り/分 = 浜
  - - き/木 + く/艹 + り/分 = 梹
  - - か/金 + く/艹 + り/分 = 鋲
- - り/分 + え/訁 = 会
  - - 心 + り/分 = 桧
- - り/分 + も/門 = 余
  - - り/分 + と/戸 = 斜
  - - り/分 + ゑ/訁 = 叙
    - - selector 1 + り/分 + ゑ/訁 = 敍
    - - り/分 + り/分 + ゑ/訁 = 敘
  - - た/⽥ + り/分 + も/門 = 畭
  - - 心 + り/分 + も/門 = 荼
  - - む/車 + り/分 + も/門 = 蜍
  - - り/分 + り/分 + も/門 = 餘
  - - り/分 + り/分 + も/門 = 餘
- - り/分 + か/金 = 平
  - - り/分 + つ/土 = 坪
  - - え/訁 + り/分 = 評
  - - や/疒 + り/分 + か/金 = 岼
  - - る/忄 + り/分 + か/金 = 怦
  - - に/氵 + り/分 + か/金 = 泙
    - - く/艹 + り/分 + か/金 = 萍
  - - の/禾 + り/分 + か/金 = 秤
  - - 心 + り/分 + か/金 = 苹
  - - せ/食 + り/分 + か/金 = 鮃
- - り/分 + へ/⺩ = 全
  - - ゑ/訁 + り/分 = 詮
  - - き/木 + り/分 + へ/⺩ = 栓
  - - や/疒 + り/分 + へ/⺩ = 痊
  - - ち/竹 + り/分 + へ/⺩ = 筌
  - - か/金 + り/分 + へ/⺩ = 銓
  - - 火 + 宿 + り/分 = 竈
- - り/分 + ⺼ = 益
  - - 氷/氵 + り/分 = 溢
  - - え/訁 + り/分 + ⺼ = 謚
  - - か/金 + り/分 + ⺼ = 鎰
  - - り/分 + 宿 + せ/食 = 鷁
- - り/分 + せ/食 = 舎
  - - り/分 + ほ/方 = 舗
  - - り/分 + り/分 + せ/食 = 舍
    - - り/分 + り/分 + ほ/方 = 舖
  - - り/分 + selector 4 + よ/广 = 舒
- - た/⽥ + り/分 = 典
  - - き/木 + た/⽥ + り/分 = 椣
  - - ⺼ + た/⽥ + り/分 = 腆
- - し/巿 + り/分 = 幌
- - け/犬 + り/分 = 猪
  - - に/氵 + け/犬 + り/分 = 潴
- - け/犬 + う/宀/#3 + り/分 = 豬
- - め/目 + り/分 = 窺
- - す/発 + り/分 = 罹
- - り/分 + お/頁 = 倉
  - - や/疒 + り/分 + お/頁 = 瘡
  - - ふ/女 + り/分 + お/頁 = 艙
  - - く/艹 + り/分 + お/頁 = 蒼
  - - み/耳 + り/分 + お/頁 = 蹌
  - - か/金 + り/分 + お/頁 = 鎗
  - - る/忄 + り/分 + お/頁 = 愴
  - - て/扌 + り/分 + お/頁 = 搶
  - - き/木 + り/分 + お/頁 = 槍
  - - に/氵 + り/分 + お/頁 = 滄
- - り/分 + な/亻 = 傘
- - り/分 + け/犬 = 兼
  - - る/忄 + り/分 + け/犬 = 慊
  - - ん/止 + り/分 + け/犬 = 歉
  - - 心 + り/分 + け/犬 = 蒹
  - - を/貝 + り/分 + け/犬 = 賺
- - り/分 + 囗 = 合
  - - れ/口 + り/分 + 囗 = 哈
  - - ふ/女 + り/分 + 囗 = 姶
  - - や/疒 + り/分 + 囗 = 峇
  - - る/忄 + り/分 + 囗 = 恰
  - - て/扌 + り/分 + 囗 = 拿
  - - ん/止 + り/分 + 囗 = 歙
  - - に/氵 + り/分 + 囗 = 洽
  - - ⺼ + り/分 + 囗 = 盒
  - - ち/竹 + り/分 + 囗 = 箚
  - - の/禾 + り/分 + 囗 = 粭
  - - 心 + り/分 + 囗 = 荅
  - - む/車 + り/分 + 囗 = 蛤
  - - ね/示 + り/分 + 囗 = 袷
  - - も/門 + り/分 + 囗 = 閤
  - - と/戸 + り/分 + 囗 = 鞳
  - - ま/石 + り/分 + 囗 = 龕
  - - り/分 + む/車 + selector 2 = 翕
  - - り/分 + 龸 + せ/食 = 鴿
- - り/分 + さ/阝 = 命
  - - て/扌 + り/分 + さ/阝 = 掵
- - り/分 + 日 = 昌
  - - な/亻 + り/分 + 日 = 倡
  - - ふ/女 + り/分 + 日 = 娼
  - - き/木 + り/分 + 日 = 椙
  - - け/犬 + り/分 + 日 = 猖
  - - 心 + り/分 + 日 = 菖
- - り/分 + め/目 = 穿
- - り/分 + り/分 + え/訁 = 會
  - - け/犬 + り/分 + え/訁 = 獪
  - - ⺼ + り/分 + え/訁 = 膾
  - - く/艹 + り/分 + え/訁 = 薈
  - - せ/食 + り/分 + え/訁 = 鱠
  - - 心 + 心 + り/分 = 檜
- - り/分 + 仁/亻 + 宿 = 个
- - り/分 + 宿 + 宿 = 兜
- - り/分 + 宿 + も/門 = 兮
- - そ/馬 + 数 + り/分 = 尓
- - に/氵 + に/氵 + り/分 = 濱
- - り/分 + 宿 + き/木 = 禽
  - - 心 + 宿 + り/分 = 檎
