= Ayb (letter) =

Letter in the Armenian alphabet

- Ա ա

Usage
- Writing system: Armenian script
- Type: Alphabetic
- Language of origin: Armenian language
- Sound values: ɑ
- In Unicode: U+0531, U+0561
- Alphabetical position: 1

History
- Development: Possibly, Α α: Ա ա
- Time period: 405 to present
- Transliterations: A

Other
- Associated numbers: 1

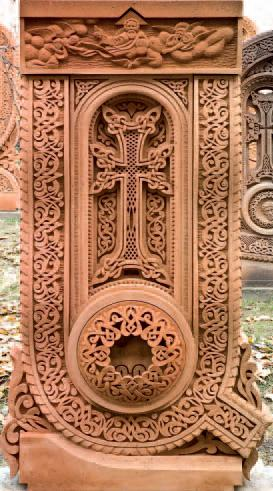
Khachkar in the shape of letter Ա

Ayb (majuscule: Ա; minuscule: ա; Armenian: այբ) is the first letter of the Armenian alphabet. It has a numerical value of 1. It represents the [ɑ] sound in both varieties of the Armenian language. This letter and the letter Ben (Բբ) are the two first letters in the Armenian alphabet and forms the etymology of the Armenian word այբուբեն (aybuben), meaning "alphabet." It is one of the letters originally created by Mesrop Mashtots in the 5th century.

Its prototype is considered to be the Greek letter α (alpha) with the upper arc cut off. A number of Armenian letters are formed in a similar fashion.

It is homoglyphic to the IPA symbol for the close back unrounded vowel, the Cyrillic letter Sha (Шш), the former Zhuang letter Ɯɯ used from 1957 to 1986, and the Nushkuri form of the Georgian letter oni.

== Distribution ==
The letter Ա is the most common letter in the Armenian alphabet. It occurs mainly in initial or medial word positions and very rarely in final position. This is explained by the fact that the Proto-Armenian language lost word-final vowels in multisyllabic words.

== Meanings ==
As a unit, it is a symbol of God. This is because the words God—"Աստված", ⟨Astvadz (W.A.), Astvac (E.A.)⟩—and Creator—"Արարիչ", ⟨Ararich⟩—begin with it. Thus, the symbolism of it corresponds to the Greek letter "alpha" in the Book of Revelation, where the Lord says, "I am Alpha and Omega, the beginning and the end." (Revelation 1:8).

== Computing codes ==
Character information
Preview	Ա		ա	
Unicode name	ARMENIAN CAPITAL LETTER AYB		ARMENIAN SMALL LETTER AYB	
Encodings	decimal	hex	dec	hex
Unicode	1329	U+0531	1377	U+0561
UTF-8	212 177	D4 B1	213 161	D5 A1
Numeric character reference	&#1329;	&#x531;	&#1377;	&#x561;

== Related characters and other similar characters ==
Similar characters

- ⴍ : Nuskhuri variant of the Georgian letter Oni
- Ш ш : Cyrillic letter Sha
- Ɯ ɯ : Turned M
- ɯ : Close back unrounded vowel

Related letters:

- A a : Latin letter A
- А а : Cyrillic letter A
- ა : Georgian letter Ani
- Α α : Greek alpha

== Gallery ==
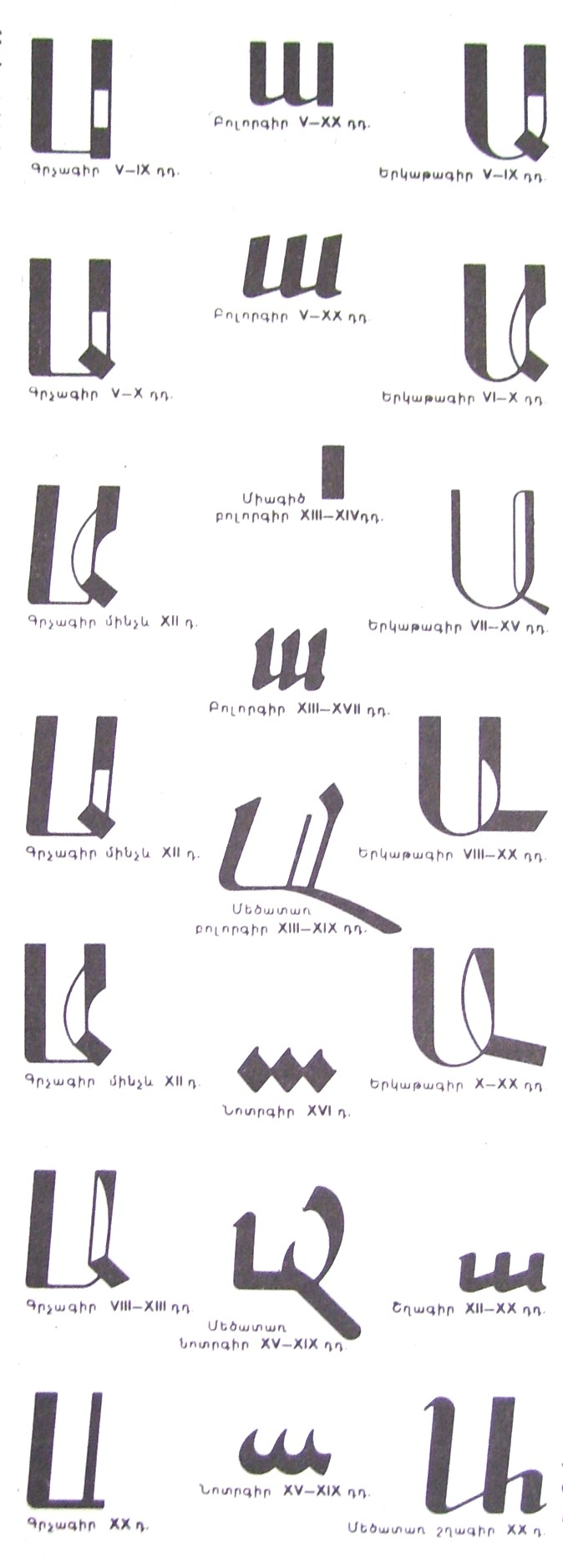
Various historic forms

Rounded Erkat'agir

Angular Erkat'agir

Bolorgir

Notrgir

Shghagir

Typographic form

Handwritten form

Braille form Dots-1

== See also ==
- Armenian alphabet
- Mesrop Mashtots
- Ben (letter)
