= Braille pattern dots-145 =

Braille pattern

6-dot braille cells
⠀	⠁	⠃	⠉	⠙	⠑	⠋	⠛	⠓	⠊	⠚	⠈	⠘
⠄	⠅	⠇	⠍	⠝	⠕	⠏	⠟	⠗	⠎	⠞	⠌	⠜
⠤	⠥	⠧	⠭	⠽	⠵	⠯	⠿	⠷	⠮	⠾	⠬	⠼
⠠	⠡	⠣	⠩	⠹	⠱	⠫	⠻	⠳	⠪	⠺	⠨	⠸
shift down	⠂	⠆	⠒	⠲	⠢	⠖	⠶	⠦	⠔	⠴	⠐	⠰

The Braille pattern dots-145 ( ⠙ ) is a 6-dot braille cell with both top and the middle right dots raised, or an 8-dot braille cell with both top and the upper-middle right dots raised. It is represented by the Unicode code point U+2819, and in Braille ASCII with D.

Character information
Preview	⠙ (braille pattern dots-145)	
Unicode name	BRAILLE PATTERN DOTS-145	
Encodings	decimal	hex
Unicode	10265	U+2819
UTF-8	226 160 153	E2 A0 99
Numeric character reference	&#10265;	&#x2819;
Braille ASCII	68	44

== Unified Braille ==
In unified international braille, the braille pattern dots-145 is used to represent a voiced dental or alveolar plosive, such as /d/ or /d̪/, and is otherwise assigned as needed.

=== Table of unified braille values ===
French Braille	D, "de"
English Braille	D
English Contraction	do
German Braille	D
Bharati Braille	द / ਦ / દ / দ / ଦ / ద / ದ / ദ / ද / د
Icelandic Braille	D
IPA Braille	/d/
Russian Braille	Д
Slovak Braille	D
Arabic Braille	د
Persian Braille	د
Irish Braille	D
Thai Braille	ด d
Luxembourgish Braille	d (minuscule)

== Other braille ==
Japanese Braille	ru / る / ル
Korean Braille	p- / ㅍ
Mainland Chinese Braille	D
Taiwanese Braille	d / ㄉ
Two-Cell Chinese Braille	z- -àng, 在 zài
Nemeth Braille	not an independent sign
Algerian Braille	ث

== Plus dots 7 and 8 ==
Related to Braille pattern dots-145 are Braille patterns 1457, 1458, and 14578, which are used in 8-dot braille systems, such as Gardner-Salinas and Luxembourgish Braille.

Character information
Preview	⡙ (braille pattern dots-1457)		⢙ (braille pattern dots-1458)		⣙ (braille pattern dots-14578)	
Unicode name	BRAILLE PATTERN DOTS-1457		BRAILLE PATTERN DOTS-1458		BRAILLE PATTERN DOTS-14578	
Encodings	decimal	hex	dec	hex	dec	hex
Unicode	10329	U+2859	10393	U+2899	10457	U+28D9
UTF-8	226 161 153	E2 A1 99	226 162 153	E2 A2 99	226 163 153	E2 A3 99
Numeric character reference	&#10329;	&#x2859;	&#10393;	&#x2899;	&#10457;	&#x28D9;

	dots 1457	dots 1458	dots 14578
Gardner Salinas Braille	D (capital)	δ (delta)	Δ (Delta)
Luxembourgish Braille	D (capital)		

== Related 8-dot kantenji patterns ==
In the Japanese kantenji braille, the standard 8-dot Braille patterns 256, 1256, 2456, and 12456 are the patterns related to Braille pattern dots-145, since the two additional dots of kantenji patterns 0145, 1457, and 01457 are placed above the base 6-dot cell, instead of below, as in standard 8-dot braille.

Character information
Preview	⠲ (braille pattern dots-256)		⠳ (braille pattern dots-1256)		⠺ (braille pattern dots-2456)		⠻ (braille pattern dots-12456)	
Unicode name	BRAILLE PATTERN DOTS-256		BRAILLE PATTERN DOTS-1256		BRAILLE PATTERN DOTS-2456		BRAILLE PATTERN DOTS-12456	
Encodings	decimal	hex	dec	hex	dec	hex	dec	hex
Unicode	10290	U+2832	10291	U+2833	10298	U+283A	10299	U+283B
UTF-8	226 160 178	E2 A0 B2	226 160 179	E2 A0 B3	226 160 186	E2 A0 BA	226 160 187	E2 A0 BB
Numeric character reference	&#10290;	&#x2832;	&#10291;	&#x2833;	&#10298;	&#x283A;	&#10299;	&#x283B;

=== Kantenji using braille patterns 256, 1256, 2456, or 12456 ===
This listing includes kantenji using Braille pattern dots-145 for all 6349 kanji found in JIS C 6226-1978.

- - 性

==== Variants and thematic compounds ====
- - る/忄 + selector 1 = 壱
- - selector 4 + る/忄 = 甘
- - selector 5 + る/忄 = 侖
- - selector 6 + る/忄 = 婁
- - 数 + #4 = 四

==== Compounds of 性 and 忄 ====
- - る/忄 + ほ/方 = 忙
- - る/忄 + て/扌 = 快
- - る/忄 + お/頁 = 怏
- - る/忄 + し/巿 = 怖
- - る/忄 + け/犬 = 怪
- - る/忄 + こ/子 = 怯
- - る/忄 + ⺼ = 恤
- - る/忄 + や/疒 = 恨
- - る/忄 + 龸 = 悋
- - る/忄 + か/金 = 悍
- - る/忄 + は/辶 = 悔
- - る/忄 + む/車 = 悛
- - る/忄 + れ/口 = 悟
- - る/忄 + 宿 = 悦
- - る/忄 + ち/竹 = 悩
- - る/忄 + と/戸 = 悼
- - る/忄 + せ/食 = 情
- - る/忄 + 心 = 惚
- - る/忄 + ね/示 = 惜
- - る/忄 + い/糹/#2 = 惟
- - る/忄 + う/宀/#3 = 惨
- - る/忄 + ら/月 = 惰
- - る/忄 + ぬ/力 = 惻
- - る/忄 + ゆ/彳 = 愉
- - る/忄 + に/氵 = 慄
- - る/忄 + く/艹 = 慌
- - る/忄 + め/目 = 慎
- - る/忄 + ま/石 = 慢
- - る/忄 + つ/土 = 慣
- - る/忄 + 仁/亻 = 慨
- - る/忄 + そ/馬 = 憎
- - る/忄 + の/禾 = 憐
- - る/忄 + ふ/女 = 憤
- - る/忄 + り/分 = 憧
- - る/忄 + も/門 = 憫
- - る/忄 + な/亻 = 憶
- - る/忄 + ひ/辶 = 憾
- - る/忄 + 囗 = 懊
- - る/忄 + る/忄 = 懐
  - - る/忄 + る/忄 + る/忄 = 懷
- - る/忄 + 比 + し/巿 = 忖
- - る/忄 + そ/馬 + selector 4 = 忤
- - る/忄 + 宿 + お/頁 = 忰
- - る/忄 + 宿 + 龸 = 忱
- - る/忄 + selector 3 + そ/馬 = 忸
- - る/忄 + 比 + を/貝 = 忻
- - る/忄 + 日 = 恒
- - る/忄 + み/耳 = 懺
- - る/忄 + る/忄 = 懐
- - る/忄 + も/門 + selector 5 = 怐
- - る/忄 + 日 + selector 1 = 怕
- - る/忄 + れ/口 + ろ/十 = 怙
- - る/忄 + selector 4 + 日 = 怛
- - る/忄 + 仁/亻 + ろ/十 = 怜
- - る/忄 + selector 4 + な/亻 = 怡
- - る/忄 + り/分 + か/金 = 怦
- - る/忄 + と/戸 + 仁/亻 = 怩
- - る/忄 + 宿 + め/目 = 怫
- - る/忄 + 氷/氵 + selector 4 = 怺
- - る/忄 + 日 + す/発 = 恂
- - る/忄 + つ/土 + し/巿 = 恃
- - る/忄 + 宿 + ぬ/力 = 恊
- - る/忄 + 龸 + selector 2 = 恍
- - る/忄 + 宿 + も/門 = 恟
- - る/忄 + ろ/十 + つ/土 = 恠
- - る/忄 + よ/广 + 火 = 恢
- - る/忄 + る/忄 + 日 = 恆
- - る/忄 + る/忄 + ち/竹 = 惱
- - る/忄 + る/忄 + め/目 = 愼
- - る/忄 + る/忄 + う/宀/#3 = 慘
- - selector 1 + る/忄 + み/耳 = 懴
- - る/忄 + す/発 + れ/口 = 恪
- - る/忄 + 囗 + と/戸 = 恫
- - る/忄 + れ/口 + せ/食 = 恬
- - る/忄 + り/分 + 囗 = 恰
- - る/忄 + 宿 + ら/月 = 悁
- - る/忄 + 囗 + き/木 = 悃
- - る/忄 + そ/馬 + ⺼ = 悄
- - る/忄 + ゆ/彳 + 宿 = 悌
- - る/忄 + 囗 + ひ/辶 = 悒
- - る/忄 + 宿 + ろ/十 = 悖
- - る/忄 + ぬ/力 + 宿 = 悗
- - る/忄 + き/木 + 数 = 悚
- - る/忄 + の/禾 + ぬ/力 = 悧
- - る/忄 + お/頁 + ろ/十 = 悴
- - る/忄 + selector 4 + と/戸 = 悵
- - る/忄 + の/禾 + こ/子 = 悸
- - る/忄 + ふ/女 + さ/阝 = 悽
- - る/忄 + 囗 + つ/土 = 惆
- - る/忄 + 龸 + こ/子 = 惇
- - る/忄 + け/犬 + さ/阝 = 惓
- - る/忄 + selector 5 + ほ/方 = 惘
- - る/忄 + を/貝 + selector 5 = 惧
- - る/忄 + 宿 + の/禾 = 惴
- - る/忄 + 日 + へ/⺩ = 惶
- - る/忄 + 日 + い/糹/#2 = 惺
- - る/忄 + の/禾 + 火 = 愀
- - る/忄 + う/宀/#3 + 日 = 愃
- - る/忄 + 宿 + す/発 = 愎
- - る/忄 + 宿 + け/犬 = 愕
- - る/忄 + 宿 + こ/子 = 愡
- - る/忄 + お/頁 + に/氵 = 愧
- - る/忄 + り/分 + お/頁 = 愴
- - る/忄 + も/門 + selector 1 = 愾
- - る/忄 + り/分 + け/犬 = 慊
- - る/忄 + 宿 + ⺼ = 慍
- - る/忄 + に/氵 + ね/示 = 慓
- - る/忄 + 龸 + む/車 = 慚
- - る/忄 + り/分 + ぬ/力 = 慟
- - る/忄 + は/辶 + く/艹 = 慥
- - る/忄 + 宿 + 数 = 慯
- - る/忄 + 宿 + て/扌 = 慱
- - る/忄 + つ/土 + す/発 = 慳
- - る/忄 + む/車 + 日 = 慴
- - る/忄 + よ/广 + 囗 = 慵
- - る/忄 + よ/广 + ゆ/彳 = 慷
- - る/忄 + い/糹/#2 + 火 = 憔
- - る/忄 + れ/口 + れ/口 = 憚
- - る/忄 + 日 + れ/口 = 憬
- - る/忄 + む/車 + 火 = 憮
- - る/忄 + 宿 + 日 = 憺
- - る/忄 + れ/口 + う/宀/#3 = 懆
- - る/忄 + 囗 + そ/馬 = 懈
- - る/忄 + 宿 + た/⽥ = 懌
- - る/忄 + 囗 + れ/口 = 懍
- - る/忄 + ち/竹 + の/禾 = 懦
- - る/忄 + お/頁 + 数 = 懶
- - る/忄 + 宿 + い/糹/#2 = 懼
- - る/忄 + 龸 + け/犬 = 懽
- - る/忄 + み/耳 + み/耳 = 懾

==== Compounds of 㣺 and 心 ====
- - 仁/亻 + る/忄 = 偲
- - れ/口 + る/忄 = 唸
- - き/木 + る/忄 = 忌
- - け/犬 + る/忄 = 忝
- - こ/子 + る/忄 = 恭
- - そ/馬 + る/忄 = 惣
- - く/艹 + る/忄 = 慕
- - め/目 + る/忄 = 懸
- - て/扌 + る/忄 = 捻
- - 氷/氵 + る/忄 = 添
- - の/禾 + る/忄 = 穏
- - さ/阝 + る/忄 = 隠
- - る/忄 + selector 6 + さ/阝 = 怎
- - る/忄 + 仁/亻 + に/氵 = 恁
- - る/忄 + 氷/氵 + ん/止 = 恣
- - る/忄 + な/亻 + き/木 = 恷
- - る/忄 + ろ/十 + め/目 = 悳
- - る/忄 + け/犬 + 日 = 惷
- - る/忄 + く/艹 + 数 = 惹
- - る/忄 + 宿 + ゆ/彳 = 愆
- - る/忄 + み/耳 + ん/止 = 愍
- - る/忄 + つ/土 + ゑ/訁 = 愨
- - る/忄 + ら/月 + は/辶 = 愬
- - る/忄 + よ/广 + selector 1 = 愿
- - る/忄 + 宿 + つ/土 = 慂
- - る/忄 + む/車 + を/貝 = 慙
- - る/忄 + も/門 + 数 = 慝
- - る/忄 + ゆ/彳 + よ/广 = 慫
- - る/忄 + た/⽥ + ん/止 = 慾
- - る/忄 + な/亻 + ひ/辶 = 憊
- - る/忄 + き/木 + な/亻 = 憖
- - る/忄 + つ/土 + 囗 = 憙
- - る/忄 + selector 1 + よ/广 = 懋
- - る/忄 + に/氵 + め/目 = 懣
- - の/禾 + の/禾 + る/忄 = 穩
- - さ/阝 + さ/阝 + る/忄 = 隱
- - る/忄 + 宿 + ん/止 = 懿

==== Compounds of 壱 ====
- - る/忄 + る/忄 + selector 1 = 壹
  - - れ/口 + る/忄 + selector 1 = 噎
  - - ほ/方 + る/忄 + selector 1 = 殪
  - - せ/食 + る/忄 + selector 1 = 饐
- - #1 + る/忄 + selector 1 = 弌

==== Compounds of 甘 ====
- - せ/食 + る/忄 = 甜
- - ゐ/幺 + る/忄 = 紺
- - る/忄 + き/木 = 某
  - - ゑ/訁 + る/忄 = 謀
  - - 火 + る/忄 = 煤
  - - ふ/女 + る/忄 = 媒
  - - 心 + る/忄 + き/木 = 楳
- - つ/土 + selector 4 + る/忄 = 坩
- - て/扌 + selector 4 + る/忄 = 拑
  - - ち/竹 + selector 4 + る/忄 = 箝
- - 心 + selector 4 + る/忄 = 柑
- - や/疒 + selector 4 + る/忄 = 疳
- - む/車 + selector 4 + る/忄 = 蚶
- - さ/阝 + selector 4 + る/忄 = 邯
- - せ/食 + selector 4 + る/忄 = 酣
- - か/金 + selector 4 + る/忄 = 鉗
- - 龸 + selector 4 + る/忄 = 甞

==== Compounds of 侖 ====
- - な/亻 + る/忄 = 倫
- - え/訁 + る/忄 = 論
- - む/車 + る/忄 = 輪
- - や/疒 + 龸 + る/忄 = 崘
- - や/疒 + う/宀/#3 + る/忄 = 崙
- - き/木 + 宿 + る/忄 = 棆
- - に/氵 + 宿 + る/忄 = 淪
- - い/糹/#2 + 宿 + る/忄 = 綸

==== Compounds of 婁 ====
- - い/糹/#2 + る/忄 = 縷
- - な/亻 + 宿 + る/忄 = 僂
- - や/疒 + 宿 + る/忄 = 瘻
- - ち/竹 + 宿 + る/忄 = 簍
- - む/車 + 宿 + る/忄 = 螻
- - ね/示 + 宿 + る/忄 = 褸
- - か/金 + 宿 + る/忄 = 鏤

==== Compounds of 四 ====
- - に/氵 + 数 + る/忄 = 泗
- - そ/馬 + 数 + る/忄 = 駟

==== Other compounds ====
- - き/木 + 数 + る/忄 = 楞
- - と/戸 + る/忄 = 屡
- - よ/广 + る/忄 = 庵
- - す/発 + る/忄 = 罨
- - つ/土 + る/忄 = 壊
- - へ/⺩ + る/忄 = 環
- - ひ/辶 + る/忄 = 還
- - 囗 + 宿 + る/忄 = 圜
- - つ/土 + つ/土 + る/忄 = 壞
- - う/宀/#3 + 宿 + る/忄 = 寰
- - か/金 + 龸 + る/忄 = 鐶
- - と/戸 + う/宀/#3 + る/忄 = 鬟
