= Braille pattern dots-156 =

Braille pattern

6-dot braille cells
| ⠀ | ⠁ | ⠃ | ⠉ | ⠙ | ⠑ | ⠋ | ⠛ | ⠓ | ⠊ | ⠚ | ⠈ | ⠘ |
| ⠄ | ⠅ | ⠇ | ⠍ | ⠝ | ⠕ | ⠏ | ⠟ | ⠗ | ⠎ | ⠞ | ⠌ | ⠜ |
| ⠤ | ⠥ | ⠧ | ⠭ | ⠽ | ⠵ | ⠯ | ⠿ | ⠷ | ⠮ | ⠾ | ⠬ | ⠼ |
| ⠠ | ⠡ | ⠣ | ⠩ | ⠹ | ⠱ | ⠫ | ⠻ | ⠳ | ⠪ | ⠺ | ⠨ | ⠸ |
| shift down | ⠂ | ⠆ | ⠒ | ⠲ | ⠢ | ⠖ | ⠶ | ⠦ | ⠔ | ⠴ | ⠐ | ⠰ |

The Braille pattern dots-156 ( ⠱ ) is a 6-dot braille cell with the upper left, and middle and bottom right dots raised, or an 8-dot braille cell with the upper left, and upper-middle and lower-middle right dots raised. It is represented by the Unicode code point U+2831, and in Braille ASCII with a colon: ":".

Character information
| Preview | ⠱ (braille pattern dots-156) | |
|---|---|---|
| Unicode name | BRAILLE PATTERN DOTS-156 | |
| Encodings | decimal | hex |
| Unicode | 10289 | U+2831 |
| UTF-8 | 226 160 177 | E2 A0 B1 |
| Numeric character reference | &#10289; | &#x2831; |
| Braille ASCII | 58 | 3A |

== Unified braille ==
In unified international braille, the braille pattern dots-156 is used to represent a guttural fricative or approximant, such as /h/, /ʜ/, or /ʕ/ when multiple letters correspond to these values, and is otherwise assigned as needed.

=== Table of unified braille values ===
| French Braille | Û, mathematical 5, es-, -es, "est" |
| English Braille | Wh |
| English Contraction | which |
| German Braille | sch |
| Bharati Braille | ज्ञ / જ્ઞ / জ্ঞ / ଜ୍ଞ / ඵ / ح |
| IPA Braille | /ʃ/ |
| Russian Braille | Ш |
| Slovak Braille | Š |
| Arabic Braille | ح |
| Persian Braille | ح |
| Thai Braille | ไ◌ ai |
| Luxembourgish Braille | 5 (five) |
| Romanian Braille | ș |

== Other braille ==
| Japanese Braille | sa / さ / サ |
| Korean Braille | yeo / ㅕ |
| Mainland Chinese Braille | Sh |
| Taiwanese Braille | er, -i / ㄦ,ㄭ |
| Two-Cell Chinese Braille | ju- -éng, 就 jiù |
| Nemeth Braille | not an independent sign |
| Gardner Salinas Braille | 5 |
| Algerian Braille | ـَ (fatḥah) |

== Plus dots 7 and 8 ==
Related to Braille pattern dots-156 are Braille patterns 1567, 1568, and 15678, which are used in 8-dot braille systems, such as Gardner-Salinas and Luxembourgish Braille.

Character information
| Preview | ⡱ (braille pattern dots-1567) | | ⢱ (braille pattern dots-1568) | | ⣱ (braille pattern dots-15678) | |
|---|---|---|---|---|---|---|
| Unicode name | BRAILLE PATTERN DOTS-1567 | | BRAILLE PATTERN DOTS-1568 | | BRAILLE PATTERN DOTS-15678 | |
| Encodings | decimal | hex | dec | hex | dec | hex |
| Unicode | 10353 | U+2871 | 10417 | U+28B1 | 10481 | U+28F1 |
| UTF-8 | 226 161 177 | E2 A1 B1 | 226 162 177 | E2 A2 B1 | 226 163 177 | E2 A3 B1 |
| Numeric character reference | &#10353; | &#x2871; | &#10417; | &#x28B1; | &#10481; | &#x28F1; |

| | dots 1567 | dots 1568 | dots 15678 |
|---|---|---|---|
| Gardner Salinas Braille | | | ℵ (aleph) |

== Related 8-dot kantenji patterns ==
In the Japanese kantenji braille, the standard 8-dot Braille patterns 268, 1268, 2468, and 12468 are the patterns related to Braille pattern dots-156, since the two additional dots of kantenji patterns 0156, 1567, and 01567 are placed above the base 6-dot cell, instead of below, as in standard 8-dot braille.

Character information
| Preview | ⢢ (braille pattern dots-268) | | ⢣ (braille pattern dots-1268) | | ⢪ (braille pattern dots-2468) | | ⢫ (braille pattern dots-12468) | |
|---|---|---|---|---|---|---|---|---|
| Unicode name | BRAILLE PATTERN DOTS-268 | | BRAILLE PATTERN DOTS-1268 | | BRAILLE PATTERN DOTS-2468 | | BRAILLE PATTERN DOTS-12468 | |
| Encodings | decimal | hex | dec | hex | dec | hex | dec | hex |
| Unicode | 10402 | U+28A2 | 10403 | U+28A3 | 10410 | U+28AA | 10411 | U+28AB |
| UTF-8 | 226 162 162 | E2 A2 A2 | 226 162 163 | E2 A2 A3 | 226 162 170 | E2 A2 AA | 226 162 171 | E2 A2 AB |
| Numeric character reference | &#10402; | &#x28A2; | &#10403; | &#x28A3; | &#10410; | &#x28AA; | &#10411; | &#x28AB; |

=== Kantenji using braille patterns 268, 1268, 2468, or 12468 ===
This listing includes kantenji using braille pattern dots-156 for all 6349 kanji found in JIS C 6226-1978.

- - 都

==== Variants and thematic compounds ====
- - selector 1 + さ/阝 = 卩
- - selector 2 + さ/阝 = 卵
- - selector 4 + さ/阝 = 印
- - selector 5 + さ/阝 = 巷
- - selector 6 + さ/阝 = 乍
- - さ/阝 + selector 1 = 陸

==== Compounds of 都 and ⻏ ====
- - み/耳 + さ/阝 = 耶
  - - て/扌 + み/耳 + さ/阝 = 揶
  - - 心 + み/耳 + さ/阝 = 椰
- - へ/⺩ + さ/阝 = 邦
- - め/目 + さ/阝 = 邪
- - も/門 + さ/阝 = 邸
- - ろ/十 + さ/阝 = 郁
- - や/疒 + さ/阝 = 郎
  - - 心 + や/疒 + さ/阝 = 榔
  - - へ/⺩ + や/疒 + さ/阝 = 瑯
  - - む/車 + や/疒 + さ/阝 = 螂
- - お/頁 + さ/阝 = 郡
- - ま/石 + さ/阝 = 部
  - - く/艹 + ま/石 + さ/阝 = 蔀
- - さ/阝 + ち/竹 = 郊
- - さ/阝 + こ/子 = 郭
  - - よ/广 + さ/阝 + こ/子 = 廓
  - - き/木 + さ/阝 + こ/子 = 槨
- - さ/阝 + に/氵 = 郵
- - ふ/女 + 宿 + さ/阝 = 娜
- - て/扌 + 宿 + さ/阝 = 擲
- - ね/示 + 龸 + さ/阝 = 祁
- - な/亻 + 宿 + さ/阝 = 那
- - さ/阝 + 比 + ふ/女 = 邨
- - さ/阝 + selector 4 + る/忄 = 邯
- - さ/阝 + く/艹 + selector 4 = 邱
- - さ/阝 + ぬ/力 + 囗 = 邵
- - さ/阝 + 氷/氵 + う/宀/#3 = 郛
- - さ/阝 + れ/口 + へ/⺩ = 郢
- - さ/阝 + た/⽥ + selector 1 = 郤
- - さ/阝 + 宿 + け/犬 = 鄂
- - さ/阝 + 宿 + も/門 = 鄒
- - さ/阝 + 宿 + 囗 = 鄙
- - さ/阝 + 宿 + て/扌 = 鄭
- - さ/阝 + れ/口 + れ/口 = 鄲

==== Compounds of 卩 ====
- - よ/广 + さ/阝 = 厄
  - - て/扌 + よ/广 + さ/阝 = 扼
  - - む/車 + よ/广 + さ/阝 = 軛
  - - さ/阝 + よ/广 + さ/阝 = 阨
- - さ/阝 + 囗 = 叩
  - - り/分 + さ/阝 = 命
    - - て/扌 + り/分 + さ/阝 = 掵
- - く/艹 + さ/阝 = 危
  - - ⺼ + く/艹 + さ/阝 = 脆
  - - え/訁 + く/艹 + さ/阝 = 詭
  - - み/耳 + く/艹 + さ/阝 = 跪
  - - せ/食 + く/艹 + さ/阝 = 鮠
- - す/発 + さ/阝 = 即
  - - ち/竹 + さ/阝 = 節
  - - れ/口 + す/発 + さ/阝 = 喞
- - つ/土 + さ/阝 = 却
  - - ⺼ + さ/阝 = 脚
- - ん/止 + さ/阝 = 卸
  - - ゆ/彳 + さ/阝 = 御
    - - ね/示 + ゆ/彳 + さ/阝 = 禦
  - - れ/口 + ん/止 + さ/阝 = 啣
- - て/扌 + さ/阝 = 抑
- - さ/阝 + 心 = 怨
- - け/犬 + さ/阝 = 巻
  - - 囗 + さ/阝 = 圏
    - - 囗 + 囗 + さ/阝 = 圈
  - - け/犬 + け/犬 + さ/阝 = 卷
    - - な/亻 + け/犬 + さ/阝 = 倦
    - - る/忄 + け/犬 + さ/阝 = 惓
    - - て/扌 + け/犬 + さ/阝 = 捲
    - - い/糹/#2 + け/犬 + さ/阝 = 綣
    - - む/車 + け/犬 + さ/阝 = 蜷
- - よ/广 + 宿 + さ/阝 = 卮
- - さ/阝 + 宿 + た/⽥ = 卻
- - さ/阝 + ほ/方 + selector 1 = 夘
- - き/木 + ち/竹 + さ/阝 = 櫛
- - に/氵 + 宿 + さ/阝 = 氾
- - ち/竹 + 宿 + さ/阝 = 笵
- - く/艹 + 宿 + さ/阝 = 范
- - さ/阝 + 宿 + せ/食 = 鴛

==== Compounds of 卵 ====
- - さ/阝 + う/宀/#3 = 卯
  - - 心 + さ/阝 = 柳
  - - 日 + さ/阝 + う/宀/#3 = 昴
  - - 心 + さ/阝 + う/宀/#3 = 茆
- - な/亻 + さ/阝 = 仰
- - ひ/辶 + さ/阝 = 迎
- - う/宀/#3 + selector 2 + さ/阝 = 孵
- - さ/阝 + 宿 + さ/阝 = 卿
- - 日 + 宿 + さ/阝 = 昂
- - み/耳 + 宿 + さ/阝 = 聊
- - か/金 + 宿 + さ/阝 = 鉚

==== Compounds of 巷 ====
- - に/氵 + さ/阝 = 港

==== Compounds of 乍 ====
- - 仁/亻 + さ/阝 = 作
  - - ち/竹 + 仁/亻 + さ/阝 = 筰
- - 宿 + さ/阝 = 搾
- - 日 + さ/阝 = 昨
- - え/訁 + さ/阝 = 詐
- - せ/食 + さ/阝 = 酢
- - る/忄 + selector 6 + さ/阝 = 怎
- - れ/口 + 宿 + さ/阝 = 咋
- - 心 + 宿 + さ/阝 = 柞
- - 火 + 宿 + さ/阝 = 炸
- - ね/示 + 宿 + さ/阝 = 祚
- - う/宀/#3 + 宿 + さ/阝 = 窄
- - ⺼ + 宿 + さ/阝 = 胙
- - せ/食 + 宿 + さ/阝 = 鮓

==== Compounds of 陸 and ⻖ ====
- - さ/阝 + ふ/女 = 阜
  - - つ/土 + さ/阝 + ふ/女 = 埠
- - そ/馬 + さ/阝 = 隊
- - さ/阝 + さ/阝 = 際
- - さ/阝 + よ/广 = 薩
- - さ/阝 + ん/止 = 阪
- - さ/阝 + ほ/方 = 防
- - さ/阝 + そ/馬 = 阻
- - さ/阝 + か/金 = 阿
  - - ふ/女 + さ/阝 + か/金 = 婀
  - - や/疒 + さ/阝 + か/金 = 痾
- - さ/阝 + し/巿 = 附
- - さ/阝 + い/糹/#2 = 降
- - さ/阝 + や/疒 = 限
- - さ/阝 + つ/土 = 陛
- - さ/阝 + 宿 = 院
- - さ/阝 + む/車 = 陣
- - さ/阝 + も/門 = 除
- - さ/阝 + ぬ/力 = 陥
  - - さ/阝 + さ/阝 + ぬ/力 = 陷
- - さ/阝 + ま/石 = 陪
- - さ/阝 + ゑ/訁 = 陰
  - - く/艹 + さ/阝 + ゑ/訁 = 蔭
- - さ/阝 + ひ/辶 = 陳
- - さ/阝 + す/発 = 陵
- - さ/阝 + と/戸 = 陶
- - さ/阝 + り/分 = 険
  - - さ/阝 + さ/阝 + り/分 = 險
- - さ/阝 + 数 = 陽
- - さ/阝 + く/艹 = 隅
- - さ/阝 + せ/食 = 隆
  - - や/疒 + さ/阝 + せ/食 = 嶐
  - - う/宀/#3 + さ/阝 + せ/食 = 窿
- - さ/阝 + た/⽥ = 隈
- - さ/阝 + 日 = 階
- - さ/阝 + ら/月 = 随
  - - さ/阝 + さ/阝 + ら/月 = 隨
    - - き/木 + さ/阝 + ら/月 = 橢
- - さ/阝 + れ/口 = 隔
- - さ/阝 + ⺼ = 隘
- - さ/阝 + ろ/十 = 障
- - さ/阝 + る/忄 = 隠
  - - さ/阝 + さ/阝 + る/忄 = 隱
- - さ/阝 + の/禾 = 隣
  - - さ/阝 + さ/阝 + の/禾 = 鄰
- - さ/阝 + 数 + せ/食 = 阡
- - さ/阝 + selector 1 + 宿 = 阮
- - さ/阝 + 宿 + ん/止 = 阯
- - さ/阝 + 宿 + ひ/辶 = 陀
- - さ/阝 + selector 4 + ひ/辶 = 陂
- - さ/阝 + 数 + へ/⺩ = 陋
- - さ/阝 + 数 + め/目 = 陌
- - さ/阝 + ろ/十 + ら/月 = 陏
- - さ/阝 + 宿 + な/亻 = 陜
- - さ/阝 + 龸 + な/亻 = 陝
- - さ/阝 + 日 + く/艹 = 陞
- - さ/阝 + ん/止 + そ/馬 = 陟
- - さ/阝 + へ/⺩ + し/巿 = 陦
- - さ/阝 + み/耳 + ゑ/訁 = 陬
- - さ/阝 + 宿 + に/氵 = 陲
- - さ/阝 + 宿 + ら/月 = 隋
- - さ/阝 + 日 + へ/⺩ = 隍
- - さ/阝 + を/貝 + れ/口 = 隕
- - さ/阝 + お/頁 + に/氵 = 隗
- - さ/阝 + 比 + そ/馬 = 隙
- - さ/阝 + selector 2 + そ/馬 = 隧
- - さ/阝 + 宿 + い/糹/#2 = 隰
- - さ/阝 + 宿 + そ/馬 = 隲
- - さ/阝 + ま/石 + 心 = 隴

==== Other compounds ====
- - た/⽥ + さ/阝 = 卑
  - - な/亻 + た/⽥ + さ/阝 = 俾
  - - ふ/女 + た/⽥ + さ/阝 = 婢
  - - や/疒 + た/⽥ + さ/阝 = 痺
  - - め/目 + た/⽥ + さ/阝 = 睥
  - - 心 + た/⽥ + さ/阝 = 稗
  - - ね/示 + た/⽥ + さ/阝 = 裨
  - - か/金 + た/⽥ + さ/阝 = 髀
- - れ/口 + さ/阝 = 叫
- - ふ/女 + さ/阝 = 妻
  - - き/木 + さ/阝 = 棲
  - - さ/阝 + 氷/氵 = 凄
  - - る/忄 + ふ/女 + さ/阝 = 悽
  - - に/氵 + ふ/女 + さ/阝 = 淒
  - - く/艹 + ふ/女 + さ/阝 = 萋
  - - ね/示 + ふ/女 + さ/阝 = 褄
- - ね/示 + さ/阝 = 祭
  - - う/宀/#3 + さ/阝 = 察
  - - く/艹 + ね/示 + さ/阝 = 蔡
- - 龸 + さ/阝 = 斎
  - - 龸 + 龸 + さ/阝 = 齋
  - - を/貝 + 龸 + さ/阝 = 齎
- - さ/阝 + 龸 = 斉
  - - さ/阝 + ね/示 = 剤
    - - さ/阝 + さ/阝 + ね/示 = 劑
  - - 氷/氵 + さ/阝 = 済
    - - 氷/氵 + 氷/氵 + さ/阝 = 濟
  - - さ/阝 + さ/阝 + 龸 = 齊
    - - な/亻 + さ/阝 + 龸 = 儕
    - - て/扌 + さ/阝 + 龸 = 擠
    - - 心 + さ/阝 + 龸 = 薺
    - - み/耳 + さ/阝 + 龸 = 躋
    - - ち/竹 + さ/阝 + 龸 = 霽
    - - さ/阝 + さ/阝 + 龸 = 齊
    - - さ/阝 + 龸 + 火 = 韲
  - - い/糹/#2 + さ/阝 + 龸 = 緕
- - 火 + さ/阝 = 燦
- - い/糹/#2 + さ/阝 = 糾
- - は/辶 + さ/阝 = 遷
  - - と/戸 + は/辶 + さ/阝 = 韆
- - 仁/亻 + 宿 + さ/阝 = 僊
- - の/禾 + 宿 + さ/阝 = 粲
- - い/糹/#2 + 宿 + さ/阝 = 纃
- - は/辶 + 宿 + さ/阝 = 赳
- - さ/阝 + selector 4 + 火 = 齏
