= Braille pattern dots-14 =

Braille pattern

6-dot braille cells
⠀	⠁	⠃	⠉	⠙	⠑	⠋	⠛	⠓	⠊	⠚	⠈	⠘
⠄	⠅	⠇	⠍	⠝	⠕	⠏	⠟	⠗	⠎	⠞	⠌	⠜
⠤	⠥	⠧	⠭	⠽	⠵	⠯	⠿	⠷	⠮	⠾	⠬	⠼
⠠	⠡	⠣	⠩	⠹	⠱	⠫	⠻	⠳	⠪	⠺	⠨	⠸
shift down	⠂	⠆	⠒	⠲	⠢	⠖	⠶	⠦	⠔	⠴	⠐	⠰

The Braille pattern dots-14 ( ⠉ ) is a 6-dot or 8-dot braille cell with the two top dots raised. It is represented by the Unicode code point U+2809, and in Braille ASCII with "C".

Character information
Preview	⠉ (braille pattern dots-14)	
Unicode name	BRAILLE PATTERN DOTS-14	
Encodings	decimal	hex
Unicode	10249	U+2809
UTF-8	226 160 137	E2 A0 89
Numeric character reference	&#10249;	&#x2809;
Braille ASCII	67	43

== Unified Braille ==
In unified international braille, the braille pattern dots-14 is used to represent unvoiced palatal fricatives or unvoiced alveolar affricates, such as /ts/, or /ç/, and is otherwise assigned as needed. It is also used to indicate the number 3.

=== Table of unified braille values ===
French Braille	C, "ce"
English Braille	C
English Contraction	can
German Braille	C
Bharati Braille	च / ਚ / ચ / চ / ଚ / చ / ಚ / ച / ச / ච / چ
Icelandic Braille	C
IPA Braille	/c/
Russian Braille	Ц
Slovak Braille	C
Arabic Braille	ال
Persian Braille	ﭺ
Irish Braille	C
Thai Braille	ุ u
Luxembourgish Braille	c (minuscule)

== Other braille ==
Japanese Braille	u / う / ウ
Korean Braille	n- / ㄴ
Mainland Chinese Braille	C
Taiwanese Braille	l- / ㄌ
Two-Cell Chinese Braille	zh- -òu
Nemeth Braille	not an independent sign
Algerian Braille	ت

== Plus dots 7 and 8 ==
Related to Braille pattern dots-14 are Braille patterns 147, 148, and 1478, which are used in 8-dot braille systems, such as Gardner-Salinas and Luxembourgish Braille.

Character information
Preview	⡉ (braille pattern dots-147)		⢉ (braille pattern dots-148)		⣉ (braille pattern dots-1478)	
Unicode name	BRAILLE PATTERN DOTS-147		BRAILLE PATTERN DOTS-148		BRAILLE PATTERN DOTS-1478	
Encodings	decimal	hex	dec	hex	dec	hex
Unicode	10313	U+2849	10377	U+2889	10441	U+28C9
UTF-8	226 161 137	E2 A1 89	226 162 137	E2 A2 89	226 163 137	E2 A3 89
Numeric character reference	&#10313;	&#x2849;	&#10377;	&#x2889;	&#10441;	&#x28C9;

	dots 147	dots 148	dots 1478
Gardner Salinas Braille	C (capital)	©	
Luxembourgish Braille	C (capital)		

== Related 8-dot kantenji patterns ==
In the Japanese kantenji braille, the standard 8-dot Braille patterns 25, 125, 245, and 1245 are the patterns related to Braille pattern dots-14, since the two additional dots of kantenji patterns 014, 147, and 0147 are placed above the base 6-dot cell, instead of below, as in standard 8-dot braille.

Character information
Preview	⠒ (braille pattern dots-25)		⠓ (braille pattern dots-125)		⠚ (braille pattern dots-245)		⠛ (braille pattern dots-1245)	
Unicode name	BRAILLE PATTERN DOTS-25		BRAILLE PATTERN DOTS-125		BRAILLE PATTERN DOTS-245		BRAILLE PATTERN DOTS-1245	
Encodings	decimal	hex	dec	hex	dec	hex	dec	hex
Unicode	10258	U+2812	10259	U+2813	10266	U+281A	10267	U+281B
UTF-8	226 160 146	E2 A0 92	226 160 147	E2 A0 93	226 160 154	E2 A0 9A	226 160 155	E2 A0 9B
Numeric character reference	&#10258;	&#x2812;	&#10259;	&#x2813;	&#10266;	&#x281A;	&#10267;	&#x281B;

=== Kantenji using braille patterns 25, 125, 245, or 1245 ===
This listing includes kantenji using Braille pattern dots-14 for all 6349 kanji found in JIS C 6226-1978.

- - 家

==== Variants and thematic compounds ====
- - selector 1 + う/宀/#3 = 参
- - う/宀/#3 + selector 1 + selector 1 = 宀
- - selector 2 + う/宀/#3 = 孚
- - selector 3 + う/宀/#3 = 冢
- - selector 4 + selector 4 + う/宀/#3 = 彡
- - う/宀/#3 + selector 4 = 宙
- - selector 5 + う/宀/#3 = 彭
- - selector 6 + う/宀/#3 = 宛
- - 数 + #3 = 三
- - 比 + う/宀/#3 = 上

==== Compounds of 家 ====
- - ふ/女 + う/宀/#3 = 嫁
- - の/禾 + 宿 + う/宀/#3 = 糘
- - ひ/辶 + う/宀/#3 + り/分 = 邃

==== Compounds of 宀 ====
- - う/宀/#3 + こ/子 = 字
- - う/宀/#3 + な/亻 = 宅
  - - 龸 + う/宀/#3 + な/亻 = 亳
  - - な/亻 + う/宀/#3 + な/亻 = 侘
  - - れ/口 + う/宀/#3 + な/亻 = 咤
- - う/宀/#3 + し/巿 = 守
- - う/宀/#3 + ふ/女 = 安
  - - や/疒 + う/宀/#3 + ふ/女 = 妛
  - - 日 + う/宀/#3 + ふ/女 = 晏
  - - へ/⺩ + う/宀/#3 + ふ/女 = 珱
  - - せ/食 + う/宀/#3 + ふ/女 = 鮟
- - う/宀/#3 + 宿 = 完
  - - に/氵 + う/宀/#3 + 宿 = 浣
  - - 日 + う/宀/#3 + 宿 = 皖
  - - 心 + う/宀/#3 + 宿 = 莞
- - う/宀/#3 + ね/示 = 宗
  - - 心 + う/宀/#3 + ね/示 = 棕
  - - に/氵 + う/宀/#3 + ね/示 = 淙
  - - の/禾 + う/宀/#3 + ね/示 = 粽
  - - い/糹/#2 + う/宀/#3 + ね/示 = 綜
  - - み/耳 + う/宀/#3 + ね/示 = 踪
- - う/宀/#3 + ら/月 = 官
  - - い/糹/#2 + う/宀/#3 + ら/月 = 綰
- - う/宀/#3 + よ/广 = 定
  - - て/扌 + う/宀/#3 + よ/广 = 掟
  - - に/氵 + う/宀/#3 + よ/广 = 淀
  - - ま/石 + う/宀/#3 + よ/广 = 碇
  - - い/糹/#2 + う/宀/#3 + よ/广 = 綻
  - - み/耳 + う/宀/#3 + よ/广 = 聢
  - - え/訁 + う/宀/#3 + よ/广 = 諚
- - う/宀/#3 + そ/馬 = 宜
  - - 心 + う/宀/#3 + そ/馬 = 萓
  - - え/訁 + う/宀/#3 + そ/馬 = 誼
- - う/宀/#3 + へ/⺩ = 宝
  - - selector 1 + う/宀/#3 + へ/⺩ = 寳
  - - う/宀/#3 + う/宀/#3 + へ/⺩ = 寶
  - - 火 + う/宀/#3 + へ/⺩ = 瑩
- - う/宀/#3 + は/辶 = 実
- - う/宀/#3 + 日 = 宣
  - - れ/口 + う/宀/#3 + 日 = 喧
  - - る/忄 + う/宀/#3 + 日 = 愃
  - - 日 + う/宀/#3 + 日 = 暄
  - - 心 + う/宀/#3 + 日 = 萱
  - - え/訁 + う/宀/#3 + 日 = 諠
- - う/宀/#3 + ゆ/彳 = 室
  - - 心 + う/宀/#3 + ゆ/彳 = 榁
  - - ⺼ + う/宀/#3 + ゆ/彳 = 腟
- - う/宀/#3 + み/耳 = 宮
- - う/宀/#3 + ま/石 = 宰
  - - に/氵 + う/宀/#3 + ま/石 = 滓
  - - い/糹/#2 + う/宀/#3 + ま/石 = 縡
- - う/宀/#3 + た/⽥ = 容
  - - き/木 + う/宀/#3 + た/⽥ = 榕
  - - 火 + う/宀/#3 + た/⽥ = 熔
  - - の/禾 + う/宀/#3 + た/⽥ = 穃
  - - 心 + う/宀/#3 + た/⽥ = 蓉
  - - か/金 + う/宀/#3 + た/⽥ = 鎔
- - う/宀/#3 + う/宀/#3 = 寂
- - う/宀/#3 + か/金 = 寄
- - う/宀/#3 + え/訁 = 寅
- - う/宀/#3 + や/疒 = 密
  - - 心 + う/宀/#3 + や/疒 = 樒
- - う/宀/#3 + 氷/氵 = 寒
- - う/宀/#3 + く/艹 = 寓
- - う/宀/#3 + さ/阝 = 察
- - う/宀/#3 + ろ/十 = 寮
- - う/宀/#3 + 宿 + ひ/辶 = 它
- - う/宀/#3 + 数 + え/訁 = 宍
- - う/宀/#3 + 宿 + ま/石 = 宕
- - う/宀/#3 + ろ/十 + ら/月 = 宥
- - う/宀/#3 + selector 4 + す/発 = 宦
- - う/宀/#3 + selector 4 + ろ/十 = 宸
- - う/宀/#3 + ぬ/力 + 宿 = 寃
- - う/宀/#3 + selector 1 + 宿 = 寇
- - う/宀/#3 + selector 4 + い/糹/#2 = 寉
- - う/宀/#3 + き/木 + selector 4 = 寐
- - う/宀/#3 + 日 + よ/广 = 寔
- - う/宀/#3 + 宿 + く/艹 = 寞
- - う/宀/#3 + ら/月 + れ/口 = 寤
- - う/宀/#3 + 宿 + き/木 = 寨
- - う/宀/#3 + 宿 + selector 1 = 寫
- - う/宀/#3 + 宿 + る/忄 = 寰
- - う/宀/#3 + を/貝 = 賓
  - - ふ/女 + う/宀/#3 + を/貝 = 嬪
  - - て/扌 + う/宀/#3 + を/貝 = 擯
  - - 心 + う/宀/#3 + を/貝 = 檳
  - - ほ/方 + う/宀/#3 + を/貝 = 殯
  - - い/糹/#2 + う/宀/#3 + を/貝 = 繽
- - う/宀/#3 + ぬ/力 = 寡
- - う/宀/#3 + り/分 = 穴
  - - う/宀/#3 + 宿 + せ/食 = 鴪
  - - い/糹/#2 + う/宀/#3 + り/分 = 穽
  - - こ/子 + う/宀/#3 + り/分 = 窖
  - - か/金 + う/宀/#3 + り/分 = 窩
  - - 火 + う/宀/#3 + り/分 = 竃
  - - 氷/氵 + う/宀/#3 + り/分 = 竅
  - - つ/土 + う/宀/#3 + り/分 = 竇
  - - う/宀/#3 + お/頁 = 究
  - - う/宀/#3 + き/木 = 空
    - - な/亻 + う/宀/#3 + き/木 = 倥
    - - れ/口 + う/宀/#3 + き/木 = 啌
    - - き/木 + う/宀/#3 + き/木 = 椌
    - - ち/竹 + う/宀/#3 + き/木 = 箜
    - - ⺼ + う/宀/#3 + き/木 = 腔
  - - う/宀/#3 + け/犬 = 突
  - - う/宀/#3 + れ/口 = 窃
  - - う/宀/#3 + に/氵 = 窪
  - - う/宀/#3 + 火 = 窯
  - - う/宀/#3 + む/車 = 蜜
    - - 心 + う/宀/#3 + む/車 = 櫁
  - - う/宀/#3 + う/宀/#3 + れ/口 = 竊
  - - う/宀/#3 + ゆ/彳 + selector 1 = 穹
  - - う/宀/#3 + 宿 + さ/阝 = 窄
  - - う/宀/#3 + ゐ/幺 + selector 1 = 窈
  - - う/宀/#3 + 数 + 宿 = 窕
  - - う/宀/#3 + お/頁 + selector 1 = 窘
  - - う/宀/#3 + と/戸 + へ/⺩ = 窟
  - - う/宀/#3 + 宿 + 火 = 窰
  - - う/宀/#3 + 宿 + 数 = 窶
  - - う/宀/#3 + さ/阝 + せ/食 = 窿
  - - う/宀/#3 + け/犬 + selector 5 = 竄
- - て/扌 + 龸 + う/宀/#3 = 搴
- - う/宀/#3 + 宿 + ゑ/訁 = 謇
- - う/宀/#3 + み/耳 + selector 2 = 蹇
- - う/宀/#3 + う/宀/#3 + は/辶 = 實
- - う/宀/#3 + 宿 + そ/馬 = 騫
- - う/宀/#3 + そ/馬 + selector 1 = 牢

==== Compounds of 参 ====
- - selector 1 + selector 1 + う/宀/#3 = 參
  - - に/氵 + selector 1 + う/宀/#3 = 滲
  - - く/艹 + selector 1 + う/宀/#3 = 蔘
  - - そ/馬 + selector 1 + う/宀/#3 = 驂
  - - せ/食 + う/宀/#3 + う/宀/#3 = 鰺
  - - せ/食 + う/宀/#3 + う/宀/#3 = 鰺
- - な/亻 + う/宀/#3 = 修
  - - く/艹 + な/亻 + う/宀/#3 = 蓚
- - る/忄 + う/宀/#3 = 惨
  - - る/忄 + る/忄 + う/宀/#3 = 慘
- - せ/食 + selector 1 + う/宀/#3 = 鯵

==== Compounds of 孚 ====
- - 氷/氵 + う/宀/#3 = 浮
- - ふ/女 + 氷/氵 + う/宀/#3 = 艀
- - む/車 + 氷/氵 + う/宀/#3 = 蜉
- - さ/阝 + 氷/氵 + う/宀/#3 = 郛
- - な/亻 + 宿 + う/宀/#3 = 俘
- - う/宀/#3 + selector 2 + さ/阝 = 孵
- - き/木 + selector 2 + う/宀/#3 = 桴
- - ほ/方 + 龸 + う/宀/#3 = 殍

==== Compounds of 冢 ====
- - つ/土 + う/宀/#3 = 塚

==== Compounds of 宙 ====
- - う/宀/#3 + の/禾 = 審
  - - に/氵 + う/宀/#3 + の/禾 = 瀋

==== Compounds of 彭 ====
- - ら/月 + う/宀/#3 = 膨
- - に/氵 + 宿 + う/宀/#3 = 澎
- - ね/示 + う/宀/#3 = 形
- - ね/示 + 宿 + う/宀/#3 = 衫
- - よ/广 + う/宀/#3 = 彦
  - - え/訁 + う/宀/#3 = 諺
  - - お/頁 + う/宀/#3 = 顔
    - - お/頁 + お/頁 + う/宀/#3 = 顏
  - - な/亻 + よ/广 + う/宀/#3 = 偐
- - ち/竹 + う/宀/#3 = 彩
- - 囗 + う/宀/#3 = 彫
  - - ち/竹 + 囗 + う/宀/#3 = 簓
- - ま/石 + う/宀/#3 = 彰
- - 日 + う/宀/#3 = 影
- - 心 + う/宀/#3 = 杉
  - - き/木 + 心 + う/宀/#3 = 彬
- - ゑ/訁 + う/宀/#3 = 診
- - へ/⺩ + う/宀/#3 = 珍
- - ほ/方 + 宿 + う/宀/#3 = 殄
- - た/⽥ + 宿 + う/宀/#3 = 畛
- - や/疒 + 宿 + う/宀/#3 = 疹
- - ね/示 + う/宀/#3 + う/宀/#3 = 袗
- - は/辶 + 宿 + う/宀/#3 = 趁
- - む/車 + 龸 + う/宀/#3 = 軫
- - せ/食 + 宿 + う/宀/#3 = 餮
- - う/宀/#3 + 宿 + う/宀/#3 = 寥
- - て/扌 + う/宀/#3 + う/宀/#3 = 摎
- - て/扌 + う/宀/#3 + う/宀/#3 = 摎
- - け/犬 + 宿 + う/宀/#3 = 尨
  - - よ/广 + 宿 + う/宀/#3 = 厖
- - と/戸 + う/宀/#3 = 髪
  - - と/戸 + う/宀/#3 + ま/石 = 鬘
  - - と/戸 + と/戸 + う/宀/#3 = 髮
- - せ/食 + と/戸 + う/宀/#3 = 髦
- - も/門 + と/戸 + う/宀/#3 = 髱
- - と/戸 + う/宀/#3 + る/忄 = 鬟
- - う/宀/#3 + す/発 + selector 3 = 彪
- - う/宀/#3 + す/発 = 須
  - - と/戸 + う/宀/#3 + す/発 = 鬚

==== Compounds of 宛 ====
- - selector 6 + selector 6 + う/宀/#3 = 彑
- - く/艹 + 宿 + う/宀/#3 = 苑
- - ⺼ + う/宀/#3 = 腕
- - ふ/女 + 宿 + う/宀/#3 = 婉
- - ま/石 + 宿 + う/宀/#3 = 碗
- - む/車 + 宿 + う/宀/#3 = 蜿
- - う/宀/#3 + selector 5 + と/戸 = 豌
- - か/金 + 宿 + う/宀/#3 = 鋺
- - き/木 + 宿 + う/宀/#3 = 椀

==== Compounds of 三 ====
- - れ/口 + う/宀/#3 = 品
  - - い/糹/#2 + う/宀/#3 = 繰
  - - す/発 + う/宀/#3 = 臨
  - - み/耳 + う/宀/#3 = 躁
  - - て/扌 + う/宀/#3 = 操
  - - 火 + う/宀/#3 = 燥
  - - や/疒 + れ/口 + う/宀/#3 = 嵒
  - - る/忄 + れ/口 + う/宀/#3 = 懆
  - - に/氵 + れ/口 + う/宀/#3 = 澡
  - - え/訁 + れ/口 + う/宀/#3 = 譟
  - - れ/口 + 宿 + う/宀/#3 = 噪
  - - う/宀/#3 + 比 + え/訁 = 髞
- - き/木 + う/宀/#3 = 森
- - む/車 + う/宀/#3 = 轟
- - そ/馬 + う/宀/#3 + そ/馬 = 驫

==== Compounds of 上 ====
- - や/疒 + う/宀/#3 = 峠
- - つ/土 + 比 + う/宀/#3 = 垰
- - ね/示 + う/宀/#3 + 龸 = 裃
- - と/戸 + う/宀/#3 + 龸 = 鞐
- - に/氵 + う/宀/#3 = 淑
- - う/宀/#3 + め/目 = 督

==== Other compounds ====
- - せ/食 + う/宀/#3 = 烏
  - - れ/口 + せ/食 + う/宀/#3 = 嗚
  - - つ/土 + せ/食 + う/宀/#3 = 塢
- - そ/馬 + う/宀/#3 = 兎
  - - そ/馬 + そ/馬 + う/宀/#3 = 兔
  - - 心 + そ/馬 + う/宀/#3 = 莵
- - さ/阝 + う/宀/#3 = 卯
  - - 日 + さ/阝 + う/宀/#3 = 昴
  - - 心 + さ/阝 + う/宀/#3 = 茆
- - く/艹 + う/宀/#3 = 急
- - ひ/辶 + う/宀/#3 = 戚
  - - 心 + ひ/辶 + う/宀/#3 = 槭
- - け/犬 + う/宀/#3 = 狙
- - め/目 + う/宀/#3 = 眺
- - の/禾 + う/宀/#3 = 糎
- - こ/子 + う/宀/#3 = 虹
- - を/貝 + う/宀/#3 = 賽
- - う/宀/#3 + 囗 = 亮
  - - れ/口 + う/宀/#3 + 囗 = 喨
- - う/宀/#3 + ゑ/訁 = 叔
  - - 心 + う/宀/#3 + ゑ/訁 = 椒
  - - な/亻 + う/宀/#3 + ゑ/訁 = 俶
- - う/宀/#3 + つ/土 = 塞
- - う/宀/#3 + い/糹/#2 = 彙
- - う/宀/#3 + 心 = 憲
- - う/宀/#3 + て/扌 = 挙
  - - う/宀/#3 + う/宀/#3 + て/扌 = 擧
    - - ね/示 + う/宀/#3 + て/扌 = 襷
  - - selector 1 + う/宀/#3 + て/扌 = 舉
- - 数 + う/宀/#3 + 龸 = 卍
- - か/金 + う/宀/#3 + ろ/十 = 瓧
- - か/金 + う/宀/#3 + 日 = 瓰
- - う/宀/#3 + selector 6 + か/金 = 甍
- - と/戸 + う/宀/#3 + ぬ/力 = 剏
- - れ/口 + う/宀/#3 + め/目 = 嚔
- - ふ/女 + う/宀/#3 + ぬ/力 = 娚
- - や/疒 + う/宀/#3 + り/分 = 岔
- - や/疒 + う/宀/#3 + 日 = 岶
- - や/疒 + う/宀/#3 + む/車 = 峻
- - や/疒 + う/宀/#3 + か/金 = 崋
- - や/疒 + う/宀/#3 + 比 = 崑
- - や/疒 + う/宀/#3 + い/糹/#2 = 崔
- - や/疒 + う/宀/#3 + つ/土 = 崖
- - や/疒 + う/宀/#3 + る/忄 = 崙
- - や/疒 + う/宀/#3 + す/発 = 崚
- - や/疒 + う/宀/#3 + く/艹 = 嵎
- - や/疒 + う/宀/#3 + け/犬 = 嵜
- - や/疒 + う/宀/#3 + そ/馬 = 嵳
- - や/疒 + う/宀/#3 + ま/石 = 嶂
- - や/疒 + う/宀/#3 + せ/食 = 嶌
- - や/疒 + う/宀/#3 + お/頁 = 巍
- - や/疒 + う/宀/#3 + え/訁 = 巒
- - て/扌 + う/宀/#3 + ぬ/力 = 抛
- - て/扌 + う/宀/#3 + な/亻 = 抬
- - き/木 + う/宀/#3 + ぬ/力 = 朸
- - 心 + う/宀/#3 + ま/石 = 柘
- - き/木 + う/宀/#3 + か/金 = 桿
- - き/木 + う/宀/#3 + 日 = 檐
- - に/氵 + う/宀/#3 + む/車 = 淕
- - に/氵 + う/宀/#3 + ぬ/力 = 渊
- - に/氵 + う/宀/#3 + ん/止 = 澀
- - の/禾 + う/宀/#3 + 比 = 粃
- - 心 + う/宀/#3 + き/木 = 菻
- - 心 + う/宀/#3 + も/門 = 蒟
- - 心 + う/宀/#3 + て/扌 = 蓴
- - 心 + う/宀/#3 + の/禾 = 藜
- - 心 + う/宀/#3 + い/糹/#2 = 藺
- - に/氵 + う/宀/#3 + そ/馬 = 覊
- - け/犬 + う/宀/#3 + り/分 = 豬
- - む/車 + う/宀/#3 + ち/竹 = 輌
- - む/車 + う/宀/#3 + の/禾 = 轎
- - ひ/辶 + う/宀/#3 + む/車 = 逡
- - か/金 + う/宀/#3 + け/犬 = 鐡
- - も/門 + う/宀/#3 + へ/⺩ = 閠
- - 心 + う/宀/#3 + 火 = 韮
- - 氷/氵 + う/宀/#3 + そ/馬 = 馮
- - も/門 + う/宀/#3 + し/巿 = 鬧
- - せ/食 + う/宀/#3 + ま/石 = 鮖
- - せ/食 + う/宀/#3 + の/禾 = 鰕
- - せ/食 + う/宀/#3 + ら/月 = 鰡
- - せ/食 + う/宀/#3 + ⺼ = 鰮
- - 龸 + う/宀/#3 + せ/食 = 鳧
- - ゆ/彳 + う/宀/#3 + せ/食 = 鵆
- - 囗 + う/宀/#3 + せ/食 = 鵤
- - ひ/辶 + う/宀/#3 + せ/食 = 鶇
- - よ/广 + う/宀/#3 + せ/食 = 鶩
- - ろ/十 + う/宀/#3 + せ/食 = 鷯
- - な/亻 + れ/口 + う/宀/#3 = 侃
- - ち/竹 + う/宀/#3 + い/糹/#2 = 籬
- - う/宀/#3 + selector 4 + ゑ/訁 = 攴
- - 心 + き/木 + う/宀/#3 = 杜
- - め/目 + 宿 + う/宀/#3 = 眄
- - selector 4 + む/車 + う/宀/#3 = 軣
- - う/宀/#3 + め/目 + う/宀/#3 = 鼎
