= Braille pattern dots-1456 =

Braille pattern

6-dot braille cells
| ⠀ | ⠁ | ⠃ | ⠉ | ⠙ | ⠑ | ⠋ | ⠛ | ⠓ | ⠊ | ⠚ | ⠈ | ⠘ |
| ⠄ | ⠅ | ⠇ | ⠍ | ⠝ | ⠕ | ⠏ | ⠟ | ⠗ | ⠎ | ⠞ | ⠌ | ⠜ |
| ⠤ | ⠥ | ⠧ | ⠭ | ⠽ | ⠵ | ⠯ | ⠿ | ⠷ | ⠮ | ⠾ | ⠬ | ⠼ |
| ⠠ | ⠡ | ⠣ | ⠩ | ⠹ | ⠱ | ⠫ | ⠻ | ⠳ | ⠪ | ⠺ | ⠨ | ⠸ |
| shift down | ⠂ | ⠆ | ⠒ | ⠲ | ⠢ | ⠖ | ⠶ | ⠦ | ⠔ | ⠴ | ⠐ | ⠰ |

The Braille pattern dots-1456 ( ⠹ ) is a 6-dot braille cell with both top, the middle right, and bottom right dots raised, or an 8-dot braille cell with both top, the upper-middle right, and lower-middle right dots raised. It is represented by the Unicode code point U+2839, and in Braille ASCII with a question mark: ?.

Character information
| Preview | ⠹ (braille pattern dots-1456) | |
|---|---|---|
| Unicode name | BRAILLE PATTERN DOTS-1456 | |
| Encodings | decimal | hex |
| Unicode | 10297 | U+2839 |
| UTF-8 | 226 160 185 | E2 A0 B9 |
| Numeric character reference | &#10297; | &#x2839; |
| Braille ASCII | 63 | 3F |

== Unified Braille ==
In unified international braille, the braille pattern dots-1456 is used to represent a voiceless dental fricative, i.e. /θ/, and is otherwise assigned as needed.

=== Table of unified braille values ===
| French Braille | Ô, mathematical 4, dr, -ant, "dans" |
| English Braille | Th |
| English Contraction | this |
| German Braille | Ch |
| Bharati Braille | थ / ਥ / થ / থ / ଥ / థ / ಥ / ഥ / ථ / تھ |
| Icelandic Braille | Ó |
| IPA Braille | bridge diacritic |
| Russian Braille | Ї |
| Arabic Braille | ث |
| Persian Braille | ث |
| Irish Braille | th |
| Thai Braille | พ ph |
| Luxembourgish Braille | 4 (four) |

== Other braille ==
| Japanese Braille | su / す / ス |
| Mainland Chinese Braille | yong, -iong |
| Taiwanese Braille | yin, -in / ㄧㄣ |
| Two-Cell Chinese Braille | zu- -áng |
| Nemeth Braille | open fraction |
| Gardner Salinas Braille | 4 |
| Algerian Braille | ـُ (ḍammah) |

== Plus dots 7 and 8 ==
Related to Braille pattern dots-1456 are Braille patterns 14567, 14568, and 145678, which are used in 8-dot braille systems, such as Gardner-Salinas and Luxembourgish Braille.

Character information
| Preview | ⡹ (braille pattern dots-14567) | | ⢹ (braille pattern dots-14568) | | ⣹ (braille pattern dots-145678) | |
|---|---|---|---|---|---|---|
| Unicode name | BRAILLE PATTERN DOTS-14567 | | BRAILLE PATTERN DOTS-14568 | | BRAILLE PATTERN DOTS-145678 | |
| Encodings | decimal | hex | dec | hex | dec | hex |
| Unicode | 10361 | U+2879 | 10425 | U+28B9 | 10489 | U+28F9 |
| UTF-8 | 226 161 185 | E2 A1 B9 | 226 162 185 | E2 A2 B9 | 226 163 185 | E2 A3 B9 |
| Numeric character reference | &#10361; | &#x2879; | &#10425; | &#x28B9; | &#10489; | &#x28F9; |

| | dots 14567 | dots 14568 | dots 145678 |
|---|---|---|---|
| Gardner Salinas Braille | | | |

== Related 8-dot kantenji patterns ==
In the Japanese kantenji braille, the standard 8-dot Braille patterns 2568, 12568, 24568, and 124568 are the patterns related to Braille pattern dots-1456, since the two additional dots of kantenji patterns 01456, 14567, and 014567 are placed above the base 6-dot cell, instead of below, as in standard 8-dot braille.

Character information
| Preview | ⢲ (braille pattern dots-2568) | | ⢳ (braille pattern dots-12568) | | ⢺ (braille pattern dots-24568) | | ⢻ (braille pattern dots-124568) | |
|---|---|---|---|---|---|---|---|---|
| Unicode name | BRAILLE PATTERN DOTS-2568 | | BRAILLE PATTERN DOTS-12568 | | BRAILLE PATTERN DOTS-24568 | | BRAILLE PATTERN DOTS-124568 | |
| Encodings | decimal | hex | dec | hex | dec | hex | dec | hex |
| Unicode | 10418 | U+28B2 | 10419 | U+28B3 | 10426 | U+28BA | 10427 | U+28BB |
| UTF-8 | 226 162 178 | E2 A2 B2 | 226 162 179 | E2 A2 B3 | 226 162 186 | E2 A2 BA | 226 162 187 | E2 A2 BB |
| Numeric character reference | &#10418; | &#x28B2; | &#10419; | &#x28B3; | &#10426; | &#x28BA; | &#10427; | &#x28BB; |

=== Kantenji using braille patterns 2568, 12568, 24568, or 124568 ===
This listing includes kantenji using Braille pattern dots-1456 for all 6349 kanji found in JIS C 6226-1978.

- - 発

==== Variants and thematic compounds ====
- - selector 1 + す/発 = 巨
- - selector 4 + す/発 = 臣
- - selector 6 + selector 6 + す/発 = 乕
- - す/発 + selector 1 = 冬
  - - す/発 + selector 1 + selector 1 = 夊
- - す/発 + selector 2 = 罪
  - - す/発 + selector 2 + selector 2 = 网
- - す/発 + selector 3 = 虎
  - - す/発 + selector 3 + selector 3 = 虍
- - す/発 + selector 4 = 久
  - - す/発 + selector 4 + selector 4 = 夂
- - 数 + す/発 = 癸

==== Compounds of 発 and 癶 ====
- - よ/广 + す/発 = 廃
  - - よ/广 + よ/广 + す/発 = 廢
- - す/発 + と/戸 = 登
  - - や/疒 + す/発 + と/戸 = 嶝
  - - 心 + す/発 + と/戸 = 橙
  - - ま/石 + す/発 + と/戸 = 磴
  - - か/金 + す/発 + と/戸 = 鐙
- - す/発 + す/発 = 發
- - て/扌 + 宿 + す/発 = 撥
- - に/氵 + 宿 + す/発 = 溌
- - や/疒 + 宿 + す/発 = 癈
- - す/発 + 宿 + selector 1 = 癶
- - せ/食 + 宿 + す/発 = 醗

==== Compounds of 巨 ====
- - や/疒 + す/発 = 矩
- - み/耳 + す/発 = 距
- - す/発 + て/扌 = 拒
- - す/発 + に/氵 = 渠
- - 火 + selector 1 + す/発 = 炬
- - の/禾 + selector 1 + す/発 = 秬
- - く/艹 + selector 1 + す/発 = 苣
- - か/金 + selector 1 + す/発 = 鉅

==== Compounds of 臣 ====
- - つ/土 + す/発 = 堅
  - - る/忄 + つ/土 + す/発 = 慳
  - - 心 + つ/土 + す/発 = 樫
  - - か/金 + つ/土 + す/発 = 鏗
  - - せ/食 + つ/土 + す/発 = 鰹
- - ゐ/幺 + す/発 = 緊
- - を/貝 + す/発 = 賢
- - ふ/女 + す/発 = 姫
- - ら/月 + す/発 = 臓
  - - ら/月 + ら/月 + す/発 = 臟
- - く/艹 + す/発 = 蔵
  - - く/艹 + く/艹 + す/発 = 藏
- - め/目 + す/発 = 覧
  - - め/目 + め/目 + す/発 = 覽
    - - て/扌 + め/目 + す/発 = 攬
    - - 心 + め/目 + す/発 = 欖
    - - い/糹/#2 + め/目 + す/発 = 纜
- - す/発 + ⺼ = 監
  - - な/亻 + す/発 + ⺼ = 儖
  - - き/木 + す/発 + ⺼ = 檻
  - - ち/竹 + す/発 + ⺼ = 籃
  - - い/糹/#2 + す/発 + ⺼ = 繿
  - - ね/示 + す/発 + ⺼ = 襤
- - す/発 + な/亻 = 臥
- - す/発 + う/宀/#3 = 臨
- - う/宀/#3 + selector 4 + す/発 = 宦
- - す/発 + ま/石 + selector 1 = 竪
- - へ/⺩ + 宿 + す/発 = 臧
- - と/戸 + 宿 + す/発 = 豎
- - を/貝 + 宿 + す/発 = 贓
- - お/頁 + 宿 + す/発 = 頤

==== Compounds of 冬 ====
- - い/糹/#2 + す/発 = 終
- - 心 + す/発 + selector 1 = 柊
- - や/疒 + す/発 + selector 1 = 疼
- - く/艹 + す/発 + selector 1 = 苳
- - む/車 + す/発 + selector 1 = 螽
- - せ/食 + す/発 + selector 1 = 鮗
- - と/戸 + す/発 + selector 1 = 鼕

==== Compounds of 罪, 网, and ⺲ ====
- - そ/馬 + す/発 = 罵
- - す/発 + し/巿 = 欝
  - - す/発 + す/発 + し/巿 = 鬱
- - す/発 + ん/止 = 罠
- - す/発 + る/忄 = 罨
- - す/発 + め/目 = 置
- - す/発 + ね/示 = 罰
- - す/発 + 日 = 署
  - - 心 + す/発 + 日 = 薯
- - す/発 + ら/月 = 罷
  - - て/扌 + す/発 + ら/月 = 擺
  - - す/発 + ら/月 + 火 = 羆
- - す/発 + り/分 = 罹
- - す/発 + い/糹/#2 = 羅
  - - 心 + す/発 + い/糹/#2 = 蘿
  - - ひ/辶 + す/発 + い/糹/#2 = 邏
  - - か/金 + す/発 + い/糹/#2 = 鑼
- - す/発 + ろ/十 = 羈
- - す/発 + ひ/辶 = 蔑
  - - ね/示 + す/発 + ひ/辶 = 襪
  - - と/戸 + す/発 + ひ/辶 = 韈
- - す/発 + え/訁 = 詈
  - - す/発 + え/訁 + し/巿 = 罸
- - す/発 + を/貝 = 買
- - す/発 + つ/土 + か/金 = 睾
- - す/発 + selector 4 + ふ/女 = 罘
- - す/発 + れ/口 + ろ/十 = 罟
- - す/発 + き/木 + き/木 = 罧
- - す/発 + 日 + と/戸 = 罩
- - す/発 + 宿 + つ/土 = 罫
- - す/発 + い/糹/#2 + ら/月 = 羂
- - す/発 + く/艹 + し/巿 = 羃
- - す/発 + け/犬 + か/金 = 羇

==== Compounds of 虎, 虍, and 乕 ====
- - す/発 + 心 = 慮
  - - に/氵 + す/発 + 心 = 濾
  - - か/金 + す/発 + 心 = 鑢
- - す/発 + 囗 = 戯
  - - す/発 + す/発 + 囗 = 戲
- - す/発 + た/⽥ = 膚
- - す/発 + か/金 = 虐
  - - や/疒 + す/発 + か/金 = 瘧
  - - え/訁 + す/発 + か/金 = 謔
- - す/発 + 火 = 虚
  - - つ/土 + す/発 + 火 = 墟
  - - ん/止 + す/発 + 火 = 歔
- - す/発 + ぬ/力 = 虜
- - す/発 + こ/子 = 虞
- - れ/口 + す/発 = 号
  - - れ/口 + れ/口 + す/発 = 號
    - - せ/食 + れ/口 + す/発 = 饕
- - う/宀/#3 + す/発 + selector 3 = 彪
- - へ/⺩ + す/発 + selector 3 = 琥
- - ね/示 + す/発 + selector 3 = 褫
- - せ/食 + す/発 + selector 3 = 鯱
- - す/発 + す/発 + そ/馬 = 據
- - ひ/辶 + す/発 + そ/馬 = 遽
- - せ/食 + す/発 + そ/馬 = 醵
- - す/発 + す/発 + そ/馬 = 據
- - す/発 + 宿 + た/⽥ = 盧
- - ん/止 + 宿 + す/発 = 罅
- - す/発 + 龸 + selector 3 = 虔
- - す/発 + 宿 + も/門 = 虧
- - か/金 + 宿 + す/発 = 鑪
- - ひ/辶 + す/発 = 逓
  - - ひ/辶 + ひ/辶 + す/発 = 遞

==== Compounds of 久 and 夂 ====
- - え/訁 + す/発 = 変
  - - え/訁 + え/訁 + す/発 = 變
- - お/頁 + す/発 = 夏
  - - よ/广 + お/頁 + す/発 = 厦
  - - れ/口 + お/頁 + す/発 = 嗄
  - - selector 1 + お/頁 + す/発 = 夐
    - - へ/⺩ + お/頁 + す/発 = 瓊
- - と/戸 + す/発 = 履
- - ゆ/彳 + す/発 = 復
  - - 氷/氵 + す/発 = 覆
- - ⺼ + す/発 = 腹
- - ね/示 + す/発 = 複
- - む/車 + す/発 = 輹
- - 火 + す/発 = 灸
- - の/禾 + す/発 = 稜
  - - 心 + の/禾 + す/発 = 薐
- - さ/阝 + す/発 = 陵
- - す/発 + れ/口 = 各
  - - け/犬 + す/発 = 狢
  - - せ/食 + す/発 = 酪
  - - も/門 + す/発 = 閣
  - - れ/口 + す/発 + れ/口 = 咯
  - - る/忄 + す/発 + れ/口 = 恪
  - - て/扌 + す/発 + れ/口 = 挌
  - - 火 + す/発 + れ/口 = 烙
  - - へ/⺩ + す/発 + れ/口 = 珞
  - - く/艹 + す/発 + れ/口 = 茖
  - - け/犬 + す/発 + れ/口 = 貉
  - - を/貝 + す/発 + れ/口 = 賂
  - - む/車 + す/発 + れ/口 = 輅
  - - そ/馬 + す/発 + れ/口 = 駱
  - - か/金 + す/発 + れ/口 = 骼
- - へ/⺩ + す/発 = 麦
  - - へ/⺩ + へ/⺩ + す/発 = 麥
    - - す/発 + 宿 + け/犬 = 麩
    - - す/発 + 宿 + ん/止 = 麪
    - - す/発 + も/門 + selector 2 = 麭
  - - も/門 + へ/⺩ + す/発 = 麹
  - - す/発 + selector 3 + け/犬 = 麸
  - - す/発 + め/目 + selector 4 = 麺
- - す/発 + 龸 = 処
  - - す/発 + そ/馬 = 拠
  - - す/発 + す/発 + 龸 = 處
  - - す/発 + す/発 + 龸 = 處
- - す/発 + き/木 = 条
  - - す/発 + す/発 + き/木 = 條
    - - に/氵 + す/発 + き/木 = 滌
    - - 心 + す/発 + き/木 = 篠
- - た/⽥ + す/発 = 畝
- - き/木 + す/発 + selector 4 = 柩
- - へ/⺩ + す/発 + selector 4 = 玖
- - や/疒 + す/発 + selector 4 = 疚
- - か/金 + す/発 + selector 4 = 鑁
- - 氷/氵 + 宿 + す/発 = 凌
- - れ/口 + 宿 + す/発 = 咎
- - や/疒 + う/宀/#3 + す/発 = 崚
- - よ/广 + 宿 + す/発 = 廈
- - る/忄 + 宿 + す/発 = 愎
- - て/扌 + も/門 + す/発 = 擱
- - 心 + 宿 + す/発 = 稷
- - す/発 + の/禾 + selector 1 = 粂
- - い/糹/#2 + 宿 + す/発 = 綾
- - 心 + 龸 + す/発 = 蔆
- - む/車 + 宿 + す/発 = 蝮
- - す/発 + の/禾 + 日 = 馥
- - せ/食 + 龸 + す/発 = 鰒

==== Compounds of 癸 ====
- - 心 + す/発 = 葵
- - て/扌 + 数 + す/発 = 揆

==== Other compounds ====
- - て/扌 + す/発 = 探
- - に/氵 + す/発 = 深
- - 日 + す/発 = 旬
  - - ほ/方 + す/発 = 殉
  - - ゆ/彳 + 日 + す/発 = 徇
  - - る/忄 + 日 + す/発 = 恂
  - - に/氵 + 日 + す/発 = 洵
  - - い/糹/#2 + 日 + す/発 = 絢
  - - 心 + 日 + す/発 = 荀
  - - え/訁 + 日 + す/発 = 詢
- - き/木 + す/発 = 枢
  - - き/木 + き/木 + す/発 = 樞
- - は/辶 + す/発 = 趨
- - う/宀/#3 + す/発 = 須
  - - と/戸 + う/宀/#3 + す/発 = 鬚
- - す/発 + さ/阝 = 即
  - - れ/口 + す/発 + さ/阝 = 喞
- - け/犬 + 宿 + す/発 = 彗
- - た/⽥ + 宿 + す/発 = 畆
- - す/発 + selector 4 + か/金 = 罕
