= Braille pattern dots-12 =

Braille pattern

6-dot braille cells
⠀	⠁	⠃	⠉	⠙	⠑	⠋	⠛	⠓	⠊	⠚	⠈	⠘
⠄	⠅	⠇	⠍	⠝	⠕	⠏	⠟	⠗	⠎	⠞	⠌	⠜
⠤	⠥	⠧	⠭	⠽	⠵	⠯	⠿	⠷	⠮	⠾	⠬	⠼
⠠	⠡	⠣	⠩	⠹	⠱	⠫	⠻	⠳	⠪	⠺	⠨	⠸
shift down	⠂	⠆	⠒	⠲	⠢	⠖	⠶	⠦	⠔	⠴	⠐	⠰

The Braille pattern dots-12 ( ⠃ ) is a 6-dot or 8-dot braille cell with the top two left dots raised. It is represented by the Unicode code point U+2803, and in Braille ASCII with "B".

Character information
Preview	⠃ (braille pattern dots-12)	
Unicode name	BRAILLE PATTERN DOTS-12	
Encodings	decimal	hex
Unicode	10243	U+2803
UTF-8	226 160 131	E2 A0 83
Numeric character reference	&#10243;	&#x2803;
Braille ASCII	66	42

== Unified Braille ==
In unified international braille, the braille pattern dots-12 is used to represent a voiced bilabial plosive, i.e. /b/, and is otherwise assigned as needed. It is also used for the number 2.

=== Table of unified braille values ===
Italian Braille	B
French Braille	B, "bien"
English Braille	B
English Contraction	but
German Braille	B
Bharati Braille	ब / ਬ / બ / ব / ବ / బ / ಬ / ബ / බ / ب
Icelandic Braille	B
IPA Braille	/b/
Russian Braille	Б
Slovak Braille	B
Arabic Braille	ب
Persian Braille	ب
Irish Braille	B
Thai Braille	ั
Luxembourgish Braille	b (minuscule)

== Other braille ==
Japanese Braille	i / い / イ
Korean Braille	-b / -ㅂ
Mainland Chinese Braille	b
Taiwanese Braille	ch-, ㄔ
Two-Cell Chinese Braille	h- -ì/-ù/-ǜ/tone 4
Nemeth Braille	not an independent symbol
Gardner Salinas Braille	"b"
Algerian Braille	ب

== Plus dots 7 and 8 ==
Related to Braille pattern dots-12 are Braille patterns 127, 128, and 1278, which are used in 8-dot braille systems, such as Gardner-Salinas and Luxembourgish Braille.

Character information
Preview	⡃ (braille pattern dots-127)		⢃ (braille pattern dots-128)		⣃ (braille pattern dots-1278)	
Unicode name	BRAILLE PATTERN DOTS-127		BRAILLE PATTERN DOTS-128		BRAILLE PATTERN DOTS-1278	
Encodings	decimal	hex	dec	hex	dec	hex
Unicode	10307	U+2843	10371	U+2883	10435	U+28C3
UTF-8	226 161 131	E2 A1 83	226 162 131	E2 A2 83	226 163 131	E2 A3 83
Numeric character reference	&#10307;	&#x2843;	&#10371;	&#x2883;	&#10435;	&#x28C3;

	dots 127	dots 128	dots 1278
Gardner Salinas Braille	B (capital)	β (beta)	
Luxembourgish Braille	B (capital)		

== Related 8-dot kantenji patterns ==
In the Japanese kantenji braille, the standard 8-dot Braille patterns 23, 123, 234, and 1234 are the 8-dot braille patterns related to Braille pattern dots-12, since the two additional dots of kantenji patterns 012, 127, and 0127 are placed above the base 6-dot cell, instead of below, as in standard 8-dot braille.

Character information
Preview	⠆ (braille pattern dots-23)		⠇ (braille pattern dots-123)		⠎ (braille pattern dots-234)		⠏ (braille pattern dots-1234)	
Unicode name	BRAILLE PATTERN DOTS-23		BRAILLE PATTERN DOTS-123		BRAILLE PATTERN DOTS-234		BRAILLE PATTERN DOTS-1234	
Encodings	decimal	hex	dec	hex	dec	hex	dec	hex
Unicode	10246	U+2806	10247	U+2807	10254	U+280E	10255	U+280F
UTF-8	226 160 134	E2 A0 86	226 160 135	E2 A0 87	226 160 142	E2 A0 8E	226 160 143	E2 A0 8F
Numeric character reference	&#10246;	&#x2806;	&#10247;	&#x2807;	&#10254;	&#x280E;	&#10255;	&#x280F;

=== Kantenji using braille patterns 23, 123, 234, or 1234 ===
This listing includes kantenji using Braille pattern dots-12 for all 6349 kanji found in JIS C 6226-1978.

- - 糸

==== Variants and thematic compounds ====
- - い/糹/#2 + selector 2 = 丼
- - selector 2 + い/糹/#2 = 韋
- - selector 4 + い/糹/#2 = 離
  - - selector 4 + selector 4 + い/糹/#2 = 隹
- - selector 5 + い/糹/#2 = 井
- - selector 6 + い/糹/#2 = 尹
- - 数 + #2 = 二
- - 囗 + い/糹/#2 = 弐
- - ん/止 + い/糹/#2 = 正
- - せ/食 + い/糹/#2 = 生

==== Compounds of 糸 ====
- - い/糹/#2 + さ/阝 = 糾
- - い/糹/#2 + き/木 = 紀
- - い/糹/#2 + も/門 = 約
  - - く/艹 + い/糹/#2 + も/門 = 葯
- - い/糹/#2 + か/金 = 紆
- - い/糹/#2 + ふ/女 = 純
- - い/糹/#2 + ろ/十 = 紘
- - い/糹/#2 + ん/止 = 紙
- - い/糹/#2 + ゐ/幺 = 級
- - い/糹/#2 + り/分 = 紛
- - い/糹/#2 + ほ/方 = 紡
- - い/糹/#2 + た/⽥ = 細
  - - い/糹/#2 + た/⽥ + selector 4 = 紬
  - - い/糹/#2 + た/⽥ + ゐ/幺 = 縲
- - い/糹/#2 + し/巿 = 紳
- - い/糹/#2 + ぬ/力 = 紹
- - い/糹/#2 + す/発 = 終
- - い/糹/#2 + そ/馬 = 組
- - い/糹/#2 + は/辶 = 絆
- - い/糹/#2 + け/犬 = 経
- - い/糹/#2 + ち/竹 = 絞
- - い/糹/#2 + れ/口 = 絡
- - い/糹/#2 + と/戸 = 絣
- - い/糹/#2 + 囗 = 給
- - い/糹/#2 + 龸 = 統
  - - い/糹/#2 + 龸 + ち/竹 = 纐
  - - い/糹/#2 + 龸 + ゐ/幺 = 絃
- - い/糹/#2 + え/訁 = 絵
- - い/糹/#2 + ら/月 = 絹
  - - す/発 + い/糹/#2 + ら/月 = 羂
- - い/糹/#2 + の/禾 = 継
  - - い/糹/#2 + の/禾 + た/⽥ = 繙
  - - い/糹/#2 + い/糹/#2 + の/禾 = 繼
- - い/糹/#2 + つ/土 = 続
  - - い/糹/#2 + つ/土 + れ/口 = 纈
  - - い/糹/#2 + い/糹/#2 + つ/土 = 續
- - い/糹/#2 + ゆ/彳 = 綱
- - い/糹/#2 + こ/子 = 総
  - - い/糹/#2 + い/糹/#2 + こ/子 = 總
- - い/糹/#2 + 氷/氵 = 線
- - い/糹/#2 + ま/石 = 締
- - い/糹/#2 + へ/⺩ = 編
- - い/糹/#2 + 仁/亻 = 緩
- - い/糹/#2 + ひ/辶 = 練
- - い/糹/#2 + め/目 = 縄
- - い/糹/#2 + ⺼ = 縊
- - い/糹/#2 + て/扌 = 縛
- - い/糹/#2 + よ/广 = 縦
  - - い/糹/#2 + い/糹/#2 + よ/广 = 縱
- - い/糹/#2 + 宿 = 縮
- - い/糹/#2 + る/忄 = 縷
- - い/糹/#2 + を/貝 = 績
  - - い/糹/#2 + を/貝 + け/犬 = 纉
- - い/糹/#2 + や/疒 = 繃
- - い/糹/#2 + み/耳 = 繊
  - - い/糹/#2 + い/糹/#2 + み/耳 = 纖
- - い/糹/#2 + 日 = 織
- - い/糹/#2 + せ/食 = 繕
- - い/糹/#2 + う/宀/#3 = 繰
- - い/糹/#2 + む/車 = 繭
- - い/糹/#2 + い/糹/#2 + い/糹/#2 = 絲
- - い/糹/#2 + い/糹/#2 + け/犬 = 經
- - い/糹/#2 + い/糹/#2 + め/目 = 繩
- - い/糹/#2 + い/糹/#2 + え/訁 = 繪
- - い/糹/#2 + selector 6 + し/巿 = 絏
- - い/糹/#2 + selector 6 + み/耳 = 絽
- - い/糹/#2 + selector 4 + な/亻 = 紿
- - い/糹/#2 + selector 4 + の/禾 = 緞
- - い/糹/#2 + 龸 + selector 3 = 紊
- - い/糹/#2 + 宿 + を/貝 = 糺
- - い/糹/#2 + 比 + し/巿 = 紂
- - い/糹/#2 + 宿 + 比 = 紕
- - い/糹/#2 + ほ/方 + そ/馬 = 紗
- - い/糹/#2 + 宿 + え/訁 = 紜
- - い/糹/#2 + き/木 + を/貝 = 紮
- - い/糹/#2 + ろ/十 + よ/广 = 紲
- - い/糹/#2 + 数 + て/扌 = 紵
- - い/糹/#2 + 囗 + れ/口 = 絅
- - い/糹/#2 + よ/广 + こ/子 = 絋
- - い/糹/#2 + 宿 + ゆ/彳 = 絎
- - い/糹/#2 + 龸 + selector 2 = 絖
- - い/糹/#2 + 仁/亻 + ゆ/彳 = 絛
- - い/糹/#2 + 日 + す/発 = 絢
- - い/糹/#2 + 宿 + 囗 = 絨
- - い/糹/#2 + ふ/女 + れ/口 = 絮
- - い/糹/#2 + の/禾 + ゐ/幺 = 綉
- - い/糹/#2 + ふ/女 + 龸 = 綏
- - い/糹/#2 + い/糹/#2 + け/犬 = 經
- - い/糹/#2 + ぬ/力 + 心 = 綛
- - い/糹/#2 + う/宀/#3 + ね/示 = 綜
- - い/糹/#2 + と/戸 + け/犬 = 綟
- - い/糹/#2 + 囗 + つ/土 = 綢
- - い/糹/#2 + け/犬 + さ/阝 = 綣
- - い/糹/#2 + 龸 + 囗 = 綫
- - い/糹/#2 + と/戸 + れ/口 = 綮
- - い/糹/#2 + 宿 + と/戸 = 綯
- - い/糹/#2 + う/宀/#3 + ら/月 = 綰
- - い/糹/#2 + 宿 + ち/竹 = 綵
- - い/糹/#2 + 宿 + る/忄 = 綸
- - い/糹/#2 + け/犬 + か/金 = 綺
- - い/糹/#2 + う/宀/#3 + よ/广 = 綻
- - い/糹/#2 + 日 + と/戸 = 綽
- - い/糹/#2 + 宿 + す/発 = 綾
- - い/糹/#2 + ら/月 + た/⽥ = 緇
- - い/糹/#2 + さ/阝 + 龸 = 緕
- - い/糹/#2 + ひ/辶 + selector 3 = 緘
- - い/糹/#2 + 宿 + み/耳 = 緝
- - い/糹/#2 + み/耳 + ん/止 = 緡
- - い/糹/#2 + 宿 + よ/广 = 緤
- - い/糹/#2 + め/目 + selector 4 = 緬
- - い/糹/#2 + 氷/氵 + ゆ/彳 = 緻
- - い/糹/#2 + ひ/辶 + ふ/女 = 縅
- - い/糹/#2 + 日 + ひ/辶 = 縉
- - い/糹/#2 + そ/馬 + こ/子 = 縒
- - い/糹/#2 + し/巿 + ろ/十 = 縟
- - い/糹/#2 + う/宀/#3 + ま/石 = 縡
- - い/糹/#2 + 宿 + ま/石 = 縵
- - い/糹/#2 + に/氵 + ね/示 = 縹
- - い/糹/#2 + ひ/辶 + む/車 = 縺
- - い/糹/#2 + 心 + ま/石 = 縻
- - い/糹/#2 + む/車 + selector 2 = 繆
- - い/糹/#2 + ぬ/力 + ゆ/彳 = 繍
- - い/糹/#2 + ら/月 + 氷/氵 = 繖
- - い/糹/#2 + も/門 + ら/月 = 繝
- - い/糹/#2 + 宿 + つ/土 = 繞
- - い/糹/#2 + ゆ/彳 + む/車 = 繦
- - い/糹/#2 + ち/竹 + え/訁 = 繧
- - い/糹/#2 + い/糹/#2 + め/目 = 繩
- - い/糹/#2 + い/糹/#2 + え/訁 = 繪
- - い/糹/#2 + ち/竹 + の/禾 = 繻
- - い/糹/#2 + う/宀/#3 + を/貝 = 繽
- - い/糹/#2 + す/発 + ⺼ = 繿
- - い/糹/#2 + 宿 + さ/阝 = 纃
- - い/糹/#2 + 龸 + み/耳 = 纎
- - い/糹/#2 + ふ/女 + を/貝 = 纓
- - い/糹/#2 + ぬ/力 + 宿 = 纔
- - い/糹/#2 + め/目 + す/発 = 纜

==== Compounds of 韋 ====
- - な/亻 + い/糹/#2 = 偉
- - 心 + い/糹/#2 = 葦
- - ひ/辶 + い/糹/#2 = 違
- - ゐ/幺 + い/糹/#2 = 緯
- - 囗 + 宿 + い/糹/#2 = 圍
- - し/巿 + 宿 + い/糹/#2 = 幃
- - え/訁 + 宿 + い/糹/#2 = 諱
- - ろ/十 + 宿 + い/糹/#2 = 韓
- - い/糹/#2 + 宿 + ぬ/力 = 韜

==== Compounds of 離 and 隹 ====
- - に/氵 + selector 4 + い/糹/#2 = 漓
- - へ/⺩ + selector 4 + い/糹/#2 = 璃
- - お/頁 + selector 4 + い/糹/#2 = 魑
- - の/禾 + selector 4 + い/糹/#2 = 黐
- - う/宀/#3 + selector 4 + い/糹/#2 = 寉
- - 囗 + selector 4 + い/糹/#2 = 雕
- - ち/竹 + selector 4 + い/糹/#2 = 霍
- - 仁/亻 + い/糹/#2 = 催
- - 氷/氵 + い/糹/#2 = 准
  - - も/門 + 氷/氵 + い/糹/#2 = 匯
- - れ/口 + い/糹/#2 = 唯
- - つ/土 + い/糹/#2 = 堆
- - け/犬 + い/糹/#2 = 奪
- - し/巿 + い/糹/#2 = 帷
- - る/忄 + い/糹/#2 = 惟
  - - る/忄 + い/糹/#2 + 火 = 憔
- - み/耳 + い/糹/#2 = 截
- - て/扌 + い/糹/#2 = 推
- - ま/石 + い/糹/#2 = 確
- - の/禾 + い/糹/#2 = 稚
- - い/糹/#2 + い/糹/#2 = 維
  - - す/発 + い/糹/#2 = 羅
    - - 心 + す/発 + い/糹/#2 = 蘿
    - - ひ/辶 + す/発 + い/糹/#2 = 邏
    - - か/金 + す/発 + い/糹/#2 = 鑼
- - え/訁 + い/糹/#2 = 誰
- - か/金 + い/糹/#2 = 錐
- - ほ/方 + い/糹/#2 = 雀
- - め/目 + い/糹/#2 = 雅
- - き/木 + い/糹/#2 = 集
  - - ね/示 + き/木 + い/糹/#2 = 襍
- - と/戸 + い/糹/#2 = 雇
- - 比 + い/糹/#2 = 雌
- - 龸 + い/糹/#2 = 雑
  - - 龸 + 龸 + い/糹/#2 = 雜
- - む/車 + い/糹/#2 = 雖
- - も/門 + い/糹/#2 = 雛
- - く/艹 + い/糹/#2 = 難
  - - な/亻 + く/艹 + い/糹/#2 = 儺
  - - て/扌 + く/艹 + い/糹/#2 = 攤
  - - に/氵 + く/艹 + い/糹/#2 = 灘
- - い/糹/#2 + ゑ/訁 = 隻
  - - め/目 + い/糹/#2 + ゑ/訁 = 矍
- - ろ/十 + い/糹/#2 = 雄
- - い/糹/#2 + 火 = 焦
  - - 心 + い/糹/#2 + 火 = 蕉
  - - き/木 + い/糹/#2 + 火 = 樵
- - れ/口 + 宿 + い/糹/#2 = 售
- - や/疒 + う/宀/#3 + い/糹/#2 = 崔
  - - て/扌 + 宿 + い/糹/#2 = 摧
- - る/忄 + 宿 + い/糹/#2 = 懼
- - 心 + 宿 + い/糹/#2 = 椎
- - に/氵 + 宿 + い/糹/#2 = 淮
- - ま/石 + 宿 + い/糹/#2 = 碓
- - ち/竹 + う/宀/#3 + い/糹/#2 = 籬
- - 心 + う/宀/#3 + い/糹/#2 = 藺
- - ゆ/彳 + 宿 + い/糹/#2 = 衢
- - い/糹/#2 + 宿 + ろ/十 = 隼
- - い/糹/#2 + 比 + 囗 = 雋
  - - か/金 + 宿 + い/糹/#2 = 鐫
  - - な/亻 + 宿 + い/糹/#2 = 儁
- - め/目 + 宿 + い/糹/#2 = 雎
- - そ/馬 + 宿 + い/糹/#2 = 騅
- - い/糹/#2 + 宿 + せ/食 = 鷦

==== Compounds of 井 ====
- - た/⽥ + selector 5 + い/糹/#2 = 畊
- - こ/子 + い/糹/#2 = 耕
- - い/糹/#2 + う/宀/#3 + り/分 = 穽
- - ほ/方 + selector 5 + い/糹/#2 = 舛
  - - き/木 + selector 5 + い/糹/#2 = 桝

==== Compounds of 尹 ====
- - ち/竹 + selector 6 + い/糹/#2 = 笋
- - い/糹/#2 + な/亻 = 伊

==== Compounds of 二 ====
- - ち/竹 + 宿 + い/糹/#2 = 竺

==== Compounds of 弐 ====
- - selector 1 + 囗 + い/糹/#2 = 弍
  - - ⺼ + 囗 + い/糹/#2 = 膩
  - - 囗 + 囗 + い/糹/#2 = 貳
- - selector 4 + 囗 + い/糹/#2 = 貮

==== Compounds of 正 ====
- - ゆ/彳 + い/糹/#2 = 征
- - や/疒 + い/糹/#2 = 症
- - ゑ/訁 + い/糹/#2 = 証
- - 心 + ん/止 + い/糹/#2 = 柾
- - ふ/女 + ん/止 + い/糹/#2 = 歪
- - か/金 + ん/止 + い/糹/#2 = 鉦

==== Compounds of 生 ====
- - ふ/女 + い/糹/#2 = 姓
- - 日 + い/糹/#2 = 星
  - - せ/食 + 日 + い/糹/#2 = 醒
  - - る/忄 + 日 + い/糹/#2 = 惺
  - - け/犬 + 日 + い/糹/#2 = 猩
  - - ⺼ + 日 + い/糹/#2 = 腥
- - そ/馬 + い/糹/#2 = 牲
- - よ/广 + い/糹/#2 = 産
- - ゆ/彳 + せ/食 + い/糹/#2 = 徃
- - ほ/方 + せ/食 + い/糹/#2 = 旌
- - な/亻 + せ/食 + い/糹/#2 = 甦
- - ち/竹 + せ/食 + い/糹/#2 = 笙

==== Other compounds ====
- - た/⽥ + い/糹/#2 = 対
  - - た/⽥ + た/⽥ + い/糹/#2 = 對
- - う/宀/#3 + い/糹/#2 = 彙
- - は/辶 + い/糹/#2 = 拝
  - - は/辶 + は/辶 + い/糹/#2 = 拜
    - - に/氵 + は/辶 + い/糹/#2 = 湃
- - に/氵 + い/糹/#2 = 湿
- - ⺼ + い/糹/#2 = 胤
- - さ/阝 + い/糹/#2 = 降
- - ゑ/訁 + ゑ/訁 + い/糹/#2 = 證
- - に/氵 + に/氵 + い/糹/#2 = 濕
- - さ/阝 + 宿 + い/糹/#2 = 隰
