= Braille ASCII =

ASCII character set representing all possible dot combinations in six-dot Braille

Braille ASCII (or more formally The North American Braille ASCII Code, also known as SimBraille) is a subset of the ASCII character set which uses 64 of the printable ASCII characters to represent all possible dot combinations in six-dot braille. It was developed around 1969 and, despite originally being known as North American Braille ASCII, it is now used internationally.

== Overview ==
Braille ASCII uses the 64 ASCII characters between 32 and 95 inclusive. Each letter in ASCII correspond to its equivalent value in uncontracted English Braille. Note however that, unlike standard print, there is only one braille symbol for each letter of the alphabet. Therefore, in braille, all letters are lower-case by default, unless preceded by a capitalization indicator (⠠ dot 6).

The numbers 1 through 9 and 0 correspond to the letters a through j, except that they are preceded by the numeric indicator (⠼ dots 3-4-5-6). For example, ⠉ dots 1-4 represents c, but when this symbol is preceded by the numeric indicator it is 3. Other symbols may or may not correspond to their braille values. For example, ⠤ dots 3-6 represents - in braille ASCII, and this is the braille hyphen, but ⠿ dots 1-2-3-4-5-6 represents =, and this is not the equals sign in Braille.

If Braille ASCII is viewed in a word processor, it will look like a jumbled mix of letters, numbers, and punctuation. However, there are several fonts available, many of them free, which allow the user to view and print Braille ASCII as simulated braille, i.e. a graphical representation of braille characters.

== Uses ==
Braille ASCII was originally designed to be a means for storing and transmitting six-dot Braille in a digital format, and this continues to be its primary usage today. Because it uses standard characters available on computer keyboards, it can be easily typed and edited with a standard word processor. Many Braille embossers receive their input in Braille ASCII, and nearly all Braille translation software can import and export this format.

Many institutions which produce braille materials distribute BRF files. BRF is a file that can represent contracted or uncontracted (i.e. grade 1 or grade 2) Unified English Braille, English Braille and non-English languages. BRF files contain plain Braille ASCII plus spaces, Carriage Return, Line Feed, and Form Feed ASCII control characters. The spaces, Carriage Returns, Line Feeds, and Form feeds are sufficient to specify how the Braille is formatted. Previously BRF contained some additional specialized formatting instructions, but now BRF is formatted exactly like Web-Braille/BARD. BRF files can be embossed with a braille embosser or printed, read on a refreshable braille display, or imperfectly back-translated into standard text which can then be read by a screen reader or other similar program. Many find BRF files to be a more convenient way to receive brailled content, and it has increasing use as a distribution format. If a SimBraille font is downloaded and installed a BRF file can be opened in WordPad, Apache OpenOffice, Microsoft Word, Apple Pages, etc., and the Braille will appear correctly rendered as 2 dimensional, non-tactile, visual 6 dot braille characters when the font is set to SimBraille.

Unicode includes a means for encoding eight-dot braille; however, Braille ASCII continues to be the preferred format for encoding six-dot braille.

== Braille ASCII values ==
Standard Braille 6-dot order.

The following table shows the arrangement of characters, with the hexadecimal value, corresponding ASCII character, binary notation matching the standard dot numbers (see the image on the left), Braille Unicode glyph, and general meaning for English (the actual meaning may change depending on context).

ASCII hex	ASCII glyph	Braille dots (1 to 6)	Braille glyph	Unicode Braille glyph	English Braille meaning
20	(space)	000000	⠀ (braille pattern blank)	⠀	(space)
21	!	011101	⠮ (braille pattern dots-2346)	⠮	the
22	"	000010	⠐ (braille pattern dots-5)	⠐	(contraction)
23	#	001111	⠼ (braille pattern dots-3456)	⠼	(number prefix)
24	$	110101	⠫ (braille pattern dots-1246)	⠫	ed
25	%	100101	⠩ (braille pattern dots-146)	⠩	sh
26	&	111101	⠯ (braille pattern dots-12346)	⠯	and
27	'	001000	⠄ (braille pattern dots-3)	⠄	'
28	(	111011	⠷ (braille pattern dots-12356)	⠷	of
29	)	011111	⠾ (braille pattern dots-23456)	⠾	with
2A	*	100001	⠡ (braille pattern dots-16)	⠡	ch
2B	+	001101	⠬ (braille pattern dots-346)	⠬	ing
2C	,	000001	⠠ (braille pattern dots-6)	⠠	(uppercase prefix)
2D	-	001001	⠤ (braille pattern dots-36)	⠤	-
2E	.	000101	⠨ (braille pattern dots-46)	⠨	(italic prefix)
2F	/	001100	⠌ (braille pattern dots-34)	⠌	st or /
30	0	001011	⠴ (braille pattern dots-356)	⠴	”
31	1	010000	⠂ (braille pattern dots-2)	⠂	,
32	2	011000	⠆ (braille pattern dots-23)	⠆	;
33	3	010010	⠒ (braille pattern dots-25)	⠒	:
34	4	010011	⠲ (braille pattern dots-256)	⠲	.
35	5	010001	⠢ (braille pattern dots-26)	⠢	en
36	6	011010	⠖ (braille pattern dots-235)	⠖	!
37	7	011011	⠶ (braille pattern dots-2356)	⠶	( or )
38	8	011001	⠦ (braille pattern dots-236)	⠦	“ or ?
39	9	001010	⠔ (braille pattern dots-35)	⠔	in
3A	:	100011	⠱ (braille pattern dots-156)	⠱	wh
3B	;	000011	⠰ (braille pattern dots-56)	⠰	(letter prefix)
3C	<	110001	⠣ (braille pattern dots-126)	⠣	gh
3D	=	111111	⠿ (braille pattern dots-123456)	⠿	for
3E	>	001110	⠜ (braille pattern dots-345)	⠜	ar
3F	?	100111	⠹ (braille pattern dots-1456)	⠹	th

ASCII hex	ASCII glyph	Braille dots (1 to 6)	Braille glyph	Unicode Braille glyph	English Braille meaning
40	@	000100	⠈ (braille pattern dots-4)	⠈	(accent prefix)
41	A	100000	⠁ (braille pattern dots-1)	⠁	a
42	B	110000	⠃ (braille pattern dots-12)	⠃	b
43	C	100100	⠉ (braille pattern dots-14)	⠉	c
44	D	100110	⠙ (braille pattern dots-145)	⠙	d
45	E	100010	⠑ (braille pattern dots-15)	⠑	e
46	F	110100	⠋ (braille pattern dots-124)	⠋	f
47	G	110110	⠛ (braille pattern dots-1245)	⠛	g
48	H	110010	⠓ (braille pattern dots-125)	⠓	h
49	I	010100	⠊ (braille pattern dots-24)	⠊	i
4A	J	010110	⠚ (braille pattern dots-245)	⠚	j
4B	K	101000	⠅ (braille pattern dots-13)	⠅	k
4C	L	111000	⠇ (braille pattern dots-123)	⠇	l
4D	M	101100	⠍ (braille pattern dots-134)	⠍	m
4E	N	101110	⠝ (braille pattern dots-1345)	⠝	n
4F	O	101010	⠕ (braille pattern dots-135)	⠕	o
50	P	111100	⠏ (braille pattern dots-1234)	⠏	p
51	Q	111110	⠟ (braille pattern dots-12345)	⠟	q
52	R	111010	⠗ (braille pattern dots-1235)	⠗	r
53	S	011100	⠎ (braille pattern dots-234)	⠎	s
54	T	011110	⠞ (braille pattern dots-2345)	⠞	t
55	U	101001	⠥ (braille pattern dots-136)	⠥	u
56	V	111001	⠧ (braille pattern dots-1236)	⠧	v
57	W	010111	⠺ (braille pattern dots-2456)	⠺	w
58	X	101101	⠭ (braille pattern dots-1346)	⠭	x
59	Y	101111	⠽ (braille pattern dots-13456)	⠽	y
5A	Z	101011	⠵ (braille pattern dots-1356)	⠵	z
5B	[	010101	⠪ (braille pattern dots-246)	⠪	ow
5C	\	110011	⠳ (braille pattern dots-1256)	⠳	ou
5D	]	110111	⠻ (braille pattern dots-12456)	⠻	er
5E		000110	⠘ (braille pattern dots-45)	⠘	(currency prefix)
5F	_	000111	⠸ (braille pattern dots-456)	⠸	(contraction)

The following shows the "ASCII glyph" under the associated Braille dots pattern from the table above, sorted according to the reverse lexicographical order of "Braille dots" patterns. It may be used to encode the above table. (Note that Unicode Braille characters are U+2800 through U+283F, with their code points being in reverse lexicographical order of the above table's "Braille dots" column, and that the symbol at top of the first cell is not an ASCII space but the empty Braille symbol U+2800):

⠀
⠁
A⠂
1⠃
B⠄
'⠅
K⠆
2⠇
L⠈
@⠉
C⠊
I⠋
F⠌
/⠍
M⠎
S⠏
P⠐
"⠑
E⠒
3⠓
H⠔
9⠕
O⠖
6⠗
R⠘
^⠙
D⠚
J⠛
G⠜
>⠝
N⠞
T⠟
Q⠠
,⠡
*⠢
5⠣
<⠤
-⠥
U⠦
8⠧
V⠨
.⠩
%⠪
[⠫
$⠬
+⠭
X⠮
!⠯
&⠰
;⠱
:⠲
4⠳
\⠴
0⠵
Z⠶
7⠷
(⠸
_⠹
?⠺
W⠻
]⠼
#⠽
Y⠾
)⠿
=

== Unused ASCII values ==
Only 64 characters are needed to represent all possible combinations of 6-dot braille (including space), so not all ASCII values are needed for Braille ASCII.

The 26 Basic Latin lower-case letters (a to (z) are not normally used, but might be interpreted as having the same dot patterns as their 26 upper-case equivalents. The 5 other printable ASCII punctuation characters (`, {, |, }, and ~) are not used and their Braille ASCII rendition is not defined.

Braille ASCII is merely a subset of the ASCII table that can be used to represent all possible combinations of 6-dot braille. It is not to be confused with the Computer Braille Code, which can represent all ASCII values in braille.

== See also ==
- List of binary codes
- Braille Patterns (Unicode)
