= Persian Braille =

Braille system for Persian

Persian Braille ⠃⠗⠊⠇⠀⠋⠁⠗⠎⠊
- Script type: abjad
- Print basis: Persian alphabet
- Languages: Persian

Related scripts
- Parent systems: Braille: English Braille; Persian Braille
- Child systems: Urdu Braille

Persian Braille (Persian: بریل فارسی) is the braille alphabet for the Persian language. It is largely compatible with Arabic Braille, which may be found (in uncontracted form) within Persian Braille texts. There are a few additional Persian letters that do not exist in Arabic.

Persian Braille is read from left to right, following the international convention. Numbers are also left to right, rather than switching direction as they do in printed Arabic.

== Persian Braille charts ==
=== Letters ===
Print	آ	ا	ب	پ	ت	ث	ج	ﭺ	ح	خ	د	ذ
Braille	⠜ (braille pattern dots-345)	⠁ (braille pattern dots-1)	⠃ (braille pattern dots-12)	⠏ (braille pattern dots-1234)	⠞ (braille pattern dots-2345)	⠹ (braille pattern dots-1456)	⠚ (braille pattern dots-245)	⠉ (braille pattern dots-14)	⠱ (braille pattern dots-156)	⠭ (braille pattern dots-1346)	⠙ (braille pattern dots-145)	⠮ (braille pattern dots-2346)

Print	ر	ز	ژ	س	ش	ص	ض	ط	ظ	ع	غ
Braille	⠗ (braille pattern dots-1235)	⠵ (braille pattern dots-1356)	⠬ (braille pattern dots-346)	⠎ (braille pattern dots-234)	⠩ (braille pattern dots-146)	⠯ (braille pattern dots-12346)	⠫ (braille pattern dots-1246)	⠾ (braille pattern dots-23456)	⠿ (braille pattern dots-123456)	⠷ (braille pattern dots-12356)	⠣ (braille pattern dots-126)

Print	ف	ق	ک	گ	ل	م	ن	و	ه	ى	
Braille	⠋ (braille pattern dots-124)	⠟ (braille pattern dots-12345)	⠅ (braille pattern dots-13)	⠛ (braille pattern dots-1245)	⠇ (braille pattern dots-123)	⠍ (braille pattern dots-134)	⠝ (braille pattern dots-1345)	⠺ (braille pattern dots-2456)	⠓ (braille pattern dots-125)	⠊ (braille pattern dots-24)	⠕ (braille pattern dots-135)

=== Numbers and arithmetic ===
Numbers are the same as in English Braille. Arithmetical symbols are introduced by a separate braille prefix.

Print		۱	۲	۳	۴	۵	۶	۷	۸	۹	۰
Braille	⠼ (braille pattern dots-3456)	⠁ (braille pattern dots-1)	⠃ (braille pattern dots-12)	⠉ (braille pattern dots-14)	⠙ (braille pattern dots-145)	⠑ (braille pattern dots-15)	⠋ (braille pattern dots-124)	⠛ (braille pattern dots-1245)	⠓ (braille pattern dots-125)	⠊ (braille pattern dots-24)	⠚ (braille pattern dots-245)
Print		+		−		×		÷		=	
Braille		⠰ (braille pattern dots-56) ⠖ (braille pattern dots-235)		⠰ (braille pattern dots-56) ⠤ (braille pattern dots-36)		⠰ (braille pattern dots-56) ⠦ (braille pattern dots-236)		⠰ (braille pattern dots-56) ⠲ (braille pattern dots-256)		⠰ (braille pattern dots-56) ⠶ (braille pattern dots-2356)	

Numbers follow operands without a space. For example,

۲ × ۳ = ۶

is in braille,

⠼⠃⠀⠰⠦⠼⠉⠀⠰⠶⠼⠋

== Punctuation ==
Print	,	.	?	!	;	:	–	—	“ ... ”	( ... )
Braille	⠂ (braille pattern dots-2)	⠲ (braille pattern dots-256)	⠦ (braille pattern dots-236)	⠖ (braille pattern dots-235)	⠆ (braille pattern dots-23)	⠒ (braille pattern dots-25)	⠤ (braille pattern dots-36)	⠤ (braille pattern dots-36)	...	...

== See also ==
- Arabic Braille
- Tajik Braille
- Urdu Braille
