= Cantonese Braille =

Braille script used to write Cantonese

Cantonese Braille ⠞⠖⠁⠉⠊⠂
- Script type: Semi-syllabary
- Languages: Cantonese

Related scripts
- Parent systems: Braille: Cantonese Braille

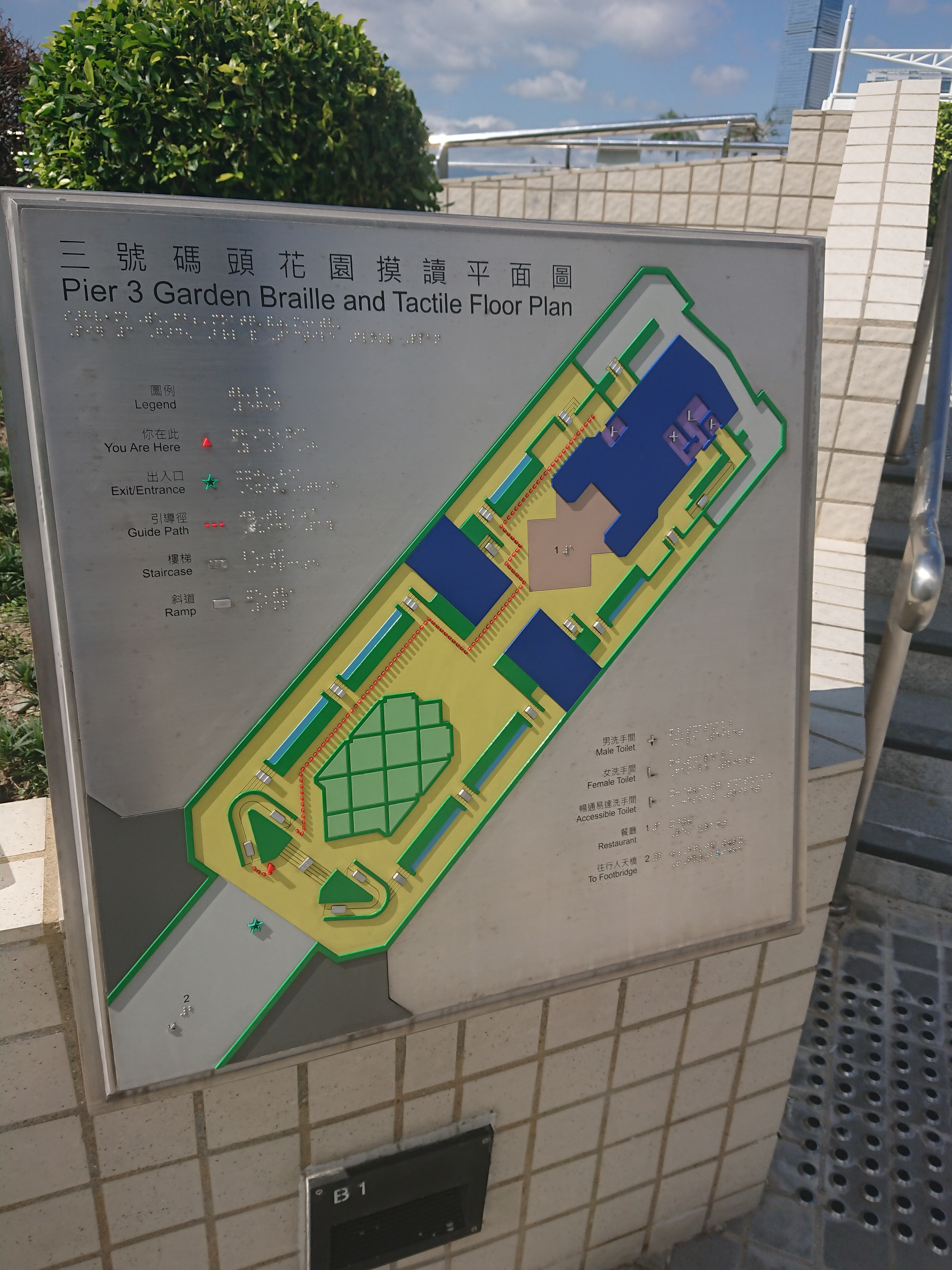
Braille map at Central Pier 3, Hong Kong, with English and Cantonese Braille text.

Cantonese Braille (Chinese: 粵語點字) is a braille script used to write Cantonese in Hong Kong and Macau. It is locally referred to as tim chi (點字, dim2zi6) 'dot characters' or more commonly but ambiguously tuk chi (凸字, dat6zi6) 'raised characters'. Although Cantonese is written in Chinese characters, Cantonese Braille is purely phonetic, with punctuation, digits and Latin letters from the original Braille. It can be mixed with English text.

== Charts ==
Each syllable is divided into three parts: the initial consonant, the rime (vowel and any final consonant), and the tone. For example, 盤, pun4 is written ⟨⠯⠮⠄⟩, with initial p, final un and tone 4. (See Cantonese phonology.) Among initials, aspirated consonants (p t ts k kw = p' t' ts' k' kw') are derived by adding dots to the unaspirated consonants (b d dz g gw = p t ts k kw):

Initials
| Braille | ⠏ (braille pattern dots-1234) | ⠯ (braille pattern dots-12346) | ⠍ (braille pattern dots-134) | ⠋ (braille pattern dots-124) | |
| Pinyin | b | p | m | f | |
| Braille | ⠞ (braille pattern dots-2345) | ⠾ (braille pattern dots-23456) | ⠝ (braille pattern dots-1345) | | ⠇ (braille pattern dots-123) |
| Pinyin | d | t | n | | l |
| Braille | ⠅ (braille pattern dots-13) | ⠗ (braille pattern dots-1235) | ⠛ (braille pattern dots-1245) | ⠓ (braille pattern dots-125) | |
| Pinyin | g | k | ng | h | |
| Braille | ⠟ (braille pattern dots-12345) | ⠻ (braille pattern dots-12456) | | | ⠺ (braille pattern dots-2456) |
| Pinyin | gw | kw | | | w |
| Braille | ⠉ (braille pattern dots-14) | ⠭ (braille pattern dots-1346) | | ⠎ (braille pattern dots-234) | ⠚ (braille pattern dots-245) |
| Pinyin | dz | ts | | s | j |

- M and ng may also be used as rimes (syllabic nasals), in which case they are followed directly by the tone.
- When i or u (but not y) begins a syllable, a dummy consonant j or w is prefixed.

Rimes
| Braille | ⠃ (braille pattern dots-12) | ⠬ (braille pattern dots-346) | ⠌ (braille pattern dots-34) | ⠜ (braille pattern dots-345) | ⠘ (braille pattern dots-45) | ⠉ (braille pattern dots-14) | ⠏ (braille pattern dots-1234) | ⠞ (braille pattern dots-2345) | ⠅ (braille pattern dots-13) |
| Pinyin | aa | aai | aau | aam | aan | aang | aap | aat | aak |
| Braille | | ⠩ (braille pattern dots-146) | ⠡ (braille pattern dots-16) | ⠸ (braille pattern dots-456) | ⠫ (braille pattern dots-1246) | ⠛ (braille pattern dots-1245) | ⠢ (braille pattern dots-26) | ⠔ (braille pattern dots-35) | ⠨ (braille pattern dots-46) |
| Pinyin | – | ai | au | am | an | ang | ap | at | ak |
| Braille | ⠑ (braille pattern dots-15) | ⠓ (braille pattern dots-125) | (NA) | (NA) | | ⠶ (braille pattern dots-2356) | (NA) | | ⠺ (braille pattern dots-2456) |
| Pinyin | e | ei | eu | em | – | eng | ep | – | ek |
| Braille | ⠙ (braille pattern dots-145) | ⠊ (braille pattern dots-24) | ⠽ (braille pattern dots-13456) | ⠖ (braille pattern dots-235) | ⠲ (braille pattern dots-256) | ⠴ (braille pattern dots-356) | ⠯ (braille pattern dots-12346) | ⠾ (braille pattern dots-23456) | ⠗ (braille pattern dots-1235) |
| Pinyin | sz† | i | iu | im | in | ing | ip | it | ik |
| Braille | ⠕ (braille pattern dots-135) | ⠣ (braille pattern dots-126) | ⠧ (braille pattern dots-1236) | ⠇ (braille pattern dots-123) | ⠝ (braille pattern dots-1345) | ⠰ (braille pattern dots-56) | ⠍ (braille pattern dots-134) | ⠋ (braille pattern dots-124) | ⠻ (braille pattern dots-12456) |
| Pinyin | o | oi | ou | om† | on | ong | op† | ot | ok |
| Braille | ⠥ (braille pattern dots-136) | ⠳ (braille pattern dots-1256) | | | ⠮ (braille pattern dots-2346) | ⠦ (braille pattern dots-236) | | ⠵ (braille pattern dots-1356) | ⠟ (braille pattern dots-12345) |
| Pinyin | u | ui | – | – | un | ung | – | ut | uk |
| Braille | ⠱ (braille pattern dots-156) | ⠚ (braille pattern dots-245) | | | ⠎ (braille pattern dots-234) | ⠒ (braille pattern dots-25) | | ⠭ (braille pattern dots-1346) | ⠪ (braille pattern dots-246) |
| Pinyin | oe | oey | – | – | oen | oeng | – | oet | oek |
| Braille | ⠹ (braille pattern dots-1456) | | | | ⠆ (braille pattern dots-23) | | | ⠷ (braille pattern dots-12356) | |
| Pinyin | y | – | – | – | yn | – | – | yt | – |

† represents the symbol was abolished in the revised version in 1990.

The rimes eu, em, ep do not exist in braille.

High tone (tones 1 and 7) is not transcribed. Otherwise tone is written after the rime, as follows:

Tones
| Braille | ⠁ (braille pattern dots-1) | ⠈ (braille pattern dots-4) | ⠄ (braille pattern dots-3) | ⠠ (braille pattern dots-6) | ⠂ (braille pattern dots-2) | ⠐ (braille pattern dots-5) | ⠄ (braille pattern dots-3) |
| Pinyin | 2 | 3 | 4 | 5 | 6 | 8 | 9 |

In numerical order, the cells are as follows:

| 0 | main sequence | | | | | | | | | | suppl. | |
|---|---|---|---|---|---|---|---|---|---|---|---|---|
| ⠀ | ⠁ t2 | ⠃ a | ⠉ dz-aang | ⠙ (NA) | ⠑ e | ⠋ f-ot | ⠛ ng-ang | ⠓ h-ei | ⠊ i | ⠚ j-oey | ⠈ t3 | ⠘ aan |
| ⠄ t4/9 | ⠅ g-aak | ⠇ l- | ⠍ m-m | ⠝ n-on | ⠕ o | ⠏ b-aap | ⠟ gw-uk | ⠗ k-ik | ⠎ s-oen | ⠞ d-aat | ⠌ aau | ⠜ aam |
| ⠤ (NA) | ⠥ u | ⠧ ou | ⠭ ts-oet | ⠽ iu | ⠵ ut | ⠯ p-ip | ⠿ (NA) | ⠷ yt | ⠮ un | ⠾ t-it | ⠬ aai | ⠼ (NA) |
| ⠠ t5 | ⠡ au | ⠣ oi | ⠩ ai | ⠹ y | ⠱ oe | ⠫ an | ⠻ kw-ok | ⠳ ui | ⠪ oek | ⠺ w-ek | ⠨ ak | ⠸ am |
| | ⠂ t6 | ⠆ yn | ⠒ oeng | ⠲ in | ⠢ ap | ⠖ im | ⠶ eng | ⠦ ung | ⠔ at | ⠴ ing | ⠐ t8 | ⠰ ong |

=== Punctuation ===
Some of the punctuation marks are distinguished from the onset or rime of a syllable by the strategic use of the ⠀ space. The spaces are therefore included in the table below, though they are not technically part of the punctuation mark.

| Braille | ⠿ (braille pattern dots-123456) ⠀ (braille pattern blank) | | ⠦ (braille pattern dots-236) ⠀ (braille pattern blank) | ⠮ (braille pattern dots-2346) ⠀ (braille pattern blank) | ⠒ (braille pattern dots-25) ⠀ (braille pattern blank) | ⠢ (braille pattern dots-26) ⠀ (braille pattern blank) | ⠤ (braille pattern dots-36) ⠄ (braille pattern dots-3) | ⠤ (braille pattern dots-36) | ⠀ (braille pattern blank) ⠄ (braille pattern dots-3) | |
| Print | 。 | | ? | ! | : | ; | - | — | … | |
| Braille | ⠰ (braille pattern dots-56) ⠆ (braille pattern dots-23) | | ⠀ (braille pattern blank) ⠶ (braille pattern dots-2356) | ⠶ (braille pattern dots-2356) ⠀ (braille pattern blank) | ⠀ (braille pattern blank) ⠠ (braille pattern dots-6) ⠶ (braille pattern dots-2356) | ⠶ (braille pattern dots-2356) ⠄ (braille pattern dots-3) ⠀ (braille pattern blank) | ⠀ (braille pattern blank) ⠣ (braille pattern dots-126) | ⠜ (braille pattern dots-345) ⠀ (braille pattern blank) | ⠀ (braille pattern blank) ⠠ (braille pattern dots-6) ⠣ (braille pattern dots-126) | ⠜ (braille pattern dots-345) ⠄ (braille pattern dots-3) ⠀ (braille pattern blank) |
| Print | · | | ( | ) | [ | ] | 《 | 》 | 〈 | 〉 |
| Braille | ⠤ (braille pattern dots-36) | ⠘ (braille pattern dots-45) | ⠀ (braille pattern blank) ⠦ (braille pattern dots-236) | ⠴ (braille pattern dots-356) ⠀ (braille pattern blank) | ⠀ (braille pattern blank) ⠠ (braille pattern dots-6) ⠦ (braille pattern dots-236) | ⠴ (braille pattern dots-356) ⠄ (braille pattern dots-3) ⠀ (braille pattern blank) | ⠀ (braille pattern blank) ⠷ (braille pattern dots-12356) | ⠻ (braille pattern dots-12456) ⠀ (braille pattern blank) | ⠀ (braille pattern blank) ⠸ (braille pattern dots-456) | ⠵ (braille pattern dots-1356) ⠀ (braille pattern blank) |
| Print | , | 、 | “ | ” | ‘ | ’ | start emph. | end emph. | start name | end name |

The emphasis marks, ⠷⠻ are equivalent to running dots alongside the characters in print, while proper names are marked in print by an underline or overline.

== See also ==
- Cantonese
- Chinese Braille
