= S. L. Wong (disambiguation) =

S. L. Wong may refer to:

- S. L. Wong
- S. L. Wong (phonetic symbols), IPA-based transcription scheme written by Wong Shik Ling
- S. L. Wong (romanisation), Romanisation scheme written by Wong Shik Ling
