= ILE romanization of Cantonese =

Romanization system for Cantonese

The Institute of Language in Education Scheme (Chinese: 教院式拼音方案) also known as the List of Cantonese Pronunciation of Commonly-used Chinese Characters romanization scheme (常用字廣州話讀音表), ILE scheme, and Cantonese Pinyin, is a romanization system for Cantonese developed by Ping-Chiu Thomas Yu (Chinese: 余秉昭) in 1971, and subsequently modified by the Education Department of Hong Kong (now the Education Bureau) and Zhan Bohui (詹伯慧) of the Chinese Dialects Research Centre of the Jinan University, Guangdong, PRC, and honorary professor of the School of Chinese, University of Hong Kong. It is the only romanization system accepted by Education and Manpower Bureau of Hong Kong and Hong Kong Examinations and Assessment Authority.

The Institute of Education in its name refers to the Institute of Language in Education (語文教育學院), which later became part of the Hong Kong Institute of Education, now the Education University of Hong Kong.

== Pinyin ==
The ILE system directly corresponds to the S. L. Wong system, an IPA-based phonemic transcription system used in A Chinese Syllabary Pronounced According to the Dialect of Canton by Wong Shik Ling. Generally, if an IPA symbol is also a basic Latin letter, the same symbol is used directly in the romanization (with the exception of the IPA symbol "a"); and if the IPA symbol is not a basic Latin letter, it is romanized using basic Latin letters. Thus, /a/→aa, /ɐ/→a, /ɛ/→e, /ɔ/→o, /œ/→oe, /ŋ/→ng. This results in a system which is both easy to learn and type but is still useful for academics.

In the following table (based on Zhan's variant), the first row inside a cell shows the ILE, the second row shows a representative "narrow transcription" in IPA, while the third row shows the corresponding IPA "broad transcription" using the S. L. Wong system.

== Initials ==
b [p] 〔b〕	p [pʰ] 〔p〕	m [m] 〔m〕	f [f] 〔f〕	
d [t] 〔d〕	t [tʰ] 〔t〕	n [n] 〔n〕		l [l] 〔l〕
g [k] 〔ɡ〕	k [kʰ] 〔k〕	ng [ŋ] 〔ŋ〕	h [h] 〔h〕	
gw [kʷ] 〔ɡw〕	kw [kʷʰ] 〔kw〕			w [w] 〔w〕
dz [ts] 〔dz〕	ts [tsʰ] 〔ts〕		s [s] 〔s〕	j [j] 〔j〕

== Finals ==
aa [aː] 〔a〕	aai [aːi] 〔ai〕	aau [aːu] 〔au〕	aam [aːm] 〔am〕	aan [aːn] 〔an〕	aang [aːŋ] 〔aŋ〕	aap [aːp] 〔ap〕	aat [aːt] 〔at〕	aak [aːk] 〔ak〕
	ai [ɐi] 〔ɐi〕	au [ɐu] 〔ɐu〕	am [ɐm] 〔ɐm〕	an [ɐn] 〔ɐn〕	ang [ɐŋ] 〔ɐŋ〕	ap [ɐp] 〔ɐp〕	at [ɐt] 〔ɐt〕	ak [ɐk] 〔ɐk〕
e [ɛː] 〔ɛ〕	ei [ei] 〔ei〕	eu [ɛːu] 〔ɛu〕	em [ɛːm] 〔ɛm〕		eng [ɛːŋ] 〔ɛŋ〕	ep [ɛːp] 〔ɛp〕		ek [ɛːk] 〔ɛk〕
i [iː] 〔i〕		iu [iːu] 〔iu〕	im [iːm] 〔im〕	in [iːn] 〔in〕	ing [eŋ] 〔iŋ〕	ip [iːp] 〔ip〕	it [iːt] 〔it〕	ik [ek] 〔ik〕
o [ɔː] 〔ɔ〕	oi [ɔːy] 〔ɔi〕	ou [ou] 〔ou〕		on [ɔːn] 〔ɔn〕	ong [ɔːŋ] 〔ɔŋ〕		ot [ɔːt] 〔ɔt〕	ok [ɔːk] 〔ɔk〕
u [uː] 〔u〕	ui [uːy] 〔ui〕			un [uːn] 〔un〕	ung [oŋ] 〔uŋ〕		ut [uːt] 〔ut〕	uk [ok] 〔uk〕
oe [œː] 〔œ〕	oey [ɵy] 〔œy〕			oen [ɵn] 〔œn〕	oeng [œːŋ] 〔œŋ〕		oet [ɵt] 〔œt〕	oek [œːk] 〔œk〕
y [yː] 〔y〕				yn [yːn] 〔yn〕			yt [yːt] 〔yt〕	
			m [m̩] 〔m̩〕		ng [ŋ̍] 〔ŋ̍〕			

- The finals m and ng can only be used as standalone nasal syllables.

== Tones ==
The system recognises nine tones in six distinct tone contours.

Tone name	Jam1 Ping4 (陰平)	Jam1 Soeng6 (陰上)	Jam1 Hoey3 (陰去)	Joeng4 Ping4 (陽平)	Joeng4 Soeng6 (陽上)	Joeng4 Hoey3 (陽去)	Jam1 Jap6 (陰入)	Dzong1 Jap6 (中入)	Joeng4 Jap6 (陽入)
Tone Number	1	2	3	4	5	6	7 (1)	8 (3)	9 (6)
Tone name according to Middle Chinese System	Dark Level	Dark Rising	Dark Departing	Light Level	Light Rising	Light Departing	Dark Entering	Middle Entering	Light Entering
Tone name according to contour	high level or high falling	mid rising	mid level	low falling	low rising	low level	entering high level	entering mid level	entering low level
Contour	55 / 53	35	33	21 / 11	13	22	5	3	2
Character Example	分	粉	訓	焚	奮	份	忽	發	佛
Example	fan1	fan2	fan3	fan4	fan5	fan6	fat7 (fat1)	faat8 (faat3)	fat9 (fat6)

== Comparison with Yale romanization ==
ILE and the Yale romanization system represent Cantonese pronunciations with these same letters:

- The initials: b, p, m, f, d, t, n, l, g, k, ng, h, s, gw, kw, w.
- The vowels: aa (except when used alone), a, e, i, o, u.
- The nasal stops: m, ng.
- The codas: i (except for being the coda [y] in Yale), u, m, n, ng, p, t, k.

But they have these differences:

- The vowels oe represent [ɵ] and [œː] in ILE while the eu represents both vowels in Yale.
- The vowel y represents [y] in ILE while both yu (used in nucleus) and i (used in coda) are used in Yale.
- The initial j represents [j] in ILE while y is used instead in Yale.
- The initial dz represents [ts] in ILE while j is used instead in Yale.
- The initial ts represents [tsʰ] in ILE while ch is used instead in Yale.
- In ILE, if no consonant precedes the vowel y, then the initial j is appended before the vowel. In Yale, the corresponding initial y is never appended before yu under any circumstances.
- Some new finals can be written in ILE that are not contained in Yale romanization schemes, such as: eu [ɛːu], em [ɛːm], and ep [ɛːp]. These three finals are used in colloquial Cantonese words, such as deu6 (掉), lem2 (舐), and gep9 (夾).
- To represent tones, only tone numbers are used in ILE while Yale originally used tone marks together with the letter h (though tone numbers can be used in Yale as well).

== Comparison with Jyutping ==
ILE and Jyutping represent Cantonese pronunciations with these same letters:

- The initials: b, p, m, f, d, t, n, l, g, k, ng, h, s, gw, kw, j, w.
- The vowels: aa, a, e, i, o, u.
- The nasal stops: m, ng.
- The codas: i (except for being the coda [y] in Jyutping), u, m, n, ng, p, t, k.

But they have these differences:

- The vowels oe represent [ɵ] and [œː] in ILE while eo and oe represent [ɵ] and [œː] respectively in Jyutping.
- The vowel y represents [y] in ILE while both yu (used in nucleus) and i (used in coda) are used in Jyutping.
- The initial dz represents [ts] in ILE while z is used instead in Jyutping.
- The initial ts represents [tsʰ] in ILE while c is used instead in Jyutping.
- To represent tones, numbers 1 to 9 are usually used in ILE, although to use 1, 3, 6 to replace 7, 8, 9 is acceptable. However, only numbers 1 to 6 are used in Jyutping.

== Examples ==
Traditional	Simplified	Romanization
廣東話	广东话	gwong2 dung1 waa2
粵語	粤语	jyt9 jy5
你好	你好	nei5 hou2

Sample transcription of one of the 300 Tang Poems by Meng Haoran:

春曉 孟浩然	Tsoen1 Hiu2; Maang6 Hou6jin4	Chunxiao; Meng Haoran
春眠不覺曉，	Tsoen1 min4 bat7 gok8 hiu2,	Sleeping past sunrise in springtime.
處處聞啼鳥。	Tsy3 tsy3 man4 tai4 niu5.	Everywhere one hears birdsong.
夜來風雨聲，	Je6 loi4 fung1 jy5 sing1,	Night brings the sound of wind and rain,
花落知多少？	faa1 lok9 dzi1 do1 siu2?	I wonder how many flowers fell?
