= Cantonese (disambiguation) =

Cantonese is a language originating in Canton, Guangdong.

Cantonese may also refer to:

- Yue Chinese, Chinese languages that include Cantonese
- Cantonese cuisine, the cuisine of Guangdong Province
- Cantonese people, the native people of Guangdong and Guangxi
- Cantonese culture, the culture of the Lingnan region that includes Guangdong and Guangxi

== See also ==
- Cantonese Braille, a Cantonese-language version of Braille in Hong Kong
- Cantopop, Cantonese pop music
