= A Chinese Syllabary Pronounced According to the Dialect of Canton =

1941 book by Wong Shik-Ling

- Traditional Chinese: 粵音韻彙
- Simplified Chinese: 粤音韵汇
Transcriptions
Standard Mandarin
- Hanyu Pinyin: Yuèyīn Yùnhuì
Yue: Cantonese
- Jyutping: Jyut6jam1 Wan6wui6

A Chinese Syllabary Pronounced According to the Dialect of Canton (粵音韻彙) is a book written by Wong Shik-Ling (黃錫凌) within a few years before being published in Hong Kong, 1941. It is one of the most influential books on the research of Cantonese pronunciation. Many Chinese dictionaries later used Wong's Chinese character indices and system of phonetic symbols to denote the Cantonese pronunciation of Chinese characters. Because of its significance, the book has been reprinted many times after its first publishing.

== Content ==
- Indices of Rime syllabus (finals) of the rime dictionary Guangyun (廣韻)
- Radical-stroke count indices
- Categories of Chinese character according to distinct Cantonese pronunciation syllabus. It is first ordered by finals, second by initials, and third by tones alphabetically.
- A research paper on Cantonese phonetics.
- A suggestion scheme of romanisation of Cantonese
- An English research paper on Cantonese phonetics, completed in Lingnan University, Canton, 1938.

Some characters with multiple pronunciation are commented with meaning, short notes, or usage in each category.

== See also ==
- S. L. Wong (phonetic symbols)
- S. L. Wong (romanisation)
