= S. L. Wong (romanisation) =

Romanisation system for Cantonese

Wong Shik-Ling (also known as S. L. Wong) published a romanisation scheme accompanying a set of phonetic symbols for Cantonese based on International Phonetic Alphabet (IPA) in the book A Chinese Syllabary Pronounced according to the Dialect of Canton.

== Phonology ==
Cantonese, like a number of other varieties of Chinese is monosyllabic. Each syllable is divided into initial (consonant), final (vowel and following consonant) and tone.

=== Finals ===
Chinese phonology traditionally stresses on finals because it is related to rhymes in the composition of poems, proses and articles. There are 53 finals in Cantonese.

==== Vowels ====
The ten basic vowel phoneme symbols [a], [ɐ], [ei], [ɛ], [i], [ou], [ɔ], [œ], [u] and [y] in the scheme mean following:

International phonetic alphabet	[a]	[ɐ]	[eː]	[ɛ]	[i]	[oː]	[ɔ]	[œ]	[u]	[y]
S. L. Wong (phonetic symbol)	[a]	[ɐ]	[ei]	[ɛ]	[i]	[ou]	[ɔ]	[œ]	[u]	[y]
S. L. Wong (romanisation)	aa	a	ei	e	i	ou	o	eu	u	ue

For detail explanation of the phonetic system, see S. L. Wong (phonetic symbols)#Vowels.

==== Falling diphthong finals ====
All vowel phonemes except a formed vowel 9 finals themselves.

Some vowel phonemes can followed by vowel phonemes -i, -u or -ue to form 8 falling diphthong finals:

	aa	a	ei	e	i	ou	o	eu	u	ue
-	aa		ei	e	i	ou	o	eu	u	ue
-i	aai	ai					oi		ui	
-u	aau	au			iu					
-ue								eue		

1. The combination of eu and ue is euue. The double u is reduced to a single u and the combination becomes eue.

For detail explanation of the phonetic system, see S. L. Wong (phonetic symbols)#Falling diphthong finals.

==== Nasal phoneme finals ====
The nasal consonants [m], [n] and [ŋ] in finals can be written as:

International phonetic alphabet	[m]	[n]	[ŋ]
S. L. Wong (phonetic symbol)	[m]	[n]	[ŋ]
S. L. Wong (romanisation)	m	n	ng

Some vowel phonemes can followed by nasal consonants -m, -n or -ng to form 17 nasal phoneme finals:

	aa	a	ei	e	i	ou	o	eu	u	ue
-m	aam	am			im					
-n	aan	an			in		on	eun	un	uen
-ng	aang	ang		eng	ing		ong	eung	ung	

For detail explanation of the phonetic system, see S. L. Wong (phonetic symbols)#Nasal phoneme finals.

==== Plosive phoneme finals ====
The plosive final can be written [p], [t] and [k] as:

International phonetic alphabet	[p]	[t]	[k]
S. L. Wong (phonetic symbol)	[p]	[t]	[k]
S. L. Wong (romanisation)	p	t	k

Some vowel phonemes can followed by unaspirated plosive consonants -p, -t or -k to form 17 plosive phoneme finals:

	aa	a	ei	e	i	ou	o	eu	u	ue
-p	aap	ap			ip					
-t	aat	at			it		ot	eut	ut	uet
-k	aak	ak		ek	ik		ok	euk	uk	

For detail explanation of the phonetic system, see S. L. Wong (phonetic symbols)#Plosive phoneme finals.

==== Nasal consonantoids fully voiced finals ====
For the nasal consonantoids fully voiced finals

[m] and [ŋ] in voiced form [m̩] and [ŋ̍] are also two finals in Cantonese.

International phonetic alphabet	[m̩]	[ŋ̍]
S. L. Wong (phonetic symbol)	[m̩]	[ŋ̍]
S. L. Wong (romanisation)	m	ng

For detail explanation of the phonetic system, see S. L. Wong (phonetic symbols)#Nasal consonantoids fully voiced finals.

=== Initials ===
Initials are made up of consonants. Most of characters are preceding finals with initials while some characters are pronounced without initials. There are 19 initials in total.

International phonetic alphabet	[m]	[n]	[ŋ̍]	[p]	[t]	[k]	[kʷ]	[pʰ]	[tʰ]	[kʰ]	[kʷʰ]	[ts]	[tsʰ]	[f]	[s]	[h]	[j]	[w]	[l]
S. L. Wong (phonetic symbol)	[m]	[n]	[ŋ̍]	[b]	[d]	[g]	[gw]	[p]	[t]	[k]	[kw]	[dz]	[ts]	[f]	[s]	[h]	[j]	[w]	[l]
S. L. Wong (romanisation)	m	n	ng	b	d	g	gw	p	t	k	kw	dz	ts	f	s	h	y	w	l

For detail explanation of the phonetic system, see S. L. Wong (phonetic symbols)#Initials.

=== Tones ===
Cantonese has six tone contours. Historically, finals that end in a stop consonant were considered as "checked tones" (entering tone) and treated separately by diachronic convention, identifying Cantonese with nine tones (九声六调). However, these are seldom counted as phonemic tones in modern linguistics, which prefer to analyse them as conditioned by the following consonant.

S.L. Wong romanisation uses two ways to mark tones: by marks and by number. The entering tones are considered allotones by marks, but separate by number. Many typewriters have difficulty typing tones, so marks are often used only for reference.

	level	rising	going	entering	
upper	ˈx (1)			ˈx (7)	upper
upper		ˊx (2)	ˉx (3)	ˉx (8)	middle
lower		ˏx (5)	ˍx (6)	ˍx (9)	lower
lower	ˌx (4)				lower

For detail explanation of the phonetic system, see S. L. Wong (phonetic symbols)#Tones.

== See also ==
- S. L. Wong (phonetic symbols)

== Sources ==
- Bauer, Robert S.; Benedict, Paul K. (1997), Modern Cantonese Phonology, Walter de Gruyter, ISBN 978-3-11-014893-0
