= Braille pattern dots-245 =

Braille pattern

6-dot braille cells
⠀	⠁	⠃	⠉	⠙	⠑	⠋	⠛	⠓	⠊	⠚	⠈	⠘
⠄	⠅	⠇	⠍	⠝	⠕	⠏	⠟	⠗	⠎	⠞	⠌	⠜
⠤	⠥	⠧	⠭	⠽	⠵	⠯	⠿	⠷	⠮	⠾	⠬	⠼
⠠	⠡	⠣	⠩	⠹	⠱	⠫	⠻	⠳	⠪	⠺	⠨	⠸
shift down	⠂	⠆	⠒	⠲	⠢	⠖	⠶	⠦	⠔	⠴	⠐	⠰

The Braille pattern dots-245 ( ⠚ ) is a 6-dot braille cell with the top right and both middle dots raised, or an 8-dot braille cell with the top right and both upper-middle dots raised. It is represented by the Unicode code point U+281a, and in Braille ASCII with J.

Character information
Preview	⠚ (braille pattern dots-245)	
Unicode name	BRAILLE PATTERN DOTS-245	
Encodings	decimal	hex
Unicode	10266	U+281A
UTF-8	226 160 154	E2 A0 9A
Numeric character reference	&#10266;	&#x281A;
Braille ASCII	74	4A

== Unified Braille ==
In unified international braille, the braille pattern dots-245 is used to represent a voiced palatal affricate, fricative, or approximant, such as /dʑ/, /ʑ/ or /j/, and is otherwise assigned as needed. It is also used for the number 0.

=== Table of unified braille values ===
French Braille	J, "je"
English Braille	J
English Contraction	just
German Braille	J
Bharati Braille	ज / ਜ / જ / জ / ଜ / జ / ಜ / ജ / ஜ / ජ / ج
Icelandic Braille	J
IPA Braille	/j/
Russian Braille	Ж
Slovak Braille	J
Arabic Braille	ج
Persian Braille	ج
Irish Braille	J
Thai Braille	จ c
Luxembourgish Braille	j (minuscule)

== Other braille ==
Japanese Braille	ro / ろ / ロ
Korean Braille	h- / ㅎ
Mainland Chinese Braille	r-
Taiwanese Braille	c-,q- / ㄘ,ㄑ
Two-Cell Chinese Braille	bi- -à
Nemeth Braille	not an independent sign
Algerian Braille	ر

== Plus dots 7 and 8 ==
Related to Braille pattern dots-245 are Braille patterns 2457, 2458, and 24578, which are used in 8-dot braille systems, such as Gardner-Salinas and Luxembourgish Braille.

Character information
Preview	⡚ (braille pattern dots-2457)		⢚ (braille pattern dots-2458)		⣚ (braille pattern dots-24578)	
Unicode name	BRAILLE PATTERN DOTS-2457		BRAILLE PATTERN DOTS-2458		BRAILLE PATTERN DOTS-24578	
Encodings	decimal	hex	dec	hex	dec	hex
Unicode	10330	U+285A	10394	U+289A	10458	U+28DA
UTF-8	226 161 154	E2 A1 9A	226 162 154	E2 A2 9A	226 163 154	E2 A3 9A
Numeric character reference	&#10330;	&#x285A;	&#10394;	&#x289A;	&#10458;	&#x28DA;

	dots 2457	dots 2458	dots 24578
Gardner Salinas Braille	J (capital)	○ (function composition)	
Luxembourgish Braille	J (capital)		

== Related 8-dot kantenji patterns ==
In the Japanese kantenji braille, the standard 8-dot Braille patterns 356, 1356, 3456, and 13456 are the patterns related to Braille pattern dots-245, since the two additional dots of kantenji patterns 0245, 2457, and 02457 are placed above the base 6-dot cell, instead of below, as in standard 8-dot braille.

Character information
Preview	⠴ (braille pattern dots-356)		⠵ (braille pattern dots-1356)		⠼ (braille pattern dots-3456)		⠽ (braille pattern dots-13456)	
Unicode name	BRAILLE PATTERN DOTS-356		BRAILLE PATTERN DOTS-1356		BRAILLE PATTERN DOTS-3456		BRAILLE PATTERN DOTS-13456	
Encodings	decimal	hex	dec	hex	dec	hex	dec	hex
Unicode	10292	U+2834	10293	U+2835	10300	U+283C	10301	U+283D
UTF-8	226 160 180	E2 A0 B4	226 160 181	E2 A0 B5	226 160 188	E2 A0 BC	226 160 189	E2 A0 BD
Numeric character reference	&#10292;	&#x2834;	&#10293;	&#x2835;	&#10300;	&#x283C;	&#10301;	&#x283D;

=== Kantenji using braille patterns 356, 1356, 3456, or 13456 ===
This listing includes kantenji using Braille pattern dots-245 for all 6349 kanji found in JIS C 6226-1978.

- - 十

==== Variants and thematic compounds ====
- - ろ/十 + selector 2 = 鹵
- - ろ/十 + selector 4 = 才
- - selector 4 + ろ/十 = 辰

==== Compounds of 十 ====
- - れ/口 + ろ/十 = 古
  - - 囗 + ろ/十 = 固
    - - 氷/氵 + 囗 + ろ/十 = 凅
    - - に/氵 + 囗 + ろ/十 = 涸
    - - や/疒 + 囗 + ろ/十 = 痼
    - - か/金 + 囗 + ろ/十 = 錮
  - - き/木 + ろ/十 = 枯
  - - く/艹 + ろ/十 = 苦
  - - ろ/十 + 宿 = 克
    - - ろ/十 + れ/口 + 宿 = 兢
    - - ろ/十 + 比 + し/巿 = 尅
    - - ろ/十 + 宿 + ぬ/力 = 剋
  - - な/亻 + れ/口 + ろ/十 = 估
  - - ふ/女 + れ/口 + ろ/十 = 姑
  - - る/忄 + れ/口 + ろ/十 = 怙
  - - に/氵 + れ/口 + ろ/十 = 沽
  - - す/発 + れ/口 + ろ/十 = 罟
  - - 心 + れ/口 + ろ/十 = 葫
  - - せ/食 + れ/口 + ろ/十 = 醐
  - - む/車 + れ/口 + ろ/十 = 蛄
  - - え/訁 + れ/口 + ろ/十 = 詁
  - - ろ/十 + れ/口 + ろ/十 = 辜
  - - か/金 + れ/口 + ろ/十 = 鈷
- - お/頁 + ろ/十 = 卒
  - - 龸 + ろ/十 = 率
    - - む/車 + 龸 + ろ/十 = 蟀
  - - な/亻 + お/頁 + ろ/十 = 倅
  - - つ/土 + お/頁 + ろ/十 = 埣
  - - る/忄 + お/頁 + ろ/十 = 悴
  - - に/氵 + お/頁 + ろ/十 = 淬
  - - け/犬 + お/頁 + ろ/十 = 猝
  - - や/疒 + お/頁 + ろ/十 = 瘁
  - - む/車 + お/頁 + ろ/十 = 翠
  - - く/艹 + お/頁 + ろ/十 = 萃
  - - の/禾 + の/禾 + ろ/十 = 粹
  - - せ/食 + せ/食 + ろ/十 = 醉
- - 日 + ろ/十 = 早
  - - ま/石 + ろ/十 = 章
    - - さ/阝 + ろ/十 = 障
    - - 心 + ま/石 + ろ/十 = 樟
    - - へ/⺩ + ま/石 + ろ/十 = 璋
    - - や/疒 + ま/石 + ろ/十 = 瘴
    - - せ/食 + ま/石 + ろ/十 = 鱆
  - - ろ/十 + を/貝 = 乾
  - - ろ/十 + か/金 = 幹
    - - に/氵 + ろ/十 + か/金 = 澣
  - - ろ/十 + と/戸 = 斡
  - - ろ/十 + ⺼ = 朝
    - - よ/广 + ろ/十 + ⺼ = 廟
  - - ろ/十 + む/車 = 翰
    - - に/氵 + ろ/十 + む/車 = 瀚
  - - ろ/十 + selector 4 + 囗 = 戟
  - - ろ/十 + 宿 + い/糹/#2 = 韓
  - - 氷/氵 + 日 + ろ/十 = 覃
    - - に/氵 + 日 + ろ/十 = 潭
    - - ち/竹 + 日 + ろ/十 = 簟
    - - 心 + 日 + ろ/十 = 蕈
    - - え/訁 + 日 + ろ/十 = 譚
    - - か/金 + 日 + ろ/十 = 鐔
- - ろ/十 + め/目 = 直
  - - る/忄 + ろ/十 + め/目 = 悳
  - - の/禾 + ろ/十 + め/目 = 稙
- - つ/土 + ろ/十 + め/目 = 埴
- - め/目 + ろ/十 + め/目 = 矗
- - ろ/十 + ゐ/幺 = 索
- - み/耳 + ろ/十 = 聴
  - - み/耳 + み/耳 + ろ/十 = 聽
  - - selector 1 + よ/广 + ろ/十 = 廰
  - - よ/广 + よ/广 + ろ/十 = 廳
- - ゆ/彳 + ろ/十 = 徳
- - ね/示 + ろ/十 = 嚢
- - 氷/氵 + ろ/十 = 準
  - - 氷/氵 + 氷/氵 + ろ/十 = 凖
- - と/戸 + ろ/十 = 革
  - - す/発 + ろ/十 = 羈
  - - 龸 + と/戸 + ろ/十 = 鞏
  - - え/訁 + と/戸 + ろ/十 = 鞫
- - え/訁 + ろ/十 = 計
- - ひ/辶 + ろ/十 = 辻
  - - ひ/辶 + ろ/十 + に/氵 = 逑
- - か/金 + ろ/十 = 針
- - ろ/十 + よ/广 = 世
  - - に/氵 + ろ/十 + よ/广 = 泄
  - - 心 + ろ/十 + よ/广 = 笹
  - - い/糹/#2 + ろ/十 + よ/广 = 紲
- - ろ/十 + ぬ/力 = 協
- - ろ/十 + て/扌 = 博
  - - selector 1 + ろ/十 + て/扌 = 愽
- - ゑ/訁 + ろ/十 = 訊
- - は/辶 + ろ/十 = 迅
  - - 火 + 龸 + ろ/十 = 煢
  - - む/車 + selector 6 + ろ/十 = 蝨
- - お/頁 + お/頁 + ろ/十 = 卆
  - - せ/食 + ろ/十 = 酔
  - - 仁/亻 + お/頁 + ろ/十 = 伜
  - - の/禾 + ろ/十 = 粋
  - - き/木 + 宿 + ろ/十 = 枠
- - ろ/十 + に/氵 = 求
  - - ろ/十 + 氷/氵 = 救
  - - ね/示 + ろ/十 + に/氵 = 裘
  - - 日 + 宿 + ろ/十 = 皐
- - な/亻 + 宿 + ろ/十 = 什
- - れ/口 + 宿 + ろ/十 = 叶
- - け/犬 + 宿 + ろ/十 = 夲
- - こ/子 + 宿 + ろ/十 = 孛
  - - る/忄 + 宿 + ろ/十 = 悖
- - に/氵 + 宿 + ろ/十 = 汁
- - か/金 + う/宀/#3 + ろ/十 = 瓧
- - ま/石 + 宿 + ろ/十 = 竍
- - の/禾 + 宿 + ろ/十 = 籵
- - い/糹/#2 + 宿 + ろ/十 = 隼
- - ろ/十 + 龸 + せ/食 = 鴇
- - ろ/十 + ゑ/訁 = 友
  - - み/耳 + ろ/十 + ゑ/訁 = 跋
  - - し/巿 + ろ/十 + ゑ/訁 = 黻
  - - の/禾 + ろ/十 + ゑ/訁 = 秡
- - ろ/十 + つ/土 = 在
  - - る/忄 + ろ/十 + つ/土 = 恠
- - ろ/十 + こ/子 = 存
  - - て/扌 + ろ/十 + こ/子 = 拵
  - - き/木 + ろ/十 + こ/子 = 栫
  - - く/艹 + ろ/十 + こ/子 = 荐
- - ろ/十 + し/巿 = 布
- - ろ/十 + ら/月 = 有
  - - ろ/十 + さ/阝 = 郁
  - - な/亻 + ろ/十 + ら/月 = 侑
  - - 囗 + ろ/十 + ら/月 = 囿
  - - う/宀/#3 + ろ/十 + ら/月 = 宥
  - - さ/阝 + ろ/十 + ら/月 = 陏
  - - せ/食 + ろ/十 + ら/月 = 鮪
- - 宿 + ろ/十 = 宏
  - - 氷/氵 + 宿 + ろ/十 = 浤
- - い/糹/#2 + ろ/十 = 紘
- - ろ/十 + い/糹/#2 = 雄
- - ⺼ + 宿 + ろ/十 = 肱

==== Compounds of 鹵 ====
- - ん/止 + ろ/十 = 齢
  - - ん/止 + ん/止 + ろ/十 = 齡

==== Compounds of 才 ====
- - そ/馬 + ろ/十 = 豺
- - を/貝 + ろ/十 = 財
- - も/門 + ろ/十 = 閉
- - ろ/十 + き/木 = 材
- - け/犬 + ろ/十 + selector 4 = 犲

==== Compounds of 辰 ====
- - ふ/女 + ろ/十 = 娠
- - て/扌 + ろ/十 = 振
- - た/⽥ + ろ/十 = 農
  - - に/氵 + ろ/十 = 濃
  - - な/亻 + た/⽥ + ろ/十 = 儂
  - - ⺼ + た/⽥ + ろ/十 = 膿
- - し/巿 + ろ/十 = 辱
  - - に/氵 + し/巿 + ろ/十 = 溽
  - - い/糹/#2 + し/巿 + ろ/十 = 縟
  - - こ/子 + し/巿 + ろ/十 = 耨
  - - く/艹 + し/巿 + ろ/十 = 蓐
  - - ね/示 + し/巿 + ろ/十 = 褥
- - ち/竹 + ろ/十 = 震
- - ろ/十 + れ/口 = 唇
- - ろ/十 + ね/示 = 喪
- - ろ/十 + お/頁 = 賑
- - う/宀/#3 + selector 4 + ろ/十 = 宸
- - 日 + selector 4 + ろ/十 = 晨
- - ⺼ + selector 4 + ろ/十 = 脣
- - む/車 + 宿 + ろ/十 = 蜃

==== Other compounds ====
- - ろ/十 + は/辶 = 半
  - - ろ/十 + ん/止 = 叛
  - - て/扌 + ろ/十 + は/辶 = 拌
  - - ⺼ + ろ/十 + は/辶 = 胖
  - - ね/示 + ろ/十 + は/辶 = 袢
- - ろ/十 + ま/石 = 辛
  - - 心 + ろ/十 = 梓
  - - 心 + ろ/十 + ま/石 = 薛
- - よ/广 + ろ/十 = 庁
- - な/亻 + ろ/十 = 僚
- - う/宀/#3 + ろ/十 = 寮
- - 火 + ろ/十 = 燎
- - や/疒 + ろ/十 = 療
- - め/目 + ろ/十 = 瞭
- - て/扌 + 宿 + ろ/十 = 撩
- - 日 + 龸 + ろ/十 = 暸
- - に/氵 + 龸 + ろ/十 = 潦
- - ゐ/幺 + 宿 + ろ/十 = 繚
- - ひ/辶 + 宿 + ろ/十 = 遼
- - か/金 + 宿 + ろ/十 = 鐐
- - ろ/十 + う/宀/#3 + せ/食 = 鷯
- - ぬ/力 + ろ/十 = 勃
  - - に/氵 + ぬ/力 + ろ/十 = 渤
- - 仁/亻 + ろ/十 = 令
  - - へ/⺩ + ろ/十 = 玲
  - - な/亻 + 仁/亻 + ろ/十 = 伶
  - - 囗 + 仁/亻 + ろ/十 = 囹
  - - る/忄 + 仁/亻 + ろ/十 = 怜
  - - そ/馬 + 仁/亻 + ろ/十 = 羚
  - - み/耳 + 仁/亻 + ろ/十 = 聆
  - - 心 + 仁/亻 + ろ/十 = 苓
  - - む/車 + 仁/亻 + ろ/十 = 蛉
  - - ろ/十 + 宿 + せ/食 = 鴒
- - ⺼ + ろ/十 = 肋
- - ら/月 + ろ/十 = 臘
- - む/車 + ろ/十 = 蝋
- - け/犬 + ろ/十 = 猟
  - - け/犬 + け/犬 + ろ/十 = 獵
- - か/金 + 龸 + ろ/十 = 鑞
- - ろ/十 + 囗 = 再
  - - selector 1 + ろ/十 + 囗 = 冉
    - - く/艹 + ろ/十 + 囗 = 苒
- - ろ/十 + そ/馬 = 牽
- - ろ/十 + ひ/辶 = 飛
