= Braille pattern dots-1235 =

Braille pattern

6-dot braille cells
⠀	⠁	⠃	⠉	⠙	⠑	⠋	⠛	⠓	⠊	⠚	⠈	⠘
⠄	⠅	⠇	⠍	⠝	⠕	⠏	⠟	⠗	⠎	⠞	⠌	⠜
⠤	⠥	⠧	⠭	⠽	⠵	⠯	⠿	⠷	⠮	⠾	⠬	⠼
⠠	⠡	⠣	⠩	⠹	⠱	⠫	⠻	⠳	⠪	⠺	⠨	⠸
shift down	⠂	⠆	⠒	⠲	⠢	⠖	⠶	⠦	⠔	⠴	⠐	⠰

The Braille pattern dots-1235 ( ⠗ ) is a 6-dot braille cell with dots raised, or an 8-dot braille cell with raised. It is represented by the Unicode code point U+2817, and in Braille ASCII with an R.

Character information
Preview	⠗ (braille pattern dots-1235)	
Unicode name	BRAILLE PATTERN DOTS-1235	
Encodings	decimal	hex
Unicode	10263	U+2817
UTF-8	226 160 151	E2 A0 97
Numeric character reference	&#10263;	&#x2817;
Braille ASCII	82	52

== Unified Braille ==
In unified international braille, the braille pattern dots-1235 is used to represent coronal or dorsal flaps, trills, or approximant consonants such as /r/, /ɹ/, /ɽ/, or /ʀ/.

=== Table of unified braille values ===
French Braille	R, "rien"
English Braille	R
English Contraction	rather
German Braille	R
Bharati Braille	र / ਰ / ર / র / ৰ / ର / ర / ರ / ര / ர / ර / ر
Icelandic Braille	R
IPA Braille	/r/
Russian Braille	Р
Slovak Braille	R
Arabic Braille	ر
Persian Braille	ر
Irish Braille	R
Thai Braille	ร r
Luxembourgish Braille	r (minuscule)

== Other braille ==
Japanese Braille	chi / ち / チ
Korean Braille	ae / ㅐ
Mainland Chinese Braille	er
Taiwanese Braille	h / ㄏ
Two-Cell Chinese Braille	li- -āo
Algerian Braille	ع

== Plus dots 7 and 8 ==
Related to Braille pattern dots-1235 are Braille patterns 12357, 12358, and 123578, which are used in 8-dot braille systems, such as Gardner-Salinas and Luxembourgish Braille.

Character information
Preview	⡗ (braille pattern dots-12357)		⢗ (braille pattern dots-12358)		⣗ (braille pattern dots-123578)	
Unicode name	BRAILLE PATTERN DOTS-12357		BRAILLE PATTERN DOTS-12358		BRAILLE PATTERN DOTS-123578	
Encodings	decimal	hex	dec	hex	dec	hex
Unicode	10327	U+2857	10391	U+2897	10455	U+28D7
UTF-8	226 161 151	E2 A1 97	226 162 151	E2 A2 97	226 163 151	E2 A3 97
Numeric character reference	&#10327;	&#x2857;	&#10391;	&#x2897;	&#10455;	&#x28D7;

	dots 12357	dots 12358	dots 123578
Gardner Salinas Braille	R (capital)	ρ (rho)	
Luxembourgish Braille	R (capital)		

== Related 8-dot kantenji patterns ==
In the Japanese kantenji braille, the standard 8-dot Braille patterns 2367, 12367, 23467, and 123467 are the patterns related to Braille pattern dots-1235, since the two additional dots of kantenji patterns 01235, 12357, and 012357 are placed above the base 6-dot cell, instead of below, as in standard 8-dot braille.

Character information
Preview	⡦ (braille pattern dots-2367)		⡧ (braille pattern dots-12367)		⡮ (braille pattern dots-23467)		⡯ (braille pattern dots-123467)	
Unicode name	BRAILLE PATTERN DOTS-2367		BRAILLE PATTERN DOTS-12367		BRAILLE PATTERN DOTS-23467		BRAILLE PATTERN DOTS-123467	
Encodings	decimal	hex	dec	hex	dec	hex	dec	hex
Unicode	10342	U+2866	10343	U+2867	10350	U+286E	10351	U+286F
UTF-8	226 161 166	E2 A1 A6	226 161 167	E2 A1 A7	226 161 174	E2 A1 AE	226 161 175	E2 A1 AF
Numeric character reference	&#10342;	&#x2866;	&#10343;	&#x2867;	&#10350;	&#x286E;	&#10351;	&#x286F;

=== Kantenji using braille patterns 2367, 12367, 23467, or 123467 ===
This listing includes kantenji using Braille pattern dots-1235 for all 6349 kanji found in JIS C 6226-1978.

- - 竹

==== Variants and thematic compounds ====
- - selector 4 + ち/竹 = 也
- - selector 6 + ち/竹 = 采
  - - selector 6 + selector 6 + ち/竹 = 釆
- - ち/竹 + selector 1 = 雨
- - ち/竹 + selector 4 = 両
- - 数 + ち/竹 = 父

==== Compounds of 竹 ====
- - た/⽥ + ち/竹 = 笛
- - れ/口 + ち/竹 = 筈
- - と/戸 + ち/竹 = 箸
- - ま/石 + ち/竹 = 篭
- - ち/竹 + か/金 = 竿
- - ち/竹 + け/犬 = 笑
- - ち/竹 + ま/石 = 笠
  - - ち/竹 + ま/石 + 心 = 籠
- - ち/竹 + な/亻 = 符
- - ち/竹 + ゆ/彳 = 第
- - ち/竹 + ふ/女 = 筆
- - ち/竹 + し/巿 = 等
- - ち/竹 + ⺼ = 筋
- - ち/竹 + こ/子 = 筍
- - ち/竹 + く/艹 = 筑
- - ち/竹 + と/戸 = 筒
- - ち/竹 + 囗 = 答
- - ち/竹 + 数 = 策
- - ち/竹 + れ/口 = 箇
- - ち/竹 + ら/月 = 管
- - ち/竹 + め/目 = 箱
- - ち/竹 + さ/阝 = 節
  - - き/木 + ち/竹 + さ/阝 = 櫛
- - ち/竹 + む/車 = 範
- - ち/竹 + 龸 = 築
- - ち/竹 + そ/馬 = 篤
- - ち/竹 + 日 = 簡
- - ち/竹 + て/扌 = 簿
- - ち/竹 + ね/示 = 籍
- - ち/竹 + ゐ/幺 = 纂
- - ち/竹 + ら/月 + ぬ/力 = 箭
  - - て/扌 + 宿 + ち/竹 = 擶
- - ち/竹 + 宿 + い/糹/#2 = 竺
- - ち/竹 + selector 1 + お/頁 = 笂
- - ち/竹 + 宿 + と/戸 = 笄
- - ち/竹 + selector 5 + ひ/辶 = 笆
- - ち/竹 + selector 4 + ゐ/幺 = 笈
- - ち/竹 + ⺼ + つ/土 = 笊
- - ち/竹 + selector 6 + い/糹/#2 = 笋
- - ち/竹 + selector 4 + 数 = 笏
- - ち/竹 + れ/口 + と/戸 = 笘
- - ち/竹 + せ/食 + い/糹/#2 = 笙
- - ち/竹 + selector 4 + な/亻 = 笞
- - ち/竹 + selector 4 + 仁/亻 = 笥
- - ち/竹 + き/木 + selector 6 = 笨
- - ち/竹 + ぬ/力 + れ/口 = 笳
- - ち/竹 + 宿 + さ/阝 = 笵
- - ち/竹 + や/疒 + selector 2 = 笶
- - ち/竹 + つ/土 + 龸 = 筅
- - ち/竹 + り/分 + へ/⺩ = 筌
- - ち/竹 + 宿 + 囗 = 筏
- - ち/竹 + へ/⺩ + selector 1 = 筐
- - ち/竹 + 龸 + そ/馬 = 筝
- - ち/竹 + selector 6 + み/耳 = 筥
- - ち/竹 + め/目 + 宿 = 筧
- - ち/竹 + せ/食 + ひ/辶 = 筬
- - ち/竹 + 仁/亻 + ふ/女 = 筮
- - ち/竹 + 仁/亻 + さ/阝 = 筰
- - ち/竹 + 仁/亻 + ゆ/彳 = 筱
- - ち/竹 + selector 5 + な/亻 = 筴
- - ち/竹 + は/辶 + selector 1 = 筵
- - ち/竹 + 龸 + へ/⺩ = 筺
- - ち/竹 + 宿 + 比 = 箆
- - ち/竹 + selector 4 + 囗 = 箋
- - ち/竹 + 宿 + て/扌 = 箍
- - ち/竹 + そ/馬 + 宿 = 箏
- - ち/竹 + 宿 + り/分 = 箒
- - ち/竹 + 氷/氵 + 日 = 箔
- - ち/竹 + selector 4 + き/木 = 箕
- - ち/竹 + 龸 + 囗 = 箘
- - ち/竹 + ら/月 + ゐ/幺 = 箙
- - ち/竹 + り/分 + 囗 = 箚
- - ち/竹 + う/宀/#3 + き/木 = 箜
- - ち/竹 + selector 4 + る/忄 = 箝
- - ち/竹 + 日 + 比 = 箟
- - ち/竹 + れ/口 + れ/口 = 箪
- - ち/竹 + ひ/辶 + selector 3 = 箴
- - ち/竹 + 日 + へ/⺩ = 篁
- - ち/竹 + 宿 + そ/馬 = 篆
- - ち/竹 + 宿 + へ/⺩ = 篇
- - ち/竹 + 宿 + な/亻 = 篋
- - ち/竹 + 仁/亻 + や/疒 = 篌
- - ち/竹 + ん/止 + selector 1 = 篏
- - ち/竹 + 宿 + む/車 = 篝
- - ち/竹 + 心 + に/氵 = 篥
- - ち/竹 + 龸 + 比 = 篦
- - ち/竹 + し/巿 + ら/月 = 篩
- - ち/竹 + 宿 + た/⽥ = 篳
- - ち/竹 + 宿 + ん/止 = 篶
- - ち/竹 + ひ/辶 + ほ/方 = 篷
- - ち/竹 + へ/⺩ + を/貝 = 簀
- - ち/竹 + ほ/方 + や/疒 = 簇
- - ち/竹 + 宿 + る/忄 = 簍
- - ち/竹 + 宿 + ね/示 = 簑
- - ち/竹 + selector 2 + む/車 = 簒
- - ち/竹 + 囗 + う/宀/#3 = 簓
- - ち/竹 + 龸 + ね/示 = 簔
- - ち/竹 + 宿 + き/木 = 簗
- - ち/竹 + 日 + ろ/十 = 簟
- - ち/竹 + を/貝 + き/木 = 簣
- - ち/竹 + し/巿 + こ/子 = 簧
- - ち/竹 + 宿 + 日 = 簪
- - ち/竹 + ぬ/力 + ゆ/彳 = 簫
- - ち/竹 + 龸 + 日 = 簷
- - ち/竹 + selector 4 + ひ/辶 = 簸
- - ち/竹 + selector 6 + り/分 = 簽
- - ち/竹 + よ/广 + け/犬 = 簾
- - ち/竹 + 龸 + ら/月 = 籀
- - ち/竹 + す/発 + ⺼ = 籃
- - ち/竹 + へ/⺩ + し/巿 = 籌
- - ち/竹 + ほ/方 + き/木 = 籏
- - ち/竹 + 宿 + 数 = 籔
- - ち/竹 + 龸 + み/耳 = 籖
- - ち/竹 + 宿 + ふ/女 = 籘
- - ち/竹 + お/頁 + 数 = 籟
- - ち/竹 + 宿 + み/耳 = 籤
- - ち/竹 + た/⽥ + ち/竹 = 籥
- - ち/竹 + う/宀/#3 + い/糹/#2 = 籬

==== Compounds of 也 ====
- - な/亻 + ち/竹 = 他
- - つ/土 + ち/竹 = 地
- - ゆ/彳 + ち/竹 = 弛
- - に/氵 + ち/竹 = 池
- - ほ/方 + ち/竹 = 施
  - - 心 + ほ/方 + ち/竹 = 葹
- - そ/馬 + ち/竹 = 馳
- - か/金 + selector 4 + ち/竹 = 釶
- - と/戸 + selector 4 + ち/竹 = 髢

==== Compounds of 采 and 釆 ====
- - て/扌 + ち/竹 = 採
- - く/艹 + ち/竹 = 菜
- - ち/竹 + う/宀/#3 = 彩
- - ち/竹 + 宿 + 心 = 悉
- - い/糹/#2 + 宿 + ち/竹 = 綵

==== Compounds of 雨 ====
- - ち/竹 + え/訁 = 雲
  - - 日 + ち/竹 = 曇
    - - つ/土 + 日 + ち/竹 = 壜
    - - ん/止 + 日 + ち/竹 = 罎
  - - い/糹/#2 + ち/竹 + え/訁 = 繧
- - 氷/氵 + ち/竹 = 漏
- - ち/竹 + せ/食 = 雪
  - - ⺼ + ち/竹 + せ/食 = 膤
  - - ふ/女 + ち/竹 + せ/食 = 艝
  - - む/車 + ち/竹 + せ/食 = 轌
  - - せ/食 + ち/竹 + せ/食 = 鱈
- - ち/竹 + り/分 = 雰
- - ち/竹 + ん/止 = 零
  - - に/氵 + ち/竹 + ん/止 = 澪
- - ち/竹 + た/⽥ = 雷
  - - て/扌 + ち/竹 + た/⽥ = 擂
  - - く/艹 + ち/竹 + た/⽥ = 蕾
- - ち/竹 + も/門 = 雹
- - ち/竹 + 心 = 電
- - ち/竹 + の/禾 = 需
  - - ふ/女 + ち/竹 + の/禾 = 嬬
  - - こ/子 + ち/竹 + の/禾 = 孺
  - - る/忄 + ち/竹 + の/禾 = 懦
  - - の/禾 + ち/竹 + の/禾 = 糯
  - - い/糹/#2 + ち/竹 + の/禾 = 繻
  - - ⺼ + ち/竹 + の/禾 = 臑
  - - む/車 + ち/竹 + の/禾 = 蠕
  - - ね/示 + ち/竹 + の/禾 = 襦
- - ち/竹 + ろ/十 = 震
- - ち/竹 + 仁/亻 = 霊
  - - ち/竹 + ち/竹 + 仁/亻 = 靈
- - ち/竹 + き/木 = 霜
  - - ふ/女 + ち/竹 + き/木 = 孀
- - ち/竹 + よ/广 = 霧
- - ち/竹 + 氷/氵 = 霰
- - ち/竹 + み/耳 = 露
- - 心 + ち/竹 + selector 1 = 樗
- - き/木 + ち/竹 + selector 1 = 櫺
- - や/疒 + ち/竹 + selector 1 = 癨
- - む/車 + 宿 + ち/竹 = 轜
- - ち/竹 + 比 + 龸 = 雫
- - ち/竹 + そ/馬 + ⺼ = 霄
- - ち/竹 + は/辶 + へ/⺩ = 霆
- - ち/竹 + 宿 + し/巿 = 霈
- - ち/竹 + selector 4 + い/糹/#2 = 霍
- - ち/竹 + ふ/女 + ま/石 = 霎
- - ち/竹 + selector 4 + 火 = 霏
- - ち/竹 + 宿 + に/氵 = 霑
- - ち/竹 + こ/子 + 宿 = 霓
- - ち/竹 + き/木 + き/木 = 霖
- - ち/竹 + く/艹 + お/頁 = 霙
- - ち/竹 + 宿 + の/禾 = 霞
- - ち/竹 + 氷/氵 + に/氵 = 霪
- - ち/竹 + 宿 + ら/月 = 霸
- - ち/竹 + 宿 + ま/石 = 霹
- - ち/竹 + さ/阝 + 龸 = 霽
- - ち/竹 + 比 + り/分 = 霾
- - ち/竹 + こ/子 + ん/止 = 靂
- - ち/竹 + 宿 + 氷/氵 = 靄
- - ち/竹 + ひ/辶 + ゆ/彳 = 靆
- - ち/竹 + 龸 + selector 1 = 靉

==== Compounds of 両 ====
- - む/車 + う/宀/#3 + ち/竹 = 輌
- - ち/竹 + ち/竹 + selector 4 = 兩
  - - な/亻 + ち/竹 + selector 4 = 倆
  - - ね/示 + ち/竹 + selector 4 = 裲
  - - む/車 + ち/竹 + selector 4 = 輛
  - - お/頁 + ち/竹 + selector 4 = 魎

==== Compounds of 父 ====
- - め/目 + 龸 + ち/竹 = 爻
- - 龸 + ち/竹 = 交
  - - き/木 + ち/竹 = 校
  - - い/糹/#2 + ち/竹 = 絞
    - - い/糹/#2 + 龸 + ち/竹 = 纐
  - - む/車 + ち/竹 = 較
  - - さ/阝 + ち/竹 = 郊
  - - ち/竹 + ぬ/力 = 効
  - - な/亻 + 龸 + ち/竹 = 佼
  - - れ/口 + 龸 + ち/竹 = 咬
  - - け/犬 + 龸 + ち/竹 = 狡
  - - 日 + 龸 + ち/竹 = 皎
  - - む/車 + 龸 + ち/竹 = 蛟
  - - そ/馬 + 龸 + ち/竹 = 駮
  - - せ/食 + 龸 + ち/竹 = 鮫
  - - せ/食 + 宿 + ち/竹 = 餃
  - - ち/竹 + ち/竹 + ぬ/力 = 效
  - - ち/竹 + 宿 + せ/食 = 鵁
- - か/金 + ち/竹 = 釜
- - ち/竹 + お/頁 = 斧
- - ち/竹 + や/疒 = 爺
- - か/金 + 宿 + ち/竹 = 釡

==== Other compounds ====
- - や/疒 + ち/竹 = 墾
- - ち/竹 + を/貝 = 乳
- - る/忄 + ち/竹 = 悩
  - - る/忄 + る/忄 + ち/竹 = 惱
- - ⺼ + ち/竹 = 脳
  - - ⺼ + ⺼ + ち/竹 = 腦
- - へ/⺩ + 宿 + ち/竹 = 瑙
- - ま/石 + 宿 + ち/竹 = 碯
