= Wong Shik Ling =

Chinese linguist (1908–1959)

Wong Shik-Ling
- Traditional Chinese: 黃錫凌
- Simplified Chinese: 黄锡凌
Transcriptions
Standard Mandarin
- Hanyu Pinyin: Huáng Xílíng
Yue: Cantonese
- Jyutping: wong4 sek3 ling4

Wong Shik-Ling (also known as S. L. Wong) (1908–1959) was a prominent scholar in Cantonese research. He is famous for his authoritative book, A Chinese Syllabary Pronounced According to the Dialect of Canton (粵音韻彙), which is influential in Cantonese research.

He graduated from Lingnan University, Guangzhou and then taught and researched Cantonese in the university. In 1941 he published his work, "A Chinese Syllabary Pronounced according to the Dialect of Canton". In 1949, he went to the University of London and studied methods for linguistic research in the School of Oriental and African Studies. In 1950, he returned to Hong Kong upon being hired as a lecturer in Cantonese at the University of Hong Kong for 1951. In the same year, he became the first dean in the newly founded Language School and went on to teach foreigners Cantonese for 9 years, until the end of his life. He wrote two textbooks on Cantonese for the university: Cantonese Conversation Grammar (1963) and Intermediate Cantonese Conversation (1967). Both were published by the Government Printer of the Hong Kong Government.

== See also ==
- A Chinese Syllabary Pronounced According to the Dialect of Canton
- S. L. Wong (phonetic symbols)
- S. L. Wong (romanisation)
