= Braille pattern dots-3 =

Braille pattern

6-dot braille cells
⠀	⠁	⠃	⠉	⠙	⠑	⠋	⠛	⠓	⠊	⠚	⠈	⠘
⠄	⠅	⠇	⠍	⠝	⠕	⠏	⠟	⠗	⠎	⠞	⠌	⠜
⠤	⠥	⠧	⠭	⠽	⠵	⠯	⠿	⠷	⠮	⠾	⠬	⠼
⠠	⠡	⠣	⠩	⠹	⠱	⠫	⠻	⠳	⠪	⠺	⠨	⠸
shift down	⠂	⠆	⠒	⠲	⠢	⠖	⠶	⠦	⠔	⠴	⠐	⠰

The Braille pattern dots-3 ( ⠄ ) is a 6-dot braille cell with the bottom left dot raised, or an 8-dot braille cell with the middle-bottom left dot raised. It is represented by the Unicode code point U+2804, and in Braille ASCII with an apostrophe.

Character information
Preview	⠄ (braille pattern dots-3)	
Unicode name	BRAILLE PATTERN DOTS-3	
Encodings	decimal	hex
Unicode	10244	U+2804
UTF-8	226 160 132	E2 A0 84
Numeric character reference	&#10244;	&#x2804;
Braille ASCII	39	27

== Unified Braille ==
In unified international braille, the braille pattern dots-3 is used to represent an apostrophe, accent mark, or other punctuation.

=== Table of unified braille values ===
Italian Braille	' (apostrophe)
French Braille	' (apostrophe), re-, "la"
English Braille	' (apostrophe)
German Braille	. (period)
Bharati Braille	Chandrabindu
Icelandic Braille	. (period)
IPA Braille	. (period)
Slovak Braille	' (apostrophe)
Arabic Braille	ء Hamza
Thai Braille	็ (mai taikhu)

== Other braille ==
Japanese Braille	wa / わ / ワ
Korean Braille	-s / ㅅ
Mainland Chinese Braille	tone 3
Taiwanese Braille	tone 1
Nemeth Braille	' (apostrophe)
Gardner Salinas Braille	' (close single quote)

== Plus dots 7 and 8 ==
Related to Braille pattern dots-3 are Braille patterns 37, 38, and 378, which are used in 8-dot braille systems, such as Gardner-Salinas and Luxembourgish Braille.

Character information
Preview	⡄ (braille pattern dots-37)		⢄ (braille pattern dots-38)		⣄ (braille pattern dots-378)	
Unicode name	BRAILLE PATTERN DOTS-37		BRAILLE PATTERN DOTS-38		BRAILLE PATTERN DOTS-378	
Encodings	decimal	hex	dec	hex	dec	hex
Unicode	10308	U+2844	10372	U+2884	10436	U+28C4
UTF-8	226 161 132	E2 A1 84	226 162 132	E2 A2 84	226 163 132	E2 A3 84
Numeric character reference	&#10308;	&#x2844;	&#10372;	&#x2884;	&#10436;	&#x28C4;

	dots 37	dots 38	dots 378
Gardner Salinas Braille	begin misc. symbol	begin array	` (open single quote)

== Related 8-dot kantenji patterns ==
In the Japanese kantenji braille, the standard 8-dot Braille patterns 7, 17, 47, and 147 are the patterns related to Braille pattern dots-3, since the two additional dots of kantenji patterns 03, 37, and 037 are placed above the base 6-dot cell, instead of below, as in standard 8-dot braille.

Character information
Preview	⡀ (braille pattern dots-7)		⡁ (braille pattern dots-17)		⡈ (braille pattern dots-47)		⡉ (braille pattern dots-147)	
Unicode name	BRAILLE PATTERN DOTS-7		BRAILLE PATTERN DOTS-17		BRAILLE PATTERN DOTS-47		BRAILLE PATTERN DOTS-147	
Encodings	decimal	hex	dec	hex	dec	hex	dec	hex
Unicode	10304	U+2840	10305	U+2841	10312	U+2848	10313	U+2849
UTF-8	226 161 128	E2 A1 80	226 161 129	E2 A1 81	226 161 136	E2 A1 88	226 161 137	E2 A1 89
Numeric character reference	&#10304;	&#x2840;	&#10305;	&#x2841;	&#10312;	&#x2848;	&#10313;	&#x2849;

=== Kantenji using braille patterns 7, 17, 47, or 147 ===
This listing includes kantenji using Braille pattern dots-3 for all 6349 kanji found in JIS C 6226-1978.

- - N/A - used only as a selector

==== Selector ====
- - へ/⺩ + selector 3 = 主
- - 宿 + selector 3 = 冖
- - 氷/氵 + selector 3 = 冫
- - も/門 + selector 3 = 区
  - - み/耳 + も/門 + selector 3 = 躯
  - - も/門 + selector 3 + selector 3 = 匚
  - - も/門 + も/門 + selector 3 = 區
    - - 仁/亻 + も/門 + selector 3 = 傴
    - - け/犬 + も/門 + selector 3 = 奩
    - - ふ/女 + も/門 + selector 3 = 嫗
    - - や/疒 + も/門 + selector 3 = 嶇
- - ひ/辶 + selector 3 = 咸
  - - れ/口 + ひ/辶 + selector 3 = 喊
  - - ち/竹 + ひ/辶 + selector 3 = 箴
  - - い/糹/#2 + ひ/辶 + selector 3 = 緘
  - - か/金 + ひ/辶 + selector 3 = 鍼
  - - せ/食 + ひ/辶 + selector 3 = 鰔
  - - ん/止 + ひ/辶 + selector 3 = 鹹
- - し/巿 + selector 3 = 巾
  - - し/巿 + selector 3 + selector 3 = 黹
- - ゐ + selector 3 = 幺
- - よ + selector 3 = 广
- - ゆ + selector 3 = 彳
- - 龸 + selector 3 = 文
  - - れ/口 + 龸 + selector 3 = 吝
  - - こ/子 + 龸 + selector 3 = 斈
  - - 日 + 龸 + selector 3 = 旻
  - - い/糹/#2 + 龸 + selector 3 = 紊
  - - す/発 + 龸 + selector 3 = 虔
  - - も/門 + 龸 + selector 3 = 閔
  - - そ/馬 + 龸 + selector 3 = 馼
- - に/氵 + selector 3 = 泡
  - - く/艹 + に/氵 + selector 3 = 萢
- - 囗 + selector 3 = 用
  - - む/車 + 囗 + selector 3 = 蛹
- - の + selector 3 = 禾
- - 心 + selector 3 = 粟
- - こ/子 + selector 3 = 耒
- - す/発 + selector 3 = 虎
  - - す/発 + selector 3 + selector 3 = 虍
  - - う/宀/#3 + す/発 + selector 3 = 彪
  - - へ/⺩ + す/発 + selector 3 = 琥
  - - ね/示 + す/発 + selector 3 = 褫
  - - せ/食 + す/発 + selector 3 = 鯱
- - そ/馬 + selector 3 = 豚
  - - ひ/辶 + そ/馬 + selector 3 = 遯
  - - れ/口 + そ/馬 + selector 3 = 啄
  - - へ/⺩ + そ/馬 + selector 3 = 琢
- - は/辶 + selector 3 = 遊
  - - に/氵 + は/辶 + selector 3 = 游
  - - む/車 + は/辶 + selector 3 = 蝣
- - せ/食 + selector 3 = 酉
  - - ひ/辶 + せ/食 + selector 3 = 逎
- - selector 3 + め/目 = 乂
  - - め/目 + selector 3 + selector 3 = 睿
- - selector 3 + え/訁 = 云
- - selector 3 + む/車 = 冓
  - - ひ/辶 + selector 3 + む/車 = 遘
- - selector 3 + う/宀/#3 = 冢
- - selector 3 + か/金 = 咼
- - selector 3 + け/犬 = 夫
  - - た/⽥ + selector 3 + け/犬 = 畉
  - - 心 + selector 3 + け/犬 = 芙
  - - み/耳 + selector 3 + け/犬 = 趺
  - - む/車 + selector 3 + け/犬 = 輦
  - - す/発 + selector 3 + け/犬 = 麸
- - selector 3 + に/氵 = 奚
- - selector 3 + 仁/亻 = 尢
- - selector 3 + き/木 = 已
- - selector 3 + こ/子 = 巽
- - selector 3 + ね/示 = 幵
  - - き/木 + selector 3 + ね/示 = 枅
- - selector 3 + と/戸 = 并
- - selector 3 + 囗 = 弋
- - selector 3 + ひ/辶 = 戌
- - selector 3 + ほ/方 = 敖
  - - 火 + selector 3 + ほ/方 = 熬
  - - む/車 + selector 3 + ほ/方 = 螯
  - - ひ/辶 + selector 3 + ほ/方 = 遨
  - - せ/食 + selector 3 + ほ/方 = 鰲
- - selector 3 + ふ/女 = 聿
  - - や/疒 + selector 3 + ふ/女 = 肄
- - selector 3 + ゆ/彳 = 臾
  - - ⺼ + selector 3 + ゆ/彳 = 腴
- - selector 3 + や/疒 = 艮
  - - け/犬 + selector 3 + や/疒 = 狠
  - - み/耳 + selector 3 + や/疒 = 跟
- - selector 3 + そ/馬 = 曾
- - selector 3 + く/艹 = 艸
- - selector 3 + み/耳 = 襄
- - る/忄 + selector 3 + そ/馬 = 忸
- - 氷/氵 + selector 3 + は/辶 = 敝
- - 日 + selector 3 + は/辶 = 暼
- - も/門 + 宿 + selector 3 = 匸
