= Braille pattern dots-12456 =

Braille pattern

6-dot braille cells
⠀	⠁	⠃	⠉	⠙	⠑	⠋	⠛	⠓	⠊	⠚	⠈	⠘
⠄	⠅	⠇	⠍	⠝	⠕	⠏	⠟	⠗	⠎	⠞	⠌	⠜
⠤	⠥	⠧	⠭	⠽	⠵	⠯	⠿	⠷	⠮	⠾	⠬	⠼
⠠	⠡	⠣	⠩	⠹	⠱	⠫	⠻	⠳	⠪	⠺	⠨	⠸
shift down	⠂	⠆	⠒	⠲	⠢	⠖	⠶	⠦	⠔	⠴	⠐	⠰

The Braille pattern dots-12456 ( ⠻ ) is a 6-dot braille cell with both top, both middle, and the bottom right dots raised, or an 8-dot braille cell with both top, both upper-middle, and the lower-middle right dots raised. It is represented by the Unicode code point U+283b, and in Braille ASCII with a closing bracket: ].

Character information
Preview	⠻ (braille pattern dots-12456)	
Unicode name	BRAILLE PATTERN DOTS-12456	
Encodings	decimal	hex
Unicode	10299	U+283B
UTF-8	226 160 187	E2 A0 BB
Numeric character reference	&#10299;	&#x283B;
Braille ASCII	93	5D

== Unified Braille ==
In unified international braille, the braille pattern dots-12456 is used to represent coronal or dorsal flaps, trills, or approximant consonants such as /r/, /ɹ/, /ɽ/, or /ʀ/ when multiple letters correspond to these values, and is otherwise assigned as needed.

=== Table of unified braille values ===
French Braille	Ï, mathematical 7, gr, "grand"
English Braille	er
German Braille	er
Bharati Braille	ड़ / ੜ / ড় / ଡ଼ / ఱ / ಱ / റ / ற / ඈ / ڑ
Icelandic Braille	Ú
IPA Braille	/ð/
Slovak Braille	/ (slash)
Thai Braille	ง ng
Luxembourgish Braille	7 (seven)
Spanish Braille	ñ

== Other braille ==
Japanese Braille	se / せ / セ
Korean Braille	yeong / 영
Mainland Chinese Braille	wan, -uan
Taiwanese Braille	wan, -uan / ㄨㄢ
Two-Cell Chinese Braille	-ái, 还 hái
Nemeth Braille	cancel (close), termination indicator
Gardner Salinas Braille	7
Algerian Braille	ـْ (sukūn)

== Plus dots 7 and 8 ==
Related to Braille pattern dots-12456 are Braille patterns 124567, 124568, and 1245678, which are used in 8-dot braille systems, such as Gardner-Salinas and Luxembourgish Braille.

Character information
Preview	⡻ (braille pattern dots-124567)		⢻ (braille pattern dots-124568)		⣻ (braille pattern dots-1245678)	
Unicode name	BRAILLE PATTERN DOTS-124567		BRAILLE PATTERN DOTS-124568		BRAILLE PATTERN DOTS-1245678	
Encodings	decimal	hex	dec	hex	dec	hex
Unicode	10363	U+287B	10427	U+28BB	10491	U+28FB
UTF-8	226 161 187	E2 A1 BB	226 162 187	E2 A2 BB	226 163 187	E2 A3 BB
Numeric character reference	&#10363;	&#x287B;	&#10427;	&#x28BB;	&#10491;	&#x28FB;

	dots 124567	dots 124568	dots 1245678
Gardner Salinas Braille		†	

== Related 8-dot kantenji patterns ==
In the Japanese kantenji braille, the standard 8-dot Braille patterns 23568, 123568, 234568, and 1234568 are the patterns related to Braille pattern dots-12456, since the two additional dots of kantenji patterns 012456, 124567, and 0124567 are placed above the base 6-dot cell, instead of below, as in standard 8-dot braille.

Character information
Preview	⢶ (braille pattern dots-23568)		⢷ (braille pattern dots-123568)		⢾ (braille pattern dots-234568)		⢿ (braille pattern dots-1234568)	
Unicode name	BRAILLE PATTERN DOTS-23568		BRAILLE PATTERN DOTS-123568		BRAILLE PATTERN DOTS-234568		BRAILLE PATTERN DOTS-1234568	
Encodings	decimal	hex	dec	hex	dec	hex	dec	hex
Unicode	10422	U+28B6	10423	U+28B7	10430	U+28BE	10431	U+28BF
UTF-8	226 162 182	E2 A2 B6	226 162 183	E2 A2 B7	226 162 190	E2 A2 BE	226 162 191	E2 A2 BF
Numeric character reference	&#10422;	&#x28B6;	&#10423;	&#x28B7;	&#10430;	&#x28BE;	&#10431;	&#x28BF;

=== Kantenji using braille patterns 23568, 123568, 234568, or 1234568 ===
This listing includes kantenji using Braille pattern dots-12456 for all 6349 kanji found in JIS C 6226-1978.

- - 食

==== Variants and thematic compounds ====
- - selector 4 + せ/食 = 毛
- - せ/食 + selector 1 = 鳥
- - せ/食 + selector 2 = 魚
- - せ/食 + selector 3 = 酉
- - せ/食 + selector 4 = 酸
- - せ/食 + selector 6 = 酋
- - 数 + せ/食 = 千
- - し/巿 + せ/食 = 青

==== Compounds of 食 ====
- - ん/止 + せ/食 = 飲
  - - ん/止 + ん/止 + せ/食 = 飮
- - せ/食 + む/車 = 蝕
- - せ/食 + 龸 = 飢
- - せ/食 + ん/止 = 飯
- - せ/食 + な/亻 = 飴
- - せ/食 + 仁/亻 = 飼
- - せ/食 + も/門 = 飽
- - せ/食 + ふ/女 = 飾
- - せ/食 + と/戸 = 餅
  - - せ/食 + せ/食 + と/戸 = 餠
- - せ/食 + え/訁 = 餌
- - せ/食 + ゑ/訁 = 餐
- - せ/食 + 囗 = 餓
- - せ/食 + ら/月 = 館
- - せ/食 + ゐ/幺 = 饗
- - れ/口 + せ/食 + せ/食 = 喰
- - れ/口 + せ/食 + せ/食 = 喰
- - せ/食 + 比 + ふ/女 = 飩
- - せ/食 + 龸 + け/犬 = 飫
- - ぬ/力 + 宿 + せ/食 = 飭
- - せ/食 + 宿 + ち/竹 = 餃
- - せ/食 + 囗 + こ/子 = 餉
- - せ/食 + ふ/女 + 龸 = 餒
- - せ/食 + 龸 + ほ/方 = 餔
- - せ/食 + く/艹 + ほ/方 = 餝
- - せ/食 + 宿 + 囗 = 餞
- - せ/食 + 宿 + ぬ/力 = 餡
- - せ/食 + 宿 + 火 = 餤
- - せ/食 + selector 6 + ら/月 = 餬
- - せ/食 + 宿 + う/宀/#3 = 餮
- - せ/食 + お/頁 + に/氵 = 餽
- - せ/食 + 龸 + ら/月 = 餾
- - せ/食 + 宿 + ⺼ = 饂
- - せ/食 + 龸 + ま/石 = 饅
- - せ/食 + 宿 + き/木 = 饉
- - せ/食 + を/貝 + き/木 = 饋
- - せ/食 + 宿 + こ/子 = 饌
- - せ/食 + る/忄 + selector 1 = 饐
- - せ/食 + ゐ/幺 + 囗 = 饑
- - せ/食 + 宿 + つ/土 = 饒
- - せ/食 + れ/口 + す/発 = 饕

==== Compounds of 毛 ====
- - と/戸 + せ/食 = 尾
  - - き/木 + と/戸 + せ/食 = 梶
- - ほ/方 + せ/食 = 毟
- - 龸 + せ/食 = 毫
- - き/木 + せ/食 = 耗
- - ほ/方 + selector 4 + せ/食 = 旄
- - せ/食 + selector 4 + せ/食 = 毳
- - 囗 + selector 4 + せ/食 = 氈
- - か/金 + selector 4 + せ/食 = 瓱
- - と/戸 + selector 4 + せ/食 = 耄
- - ま/石 + selector 4 + せ/食 = 麾

==== Compounds of 鳥 ====
- - 心 + せ/食 = 蔦
- - お/頁 + せ/食 = 鳩
- - 囗 + せ/食 = 鳴
- - も/門 + せ/食 = 鴎
- - こ/子 + せ/食 = 鴨
- - 火 + せ/食 = 鴬
- - ら/月 + せ/食 = 鵬
- - た/⽥ + せ/食 = 鵯
- - ゐ/幺 + せ/食 = 鶏
  - - ゐ/幺 + ゐ/幺 + せ/食 = 鷄
- - 比 + せ/食 = 鶴
- - 仁/亻 + せ/食 = 鷲
- - み/耳 + せ/食 = 鷺
- - せ/食 + や/疒 = 島
  - - て/扌 + せ/食 + や/疒 = 搗
  - - き/木 + せ/食 + や/疒 = 槝
- - せ/食 + う/宀/#3 = 烏
  - - れ/口 + せ/食 + う/宀/#3 = 嗚
  - - つ/土 + せ/食 + う/宀/#3 = 塢
- - や/疒 + せ/食 + selector 1 = 嶋
- - き/木 + せ/食 + selector 1 = 樢
- - selector 4 + せ/食 + selector 1 = 鳫
- - 宿 + せ/食 + selector 1 = 鳬
- - ひ/辶 + せ/食 + selector 1 = 鶫
- - め/目 + せ/食 + selector 1 = 鷆
- - よ/广 + せ/食 + selector 1 = 鷸
- - 龸 + せ/食 + selector 1 = 鷽
- - や/疒 + う/宀/#3 + せ/食 = 嶌
- - き/木 + 宿 + せ/食 = 梟
- - 龸 + う/宀/#3 + せ/食 = 鳧
- - な/亻 + 龸 + せ/食 = 鳰
- - む/車 + 宿 + せ/食 = 鳳
- - と/戸 + 宿 + せ/食 = 鳶
- - て/扌 + 宿 + せ/食 = 鴃
- - 氷/氵 + 宿 + せ/食 = 鴆
- - ろ/十 + 龸 + せ/食 = 鴇
- - よ/广 + 龸 + せ/食 = 鴈
- - め/目 + 宿 + せ/食 = 鴉
- - ろ/十 + 宿 + せ/食 = 鴒
- - ひ/辶 + 龸 + せ/食 = 鴕
- - さ/阝 + 宿 + せ/食 = 鴛
- - ん/止 + 宿 + せ/食 = 鴟
- - れ/口 + 龸 + せ/食 = 鴣
- - お/頁 + 宿 + せ/食 = 鴦
- - う/宀/#3 + 宿 + せ/食 = 鴪
- - た/⽥ + 宿 + せ/食 = 鴫
- - に/氵 + 宿 + せ/食 = 鴻
- - む/車 + 龸 + せ/食 = 鴾
- - り/分 + 龸 + せ/食 = 鴿
- - ち/竹 + 宿 + せ/食 = 鵁
- - ゆ/彳 + 龸 + せ/食 = 鵄
- - ゆ/彳 + う/宀/#3 + せ/食 = 鵆
- - み/耳 + 龸 + せ/食 = 鵈
- - ふ/女 + 宿 + せ/食 = 鵐
- - ら/月 + 宿 + せ/食 = 鵑
- - を/貝 + 龸 + せ/食 = 鵙
- - ゆ/彳 + 宿 + せ/食 = 鵜
- - 囗 + selector 1 + せ/食 = 鵝
- - 囗 + 宿 + せ/食 = 鵞
- - く/艹 + 宿 + せ/食 = 鵠
- - 囗 + 龸 + せ/食 = 鵡
- - 囗 + う/宀/#3 + せ/食 = 鵤
- - ね/示 + 宿 + せ/食 = 鵲
- - 龸 + 龸 + せ/食 = 鵺
- - ひ/辶 + う/宀/#3 + せ/食 = 鶇
- - 龸 + 宿 + せ/食 = 鶉
- - け/犬 + 龸 + せ/食 = 鶚
- - 宿 + 宿 + せ/食 = 鶤
- - よ/广 + う/宀/#3 + せ/食 = 鶩
- - 火 + 宿 + せ/食 = 鶯
- - こ/子 + 宿 + せ/食 = 鶲
- - ひ/辶 + 宿 + せ/食 = 鶸
- - 仁/亻 + 宿 + せ/食 = 鶺
- - か/金 + 宿 + せ/食 = 鶻
- - り/分 + 宿 + せ/食 = 鷁
- - か/金 + 龸 + せ/食 = 鷂
- - め/目 + 龸 + せ/食 = 鷏
- - と/戸 + 龸 + せ/食 = 鷓
- - つ/土 + 龸 + せ/食 = 鷙
- - い/糹/#2 + 宿 + せ/食 = 鷦
- - の/禾 + 宿 + せ/食 = 鷭
- - ろ/十 + う/宀/#3 + せ/食 = 鷯
- - よ/广 + 宿 + せ/食 = 鷹
- - を/貝 + 宿 + せ/食 = 鸚
- - け/犬 + 宿 + せ/食 = 鸛
- - え/訁 + 宿 + せ/食 = 鸞

==== Compounds of 魚 ====
- - せ/食 + 氷/氵 = 漁
- - せ/食 + 日 = 魯
- - せ/食 + つ/土 = 鮭
- - せ/食 + そ/馬 = 鮮
  - - や/疒 + せ/食 + そ/馬 = 癬
  - - 心 + せ/食 + そ/馬 = 蘚
- - せ/食 + り/分 = 鯉
- - せ/食 + た/⽥ = 鯛
- - せ/食 + れ/口 = 鯨
- - せ/食 + け/犬 = 鰐
- - せ/食 + の/禾 = 鱗
- - せ/食 + 宿 + ほ/方 = 魴
- - せ/食 + り/分 + か/金 = 鮃
- - せ/食 + れ/口 + と/戸 = 鮎
- - せ/食 + も/門 + selector 2 = 鮑
- - せ/食 + な/亻 + し/巿 = 鮒
- - せ/食 + 宿 + さ/阝 = 鮓
- - せ/食 + う/宀/#3 + ま/石 = 鮖
- - せ/食 + す/発 + selector 1 = 鮗
- - せ/食 + う/宀/#3 + ふ/女 = 鮟
- - せ/食 + く/艹 + さ/阝 = 鮠
- - せ/食 + 宿 + に/氵 = 鮨
- - せ/食 + ろ/十 + ら/月 = 鮪
- - せ/食 + 龸 + ち/竹 = 鮫
- - せ/食 + な/亻 + き/木 = 鮴
- - せ/食 + そ/馬 + ⺼ = 鮹
- - せ/食 + 龸 + ゐ/幺 = 鯀
- - せ/食 + selector 6 + ほ/方 = 鯆
- - せ/食 + 氷/氵 + ほ/方 = 鯊
- - せ/食 + の/禾 + ぬ/力 = 鯏
- - せ/食 + め/目 + し/巿 = 鯑
- - せ/食 + 龸 + つ/土 = 鯒
- - せ/食 + ら/月 + た/⽥ = 鯔
- - せ/食 + selector 4 + 火 = 鯡
- - せ/食 + こ/子 + 宿 = 鯢
- - せ/食 + 日 + 数 = 鯣
- - せ/食 + 日 + 比 = 鯤
- - せ/食 + り/分 + 心 = 鯰
- - せ/食 + す/発 + selector 3 = 鯱
- - せ/食 + ほ/方 + 龸 = 鯲
- - せ/食 + selector 1 + う/宀/#3 = 鯵
- - せ/食 + け/犬 + 日 = 鰆
- - せ/食 + 宿 + よ/广 = 鰈
- - せ/食 + 日 + へ/⺩ = 鰉
- - せ/食 + 比 + ひ/辶 = 鰊
- - せ/食 + の/禾 + 火 = 鰍
- - せ/食 + 龸 + す/発 = 鰒
- - せ/食 + た/⽥ + 心 = 鰓
- - せ/食 + う/宀/#3 + の/禾 = 鰕
- - せ/食 + 龸 + ⺼ = 鰛
- - せ/食 + う/宀/#3 + ら/月 = 鰡
- - せ/食 + し/巿 + ら/月 = 鰤
- - せ/食 + ⺼ + そ/馬 = 鰥
- - せ/食 + 宿 + と/戸 = 鰭
- - せ/食 + う/宀/#3 + ⺼ = 鰮
- - せ/食 + ゆ/彳 + ゆ/彳 = 鰯
- - せ/食 + ね/示 + し/巿 = 鰰
- - せ/食 + selector 3 + ほ/方 = 鰲
- - せ/食 + つ/土 + す/発 = 鰹
- - せ/食 + う/宀/#3 + う/宀/#3 = 鰺
- - せ/食 + 宿 + ま/石 = 鰻
- - せ/食 + に/氵 + ね/示 = 鰾
- - せ/食 + ま/石 + ろ/十 = 鱆
- - せ/食 + よ/广 + ゆ/彳 = 鱇
- - せ/食 + つ/土 + 囗 = 鱚
- - せ/食 + り/分 + え/訁 = 鱠
- - せ/食 + た/⽥ + と/戸 = 鱧
- - せ/食 + そ/馬 + や/疒 = 鱶
- - せ/食 + 宿 + た/⽥ = 鱸

==== Compounds of 酉 ====
- - せ/食 + き/木 = 配
- - せ/食 + に/氵 = 酒
- - せ/食 + ろ/十 = 酔
  - - せ/食 + せ/食 + ろ/十 = 醉
- - せ/食 + さ/阝 = 酢
- - せ/食 + す/発 = 酪
- - せ/食 + か/金 = 酬
- - せ/食 + こ/子 = 酵
- - せ/食 + く/艹 = 酷
- - せ/食 + お/頁 = 醜
- - せ/食 + み/耳 = 醸
  - - せ/食 + せ/食 + み/耳 = 釀
- - ひ/辶 + せ/食 + selector 3 = 逎
- - せ/食 + 数 + て/扌 = 酊
- - せ/食 + 比 + も/門 = 酌
- - せ/食 + 比 + し/巿 = 酎
- - せ/食 + 氷/氵 + 龸 = 酖
- - せ/食 + 宿 + の/禾 = 酘
- - せ/食 + selector 4 + る/忄 = 酣
- - せ/食 + 龸 + の/禾 = 酥
- - せ/食 + ほ/方 + れ/口 = 酩
- - せ/食 + れ/口 + へ/⺩ = 酲
- - せ/食 + 宿 + ゐ/幺 = 酳
- - せ/食 + き/木 + き/木 = 醂
- - せ/食 + 龸 + こ/子 = 醇
- - せ/食 + 日 + ね/示 = 醋
- - せ/食 + 日 + よ/广 = 醍
- - せ/食 + れ/口 + ろ/十 = 醐
- - せ/食 + 日 + い/糹/#2 = 醒
- - せ/食 + 宿 + す/発 = 醗
- - せ/食 + 比 + 数 = 醢
- - せ/食 + へ/⺩ + selector 2 = 醤
- - せ/食 + む/車 + selector 2 = 醪
- - せ/食 + 宿 + く/艹 = 醯
- - せ/食 + 龸 + た/⽥ = 醴
- - せ/食 + す/発 + そ/馬 = 醵
- - せ/食 + く/艹 + 火 = 醺
- - せ/食 + 囗 + り/分 = 釁

==== Compounds of 酋 ====
- - け/犬 + せ/食 = 猶
  - - 心 + け/犬 + せ/食 = 蕕
- - せ/食 + し/巿 = 尊
  - - つ/土 + せ/食 + し/巿 = 墫
  - - み/耳 + せ/食 + し/巿 = 蹲
  - - せ/食 + せ/食 + し/巿 = 鱒
- - ひ/辶 + せ/食 = 遵
- - 心 + せ/食 + selector 6 = 楢
- - ひ/辶 + せ/食 + selector 6 = 遒
- - せ/食 + せ/食 + selector 6 = 鰌
- - せ/食 + せ/食 + selector 6 = 鰌
- - せ/食 + 比 + け/犬 = 奠
- - せ/食 + 宿 + け/犬 = 猷
- - み/耳 + 宿 + せ/食 = 躑

==== Compounds of 千 ====
- - れ/口 + せ/食 = 舌
  - - え/訁 + せ/食 = 話
  - - に/氵 + せ/食 = 活
    - - も/門 + れ/口 + せ/食 = 闊
    - - も/門 + に/氵 + せ/食 = 濶
  - - せ/食 + を/貝 = 乱
    - - せ/食 + せ/食 + を/貝 = 亂
  - - せ/食 + 心 = 憩
    - - せ/食 + せ/食 + 心 = 憇
  - - せ/食 + る/忄 = 甜
  - - せ/食 + ま/石 = 辞
    - - せ/食 + せ/食 + ま/石 = 辭
  - - ぬ/力 + れ/口 + せ/食 = 刮
  - - る/忄 + れ/口 + せ/食 = 恬
  - - み/耳 + れ/口 + せ/食 = 聒
  - - ん/止 + れ/口 + せ/食 = 舐
  - - む/車 + れ/口 + せ/食 = 蛞
  - - か/金 + れ/口 + せ/食 = 銛
  - - り/分 + せ/食 = 舎
    - - り/分 + り/分 + せ/食 = 舍
      - - せ/食 + 宿 + ら/月 = 舘
    - - て/扌 + せ/食 = 捨
- - な/亻 + 数 + せ/食 = 仟
- - ぬ/力 + 数 + せ/食 = 刋
- - ま/石 + 数 + せ/食 = 竏
- - さ/阝 + 数 + せ/食 = 阡

==== Compounds of 青 ====
- - る/忄 + せ/食 = 情
- - 日 + せ/食 = 晴
- - 氷/氵 + せ/食 = 清
- - の/禾 + せ/食 = 精
- - ゑ/訁 + せ/食 = 請
- - か/金 + せ/食 = 錆
- - ま/石 + せ/食 = 靖
- - せ/食 + 宿 = 静
  - - に/氵 + せ/食 + 宿 = 瀞
  - - せ/食 + せ/食 + 宿 = 靜
- - な/亻 + し/巿 + せ/食 = 倩
- - け/犬 + し/巿 + せ/食 = 猜
- - め/目 + し/巿 + せ/食 = 睛
- - 心 + し/巿 + せ/食 = 菁
- - む/車 + し/巿 + せ/食 = 蜻
- - せ/食 + し/巿 + せ/食 = 鯖

==== Other compounds ====
- - よ/广 + せ/食 = 席
  - - く/艹 + よ/广 + せ/食 = 蓆
- - め/目 + せ/食 = 眉
  - - や/疒 + め/目 + せ/食 = 嵋
- - い/糹/#2 + せ/食 = 繕
- - ゆ/彳 + せ/食 = 衡
- - さ/阝 + せ/食 = 隆
  - - や/疒 + さ/阝 + せ/食 = 嶐
  - - う/宀/#3 + さ/阝 + せ/食 = 窿
- - ち/竹 + せ/食 = 雪
  - - ⺼ + ち/竹 + せ/食 = 膤
  - - ふ/女 + ち/竹 + せ/食 = 艝
  - - む/車 + ち/竹 + せ/食 = 轌
  - - せ/食 + ち/竹 + せ/食 = 鱈
- - せ/食 + ぬ/力 = 制
  - - せ/食 + て/扌 = 掣
  - - せ/食 + ね/示 = 製
- - せ/食 + い/糹/#2 = 生
  - - ゆ/彳 + せ/食 + い/糹/#2 = 徃
  - - ほ/方 + せ/食 + い/糹/#2 = 旌
  - - な/亻 + せ/食 + い/糹/#2 = 甦
  - - ち/竹 + せ/食 + い/糹/#2 = 笙
- - せ/食 + ひ/辶 = 成
  - - せ/食 + ⺼ = 盛
  - - 日 + せ/食 + ひ/辶 = 晟
  - - ち/竹 + せ/食 + ひ/辶 = 筬
  - - せ/食 + ひ/辶 + ふ/女 = 鰄
  - - せ/食 + ひ/辶 + selector 3 = 鰔
- - せ/食 + た/⽥ + ぬ/力 = 甥
- - つ/土 + 宿 + せ/食 = 燕
  - - れ/口 + 宿 + せ/食 = 嚥
- - せ/食 + ん/止 + の/禾 = 囓
- - な/亻 + 宿 + せ/食 = 雁
- - や/疒 + 宿 + せ/食 = 雉
