= Braille pattern dots-12345 =

Braille pattern

6-dot braille cells
⠀	⠁	⠃	⠉	⠙	⠑	⠋	⠛	⠓	⠊	⠚	⠈	⠘
⠄	⠅	⠇	⠍	⠝	⠕	⠏	⠟	⠗	⠎	⠞	⠌	⠜
⠤	⠥	⠧	⠭	⠽	⠵	⠯	⠿	⠷	⠮	⠾	⠬	⠼
⠠	⠡	⠣	⠩	⠹	⠱	⠫	⠻	⠳	⠪	⠺	⠨	⠸
shift down	⠂	⠆	⠒	⠲	⠢	⠖	⠶	⠦	⠔	⠴	⠐	⠰

The Braille pattern dots-12345 ( ⠟ ) is a 6-dot braille cell with the all top and middle dots and the bottom left dot raised, or an 8-dot braille cell with the top four and lower-middle left dots raised. It is represented by the Unicode code point U+281f, and in Braille ASCII with Q.

Character information
Preview	⠟ (braille pattern dots-12345)	
Unicode name	BRAILLE PATTERN DOTS-12345	
Encodings	decimal	hex
Unicode	10271	U+281F
UTF-8	226 160 159	E2 A0 9F
Numeric character reference	&#10271;	&#x281F;
Braille ASCII	81	51

== Unified Braille ==
In unified international braille, the braille pattern dots-12345 is used to represent double consonants, such as /kw/ or /kʃ/ or otherwise as needed.

=== Table of unified braille values ===
French Braille	Q, qu, -que, "que"
English Braille	Q
English Contraction	quite
German Braille	Q
Bharati Braille	क्ष / ક્ષ / ক্ষ / କ୍ଷ / క్ష / ಕ್ಷ / ക്ഷ / க்ஷ / ඥ / ق
Icelandic Braille	Q
IPA Braille	/q/
Russian Braille	Ч
Arabic Braille	ق
Persian Braille	ق
Irish Braille	Q
Thai Braille	เือ eua
Luxembourgish Braille	q (minuscule)

== Other braille ==
Japanese Braille	te / て / テ
Korean Braille	in / 인
Mainland Chinese Braille	ch
Taiwanese Braille	f / ㄈ
Two-Cell Chinese Braille	ni- -āi, 你 nǐ
Algerian Braille	ظ

== Plus dots 7 and 8 ==
Related to Braille pattern dots-12345 are Braille patterns 123457, 123458, and 1234578, which are used in 8-dot braille systems, such as Gardner-Salinas and Luxembourgish Braille.

Character information
Preview	⡟ (braille pattern dots-123457)		⢟ (braille pattern dots-123458)		⣟ (braille pattern dots-1234578)	
Unicode name	BRAILLE PATTERN DOTS-123457		BRAILLE PATTERN DOTS-123458		BRAILLE PATTERN DOTS-1234578	
Encodings	decimal	hex	dec	hex	dec	hex
Unicode	10335	U+285F	10399	U+289F	10463	U+28DF
UTF-8	226 161 159	E2 A1 9F	226 162 159	E2 A2 9F	226 163 159	E2 A3 9F
Numeric character reference	&#10335;	&#x285F;	&#10399;	&#x289F;	&#10463;	&#x28DF;

	dots 123457	dots 123458	dots 1234578
Gardner Salinas Braille	Q (capital)		
Luxembourgish Braille	Q (capital)		

== Related 8-dot kantenji patterns ==
In the Japanese kantenji braille, the standard 8-dot Braille patterns 23567, 123567, 234567, and 1234567 are the patterns related to Braille pattern dots-12345, since the two additional dots of kantenji patterns 012345, 123457, and 0123457 are placed above the base 6-dot cell, instead of below, as in standard 8-dot braille.

Character information
Preview	⡶ (braille pattern dots-23567)		⡷ (braille pattern dots-123567)		⡾ (braille pattern dots-234567)		⡿ (braille pattern dots-1234567)	
Unicode name	BRAILLE PATTERN DOTS-23567		BRAILLE PATTERN DOTS-123567		BRAILLE PATTERN DOTS-234567		BRAILLE PATTERN DOTS-1234567	
Encodings	decimal	hex	dec	hex	dec	hex	dec	hex
Unicode	10358	U+2876	10359	U+2877	10366	U+287E	10367	U+287F
UTF-8	226 161 182	E2 A1 B6	226 161 183	E2 A1 B7	226 161 190	E2 A1 BE	226 161 191	E2 A1 BF
Numeric character reference	&#10358;	&#x2876;	&#10359;	&#x2877;	&#10366;	&#x287E;	&#10367;	&#x287F;

=== Kantenji using braille patterns 23567, 123567, 234567, or 1234567 ===
This listing includes kantenji using Braille pattern dots-12345 for all 6349 kanji found in JIS C 6226-1978.

- - ⼿

==== Variants and thematic compounds ====
- - selector 4 + て/扌 = 専
  - - selector 4 + selector 4 + て/扌 = 專
- - selector 5 + て/扌 = 夬
- - selector 6 + て/扌 = 亭
- - て/扌 + selector 4 = 抽
- - て/扌 + selector 5 = 拘
- - 数 + て/扌 = 丁

==== Compounds of ⼿ ====
- - う/宀/#3 + て/扌 = 挙
  - - う/宀/#3 + う/宀/#3 + て/扌 = 擧
    - - ね/示 + う/宀/#3 + て/扌 = 襷
    - - selector 1 + う/宀/#3 + て/扌 = 舉
- - け/犬 + て/扌 = 拳
- - 龸 + て/扌 = 掌
- - せ/食 + て/扌 = 掣
- - よ/广 + て/扌 = 摩
- - 心 + て/扌 = 欅
- - て/扌 + ふ/女 + ゑ/訁 = 拏
- - て/扌 + り/分 + 囗 = 拿
- - て/扌 + selector 4 + ぬ/力 = 挈
- - て/扌 + 龸 + う/宀/#3 = 搴
- - て/扌 + つ/土 + お/頁 = 摯
- - て/扌 + 宿 + ま/石 = 擘
- - て/扌 + き/木 + き/木 = 攀
- - え/訁 + 宿 + て/扌 = 攣
- - 日 + て/扌 = 拍
- - す/発 + て/扌 = 拒
- - ま/石 + て/扌 = 拓
- - れ/口 + て/扌 = 括
- - と/戸 + て/扌 = 拷
- - そ/馬 + て/扌 = 挿
  - - そ/馬 + そ/馬 + て/扌 = 插
- - つ/土 + て/扌 = 捏
- - ん/止 + て/扌 = 捗
- - ぬ/力 + て/扌 = 揃
- - ふ/女 + て/扌 = 搬
- - ゐ/幺 + て/扌 = 携
- - み/耳 + て/扌 = 撮
- - ね/示 + て/扌 = 擦
- - め/目 + て/扌 = 攫
- - て/扌 + め/目 = 払
- - て/扌 + ゐ/幺 = 扱
- - て/扌 + け/犬 = 扶
  - - て/扌 + け/犬 + ほ/方 = 捧
- - て/扌 + 比 = 批
  - - て/扌 + 比 + 日 = 揩
- - て/扌 + は/辶 = 技
- - て/扌 + そ/馬 = 抄
- - て/扌 + さ/阝 = 抑
- - て/扌 + の/禾 = 投
- - て/扌 + 宿 = 抗
- - て/扌 + を/貝 = 折
  - - ひ/辶 + て/扌 = 逝
  - - 日 + て/扌 + を/貝 = 晢
  - - に/氵 + て/扌 + を/貝 = 浙
- - て/扌 + ゑ/訁 = 抜
  - - て/扌 + て/扌 + ゑ/訁 = 拔
- - て/扌 + た/⽥ = 択
- - て/扌 + ん/止 = 抵
- - て/扌 + 日 = 担
- - て/扌 + へ/⺩ = 拙
- - て/扌 + ぬ/力 = 招
- - て/扌 + こ/子 = 拡
- - て/扌 + 囗 = 拾
- - て/扌 + し/巿 = 持
- - て/扌 + に/氵 = 指
- - て/扌 + ふ/女 = 按
- - て/扌 + ろ/十 = 振
- - て/扌 + ほ/方 = 捕
- - て/扌 + せ/食 = 捨
- - て/扌 + る/忄 = 捻
- - て/扌 + り/分 = 掃
- - て/扌 + 龸 = 授
- - て/扌 + 火 = 排
- - て/扌 + と/戸 = 掘
- - て/扌 + つ/土 = 掛
- - て/扌 + ち/竹 = 採
- - て/扌 + す/発 = 探
- - て/扌 + ま/石 + selector 1 = 拉
  - - て/扌 + ま/石 = 接
  - - て/扌 + ま/石 + り/分 = 撞
- - て/扌 + き/木 = 控
- - て/扌 + い/糹/#2 = 推
- - て/扌 + 心 = 掩
- - て/扌 + ね/示 = 措
- - て/扌 + 氷/氵 = 掲
- - て/扌 + く/艹 = 描
- - て/扌 + よ/广 = 提
- - て/扌 + 数 = 揚
- - て/扌 + ⺼ = 換
- - て/扌 + ゆ/彳 = 握
- - て/扌 + む/車 = 揮
- - て/扌 + 仁/亻 = 援
- - て/扌 + か/金 = 揺
  - - て/扌 + て/扌 + か/金 = 搖
- - て/扌 + れ/口 = 損
- - て/扌 + み/耳 = 摂
  - - て/扌 + て/扌 + み/耳 = 攝
- - て/扌 + お/頁 = 摘
- - て/扌 + ら/月 = 撤
  - - て/扌 + ら/月 + 氷/氵 = 撒
- - て/扌 + な/亻 = 撲
- - て/扌 + ひ/辶 = 擁
- - て/扌 + う/宀/#3 = 操
- - て/扌 + や/疒 = 擬
- - て/扌 + て/扌 + め/目 = 拂
- - て/扌 + て/扌 + た/⽥ = 擇
- - て/扌 + て/扌 + 日 = 擔
- - て/扌 + て/扌 + こ/子 = 擴
- - て/扌 + 数 + を/貝 = 扎
- - て/扌 + 宿 + 仁/亻 = 托
- - て/扌 + こ/子 + selector 1 = 扛
- - て/扌 + 宿 + か/金 = 扞
- - て/扌 + selector 1 + ゑ/訁 = 扠
- - て/扌 + 宿 + た/⽥ = 扣
- - て/扌 + selector 1 + ぬ/力 = 扨
- - て/扌 + 宿 + り/分 = 扮
- - て/扌 + よ/广 + さ/阝 = 扼
- - て/扌 + selector 4 + 囗 = 找
- - て/扌 + へ/⺩ + selector 1 = 抂
- - て/扌 + 比 + 龸 = 抃
- - て/扌 + 宿 + ひ/辶 = 把
- - て/扌 + selector 4 + よ/广 = 抒
- - て/扌 + ⺼ + つ/土 = 抓
- - て/扌 + selector 4 + ふ/女 = 抔
- - て/扌 + 比 + と/戸 = 抖
- - て/扌 + う/宀/#3 + ぬ/力 = 抛
- - て/扌 + selector 4 + ひ/辶 = 披
- - て/扌 + う/宀/#3 + な/亻 = 抬
- - て/扌 + き/木 + selector 5 = 抹
- - て/扌 + selector 5 + し/巿 = 抻
- - て/扌 + selector 1 + を/貝 = 拆
- - て/扌 + 比 + は/辶 = 拇
- - て/扌 + れ/口 + と/戸 = 拈
- - て/扌 + な/亻 + し/巿 = 拊
- - て/扌 + ろ/十 + は/辶 = 拌
- - て/扌 + 宿 + ぬ/力 = 拐
- - て/扌 + selector 4 + る/忄 = 拑
- - て/扌 + ゐ/幺 + selector 1 = 拗
- - て/扌 + 宿 + 囗 = 拭
- - て/扌 + つ/土 + れ/口 = 拮
- - て/扌 + selector 6 + に/氵 = 拯
- - て/扌 + selector 4 + こ/子 = 拱
- - て/扌 + ろ/十 + こ/子 = 拵
- - て/扌 + 宿 + つ/土 = 挂
- - て/扌 + す/発 + れ/口 = 挌
- - て/扌 + 数 + 宿 = 挑
- - て/扌 + 宿 + な/亻 = 挟
- - て/扌 + む/車 + selector 2 = 挧
- - て/扌 + よ/广 + 仁/亻 = 挫
- - て/扌 + は/辶 + へ/⺩ = 挺
- - て/扌 + 宿 + 宿 = 挽
- - て/扌 + selector 5 + な/亻 = 挾
- - て/扌 + み/耳 + selector 2 = 捉
- - て/扌 + れ/口 + ね/示 = 捌
- - て/扌 + selector 4 + か/金 = 捍
- - て/扌 + 宿 + ら/月 = 捐
- - て/扌 + と/戸 + け/犬 = 捩
- - て/扌 + 宿 + も/門 = 捫
- - て/扌 + と/戸 + selector 1 = 据
- - て/扌 + け/犬 + さ/阝 = 捲
- - て/扌 + 宿 + に/氵 = 捶
- - て/扌 + ら/月 + か/金 = 捷
- - て/扌 + け/犬 + 仁/亻 = 捺
- - て/扌 + ん/止 + を/貝 = 掀
- - て/扌 + 日 + と/戸 = 掉
- - て/扌 + け/犬 + か/金 = 掎
- - て/扌 + 宿 + と/戸 = 掏
- - て/扌 + 龸 + な/亻 = 掖
- - て/扌 + う/宀/#3 + よ/广 = 掟
- - て/扌 + 龸 + れ/口 = 掠
- - て/扌 + み/耳 + ゑ/訁 = 掫
- - て/扌 + 心 + selector 2 = 掬
- - て/扌 + 囗 + へ/⺩ = 掴
- - て/扌 + り/分 + さ/阝 = 掵
- - て/扌 + 宿 + む/車 = 掻
- - て/扌 + 宿 + そ/馬 = 掾
- - て/扌 + 比 + ひ/辶 = 揀
- - て/扌 + 宿 + ゆ/彳 = 揄
- - て/扌 + 数 + す/発 = 揆
- - て/扌 + き/木 + よ/广 = 揉
- - て/扌 + 宿 + れ/口 = 揖
- - て/扌 + 宿 + の/禾 = 揣
- - て/扌 + み/耳 + さ/阝 = 揶
- - て/扌 + 龸 + む/車 = 搆
- - て/扌 + 宿 + は/辶 = 搏
- - て/扌 + そ/馬 + こ/子 = 搓
- - て/扌 + せ/食 + や/疒 = 搗
- - て/扌 + ゆ/彳 + ゆ/彳 = 搦
- - て/扌 + 宿 + 日 = 搨
- - て/扌 + と/戸 + 宿 = 搭
- - て/扌 + り/分 + お/頁 = 搶
- - て/扌 + う/宀/#3 + う/宀/#3 = 摎
- - て/扌 + 宿 + い/糹/#2 = 摧
- - て/扌 + 宿 + く/艹 = 摸
- - て/扌 + む/車 + 日 = 摺
- - て/扌 + 龸 + ぬ/力 = 撈
- - て/扌 + 宿 + 龸 = 撓
- - て/扌 + 宿 + を/貝 = 撕
- - て/扌 + け/犬 + 火 = 撚
- - て/扌 + 宿 + す/発 = 撥
- - て/扌 + 宿 + ろ/十 = 撩
- - て/扌 + む/車 + 火 = 撫
- - て/扌 + の/禾 + た/⽥ = 播
- - て/扌 + 宿 + こ/子 = 撰
- - て/扌 + 龸 + め/目 = 撹
- - て/扌 + ひ/辶 + た/⽥ = 撻
- - て/扌 + ひ/辶 + 心 = 撼
- - て/扌 + ち/竹 + た/⽥ = 擂
- - て/扌 + 囗 + れ/口 = 擅
- - て/扌 + 宿 + き/木 = 擒
- - て/扌 + さ/阝 + 龸 = 擠
- - て/扌 + selector 4 + な/亻 = 擡
- - て/扌 + 宿 + や/疒 = 擢
- - て/扌 + へ/⺩ + し/巿 = 擣
- - て/扌 + う/宀/#3 + を/貝 = 擯
- - て/扌 + も/門 + す/発 = 擱
- - て/扌 + 宿 + さ/阝 = 擲
- - て/扌 + 宿 + ち/竹 = 擶
- - て/扌 + す/発 + ら/月 = 擺
- - て/扌 + 日 + ゐ/幺 = 擽
- - て/扌 + selector 1 + ゆ/彳 = 擾
- - て/扌 + を/貝 + け/犬 = 攅
- - て/扌 + 宿 + み/耳 = 攘
- - て/扌 + や/疒 + selector 1 = 攜
- - て/扌 + く/艹 + い/糹/#2 = 攤
- - て/扌 + 宿 + め/目 = 攪
- - て/扌 + め/目 + す/発 = 攬
- - ち/竹 + 宿 + て/扌 = 箍

==== Compounds of 専 and 專 ====
- - ろ/十 + て/扌 = 博
  - - selector 1 + ろ/十 + て/扌 = 愽
- - ち/竹 + て/扌 = 簿
- - い/糹/#2 + て/扌 = 縛
- - く/艹 + て/扌 = 薄
- - て/扌 + selector 4 + て/扌 = 摶
- - 心 + selector 4 + て/扌 = 榑
- - き/木 + selector 4 + て/扌 = 槫
- - に/氵 + selector 4 + て/扌 = 溥
- - か/金 + selector 4 + て/扌 = 甎
- - ま/石 + selector 4 + て/扌 = 磚
- - を/貝 + selector 4 + て/扌 = 賻
- - な/亻 + 宿 + て/扌 = 傅
- - な/亻 + な/亻 + て/扌 = 傳
- - む/車 + む/車 + て/扌 = 轉
  - - れ/口 + む/車 + て/扌 = 囀
- - る/忄 + 宿 + て/扌 = 慱
- - ⺼ + 宿 + て/扌 = 膊
- - 心 + う/宀/#3 + て/扌 = 蓴

==== Compounds of 夬 ====
- - る/忄 + て/扌 = 快
- - に/氵 + て/扌 = 決
  - - に/氵 + に/氵 + て/扌 = 决
- - ゑ/訁 + て/扌 = 訣
- - ぬ/力 + 宿 + て/扌 = 刔
- - て/扌 + 宿 + て/扌 = 抉
- - ね/示 + 宿 + て/扌 = 袂
- - て/扌 + 宿 + せ/食 = 鴃

==== Compounds of 亭 ====
- - 仁/亻 + て/扌 = 停
- - に/氵 + selector 6 + て/扌 = 渟

==== Compounds of 抽 ====
- - て/扌 + え/訁 = 捜
  - - て/扌 + て/扌 + え/訁 = 搜
- - こ/子 + て/扌 = 押

==== Compounds of 拘 ====
- - て/扌 + も/門 = 抱

==== Compounds of 丁 ====
- - て/扌 + て/扌 = 打
- - 宿 + て/扌 = 寧
  - - れ/口 + 宿 + て/扌 = 嚀
  - - 心 + 宿 + て/扌 = 檸
  - - に/氵 + 宿 + て/扌 = 濘
  - - け/犬 + 宿 + て/扌 = 獰
  - - み/耳 + 宿 + て/扌 = 聹
- - 火 + て/扌 = 灯
- - た/⽥ + て/扌 = 町
- - え/訁 + て/扌 = 訂
- - を/貝 + て/扌 = 貯
- - か/金 + て/扌 = 釘
- - お/頁 + て/扌 = 頂
- - れ/口 + 数 + て/扌 = 叮
- - に/氵 + 数 + て/扌 = 汀
- - た/⽥ + 数 + て/扌 = 甼
- - や/疒 + 数 + て/扌 = 疔
- - ま/石 + 数 + て/扌 = 竚
- - い/糹/#2 + 数 + て/扌 = 紵
- - 心 + 数 + て/扌 = 苧
- - せ/食 + 数 + て/扌 = 酊
- - 仁/亻 + 宿 + て/扌 = 佇

==== Other compounds ====
- - 囗 + て/扌 = 団
  - - 囗 + 囗 + て/扌 = 團
- - な/亻 + て/扌 = 伝
- - む/車 + て/扌 = 転
- - や/疒 + お/頁 + て/扌 = 巓
- - て/扌 + の/禾 + selector 4 = 秉
- - さ/阝 + 宿 + て/扌 = 鄭
