= Jyutping =

Romanization scheme for Cantonese

- Jyutping Romanization
- Traditional Chinese: 粵拼
- Simplified Chinese: 粤拼
- Jyutping: jyut6 ping3
- Cantonese Yale: Yuhtping
- Literal meaning: Yue (i.e. Cantonese) spelling
Transcriptions
Standard Mandarin
- Hanyu Pinyin: Yuèpīn
- Bopomofo: ㄩㄝˋ ㄆㄧㄣ
- Gwoyeu Romatzyh: Yuehpin
- Wade–Giles: Yüeh^{4}-pʻin^{1}
- Tongyong Pinyin: Yuè-pin
- IPA: [ɥê.pʰín]
Yue: Cantonese
- Yale Romanization: Yuhtping
- Jyutping: jyut6 ping3
- Canton Romanization: yüd^{6} ping^{3}
- IPA: [jyt̚˨.pʰɪŋ˧]

The Linguistic Society of Hong Kong Cantonese Romanization Scheme, (Note: Chinese: 香港語言學學會粵語拼音方案; Jyutping: hoeng1 gong2 jyu5 jin4 hok6 hok6 wui2 jyut6 jyu5 ping3 jam1 fong1 on3) also known as Jyutping, is a romanisation system for Cantonese developed in 1993 by the Linguistic Society of Hong Kong (LSHK).

The name Jyutping (itself the Jyutping romanisation of its Chinese name, 粵拼) is a contraction of the official name, and it consists of the first Chinese characters of the terms jyut6 jyu5 (Chinese: 粵語; lit. 'Cantonese language') and ping3 jam1 (Chinese: 拼音; lit. 'phonetic alphabet'; pronounced pīnyīn in Mandarin).

Despite being intended as a system to indicate pronunciation, it has also been employed in writing Cantonese as an alphabetic language—in effect, elevating Jyutping from its assistive status to a written language.

== History ==
The Jyutping system departs from all previous Cantonese romanisation systems (approximately 12, including Robert Morrison's pioneering work of 1828, and the widely used Standard Romanization, Yale and Sidney Lau systems) by introducing z and c initials and the use of eo and oe in finals, as well as replacing the initial y, used in all previous systems, with j.

In 2018, it was updated to include the -a and -oet finals, to reflect syllables recognized as part of Cantonese phonology in 1997 by the Jyutping Work Group of the Linguistic Society of Hong Kong.

== Initials ==
b /p/ 巴	p /pʰ/ 怕	m /m/ 媽	f /f/ 花	
d /t/ 打	t /tʰ/ 他	n /n/ 那		l /l/ 啦
g /k/ 家	k /kʰ/ 卡	ng /ŋ/ 牙	h /h/ 蝦	
gw /kʷ/ 瓜	kw /kʷʰ/ 誇			w /w/ 蛙
z /ts/ 渣	c /tsʰ/ 叉		s /s/ 沙	j /j/ 也

== Finals ==
aa /aː/ 沙	aai /aːi̯/ 徙	aau /aːu̯/ 梢	aam /aːm/ 三	aan /aːn/ 山	aang /aːŋ/ 坑	aap /aːp̚/ 圾	aat /aːt̚/ 剎	aak /aːk̚/ 客
a /ɐ/	ai /ɐi̯/ 西	au /ɐu̯/ 收	am /ɐm/ 心	an /ɐn/ 新	ang /ɐŋ/ 笙	ap /ɐp̚/ 濕	at /ɐt̚/ 失	ak /ɐk̚/ 塞
e /ɛː/ 些	ei /ei̯/ 四	eu /ɛːu̯/ 掉	em /ɛːm/ 舔		eng /ɛːŋ/ 鄭	ep /ɛːp̚/ 夾	et /ɛːt̚/ 噼	ek /ɛːk̚/ 石
i /iː/ 詩		iu /iːu̯/ 消	im /iːm/ 閃	in /iːn/ 先	ing /ɪŋ/ 星	ip /iːp̚/ 攝	it /iːt̚/ 洩	ik /ɪk/ 識
o /ɔː/ 疏	oi /ɔːy̯/ 開	ou /ou̯/ 蘇		on /ɔːn/ 看	ong /ɔːŋ/ 康		ot /ɔːt̚/ 喝	ok /ɔːk̚/ 索
u /uː/ 夫	ui /uːy̯/ 灰			un /uːn/ 寬	ung /ʊŋ/ 鬆		ut /uːt̚/ 闊	uk /ʊk/ 叔
	eoi /ɵy̯/ 需			eon /ɵn/ 詢			eot /ɵt̚/ 摔	
oe /œː/ 鋸					oeng /œːŋ/ 商		oet /œːt̚/ 噶	oek /œːk̚/ 削
yu /yː/ 書				yun /yːn/ 孫			yut /yːt̚/ 雪	
			m /m̩/ 唔		ng /ŋ̍/ 吳			

- Only the finals m and ng can be used as standalone nasal syllables.
- Used for elided words in casual speech such as a6 in 四十四 (sei3 a6 sei3), elided from sei3 sap6 sei3.
- Referring to the colloquial pronunciation of these words.
- Used for onomatopoeias such as oet6 for belching or goet4 for snoring.

== Tones ==
There are nine tones in six distinct tone contours in Cantonese. However, as three of the nine are entering tones (入聲; jap6 sing1), which only appear in syllables ending with p, t, and k, they do not have separate tone numbers in Jyutping (though they do in the ILE romanization of Cantonese; these are shown in parentheses in the table below). A mnemonic which some use to remember this is 風水到時我哋必發達; fung1 seoi2 dou3 si4 ngo5 dei6 bit1 faat3 daat6 or "Feng Shui [dictates that] we will be lucky."

Tone name	jam1 ping4 (陰平)		jam1 soeng5 (陰上)		jam1 heoi3 (陰去)		joeng4 ping4 (陽平)		joeng4 soeng5 (陽上)		joeng4 heoi3 (陽去)		gou1 jam1 jap6 (高陰入)		dai1 jam1 jap6 (低陰入)		joeng4 jap6 (陽入)	
(In English)	high level or high falling		mid rising		mid level		low falling		low rising		low level		entering high level		entering mid level		entering low level	
Tone number	1		2		3		4		5		6		1 (7)		3 (8)		6 (9)	
Contour	˥ 55	˥˧ 53	˧˥ 35		˧ 33		˨˩ 21	˩ 11	˩˧ 13		˨ 22		˥ 5		˧ 3		˨ 2	
Character example	分	詩	粉	史	訓	試	焚	時	奮	市	份	是	忽	識	發	錫	佛	食
Character example	fan1	si1	fan2	si2	fan3	si3	fan4	si4	fan5	si5	fan6	si6	fat1	sik1	faat3	sek3	fat6	sik6

The Linguistic Society of Hong Kong sets these as normal numerals and opposes setting them as superscript or subscript:

It has come to our attention that the Jyutping tone numbers (1–6) are displayed as superscript or subscript in some materials. We would like to emphasise that the tone numbers should be represented as ASCII numerals. Using superscript or subscript styling or markup (such as <sup></sup> or CSS classes) is also going to render the tone less legible, and this practice is not recommended. We have no objection to using bold, italic or text colour to display the letters and the tone number separately.

This is distinct from Sidney Lau romanisation and Wade–Giles, which do use superscripts.

== Comparison with Yale romanisation ==
Jyutping and the Yale romanisation of Cantonese represent Cantonese pronunciations with the same letters in:

- The initials: b, p, m, f, d, t, n, l, g, k, ng, h, s, gw, kw, w.
- The vowel: aa (except when used alone), a, e, i, o, u, yu.
- The nasal stop: m, ng.
- The coda: i, u, m, n, ng, p, t, k.

But they differ in the following:

- The vowels eo and oe represent /ɵ/ and /œː/ respectively in Jyutping, whereas the eu represents both vowels in Yale.
- The initial j represents /j/ in Jyutping whereas y is used instead in Yale.
- The initial z represents /ts/ in Jyutping whereas j is used instead in Yale.
- The initial c represents /tsʰ/ in Jyutping whereas ch is used instead in Yale.
- In Jyutping, if no consonant precedes the vowel yu, then the initial j is appended before the vowel. In Yale, the corresponding initial y is never appended before yu under any circumstances.
- Jyutping defines five finals not in Yale: a /ɐ/, eu /ɛːu/, em /ɛːm/, ep /ɛːp/, oet /œːt/. These finals are used in colloquial Cantonese words, such as deu6 (掉), lem2 (舐), and gep6 (夾).
- To represent tones, only tone numbers are used in Jyutping whereas Yale traditionally uses tone marks together with the letter h (though tone numbers can be used in Yale as well).

== Comparison with ILE romanisation ==
Jyutping and ILE romanisation represent Cantonese pronunciations with the same letters in:

- The initials: b, p, m, f, d, t, n, l, g, k, ng, h, s, gw, kw, j, w.
- The vowel: aa, a, e, i, o, u.
- The nasal stop: m, ng.
- The coda: i (except for its use in the coda /y/ in Jyutping; see below), u, m, n, ng, p, t, k.

But they have some differences:

- The vowel oe represents both /ɵ/ and /œː/ in ILE whereas eo and oe represent /ɵ/ and /œː/ respectively in Jyutping.
- The vowel y represents /y/ in ILE whereas both yu (used in the nucleus) and i (used in the coda of the final -eoi) are used in Jyutping.
- The initial dz represents /ts/ in ILE whereas z is used instead in Jyutping.
- The initial ts represents /tsʰ/ in ILE whereas c is used instead in Jyutping.
- To represent tones, the numbers 1 to 9 are usually used in ILE, although the use of 1, 3, 6 to replace 7, 8, 9 for the checked tones is acceptable. However, only the numbers 1 to 6 are used in Jyutping.

== Examples ==
Traditional	Simplified	Romanization
廣州話	广州话	gwong2 zau1 waa2
粵語	粤语	jyut6 jyu5
你好	你好	nei5 hou2

Sample transcription of one of the 300 Tang Poems:

春曉 孟浩然	ceon1 hiu2 maang6 hou6 jin4	Meng Haoran
春眠不覺曉，	ceon1 min4 bat1 gok3 hiu2,	Sleeping past sunrise in springtime.
處處聞啼鳥。	cyu3 cyu3 man4 tai4 niu5.	Everywhere one hears birdsong.
夜來風雨聲，	je6 loi4 fung1 jyu5 sing1,	Night brings the sound of wind and rain,
花落知多少？	faa1 lok6 zi1 do1 siu2?	I wonder how many flowers fell?

== Jyutping input method ==
A Jyutping input method allows a user to type Chinese characters by entering their Jyutping romanization (with or without tone, depending on the system) and then presenting the user with a list of possible characters with that pronunciation.

As of macOS Ventura and iOS 16, Jyutping input in traditional Chinese characters is a built-in functionality on Mac under the name "Phonetic – Cantonese" and on iPhone and iPad under the name "Cantonese".

=== List of Jyutping keyboard input utilities ===
- TypeDuck (TypeDuck 打得粵拼輸入法)
- Online Jyutping Input Method (網上粵拼輸入法)
- MDBG Type Chinese
- Cantonese Phonetic IME (廣東話拼音輸入法, also called 'Cantonese Phonetic IME (CPIME) Jyutping' in Windows 10)
- RIME (小狼毫輸入法引擎)
- Jyutping Cantonese Keyboard App for iOS and macOS
- Gboard by Google for Android and iOS

== See also ==
- Cantonese phonology
