= Louis Braille =

French educator and inventor of braille (1809–1852)

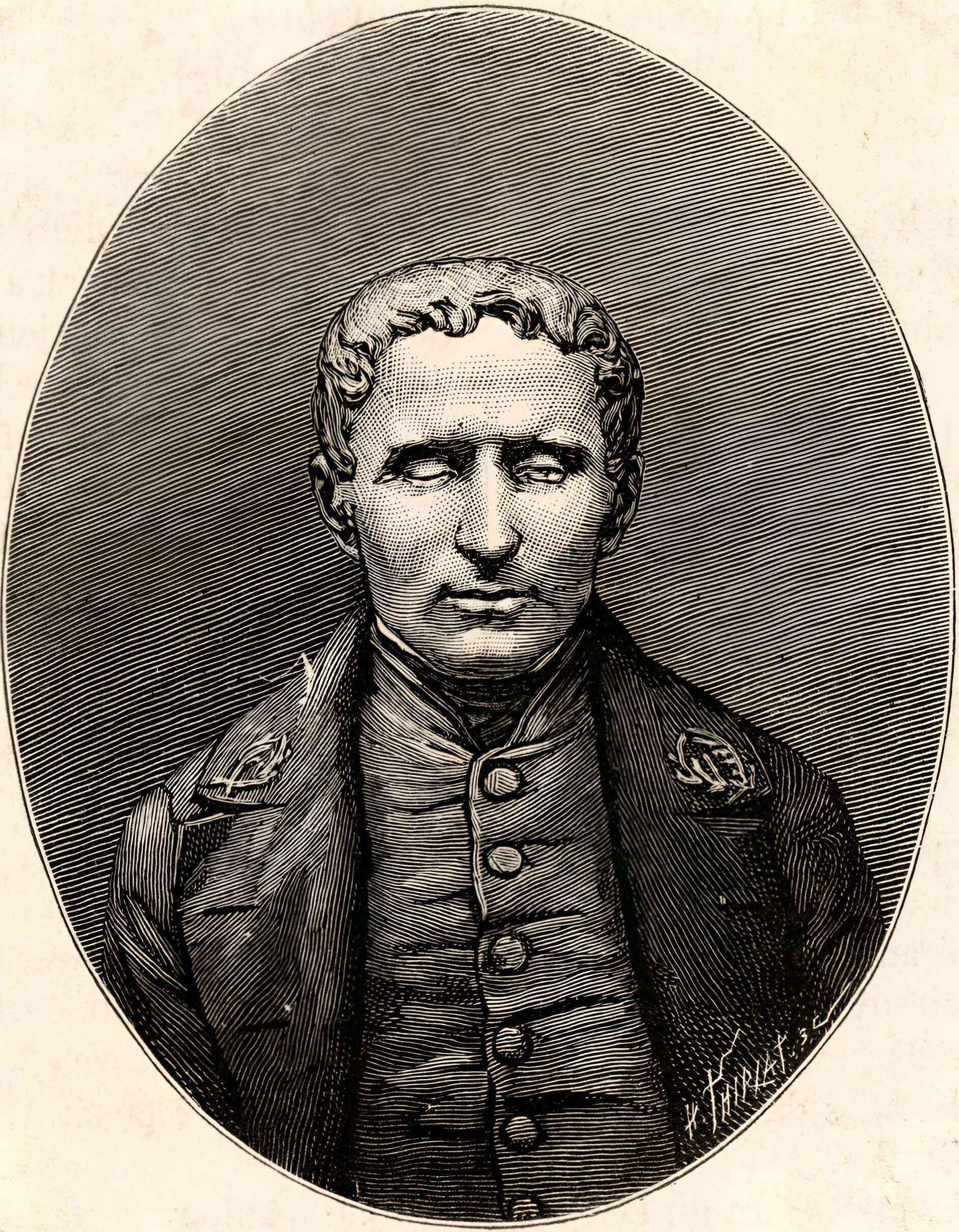
- Engraving by Henri Thiriat, 1877 (Note: The engraving is based on a daguerreotype (now lost) made of Braille's corpse soon after he had died.)
- Born: 4 January 1809; Coupvray, French Empire
- Died: 6 January 1852 (aged 43); Paris, France
- Occupations: Educator; inventor
- Known for: Braille

Louis Braille (/breɪl/ BRAYL; French: [lwi bʁɑj]; 4 January 1809 – 6 January 1852) was a French educator and the inventor of a reading and writing system named after him, braille, intended for use by visually impaired people. His system is used worldwide and remains virtually unchanged to this day.

Braille was blinded in one eye at the age of three. This occurred as a result from an accident with a stitching awl in his father's harness-making shop. Consequently, an infection set in and spread to both eyes, resulting in total blindness. At that time, there were not many resources in place for the blind, but he nevertheless excelled in his education and received a scholarship to France's Royal Institute for Blind Youth. While still a student there, he began developing a system of tactile code that could allow blind people to read and write quickly and efficiently. Inspired by a system invented by Charles Barbier, Braille's new method was more compact and lent itself to a range of uses, including music. He presented his work to his peers for the first time in 1825 when he was fifteen years old.

In adulthood, Braille served as a professor at the Institute and had an avocation as a musician, but he largely spent the remainder of his life refining and extending his system. It went unused by most educators for many years after his death, but posterity has recognized braille as a revolutionary invention, and it has been adapted for use in languages worldwide.

== Early life ==
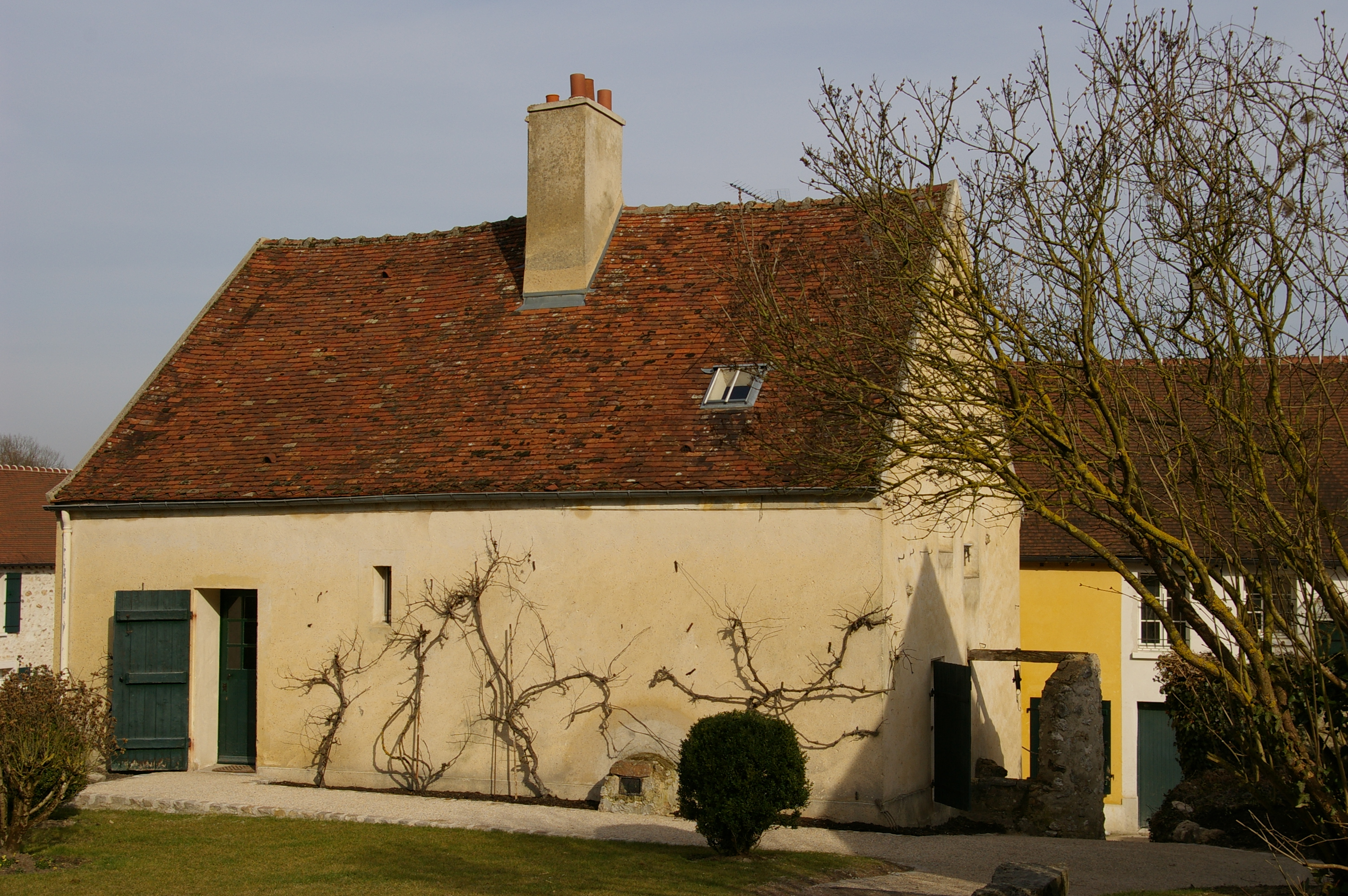
Louis Braille's childhood home in Coupvray, France. Current site of the Louis Braille museum.

Louis Braille was born in Coupvray, a small town about twenty miles east of Paris, on 4 January 1809. He and his three elder siblings – Monique Catherine (b. 1793), Louis-Simon (b. 1795), and Marie Céline (b. 1797) – lived with their parents, Simon-René and Monique, on three hectares of land and vineyard in the countryside. Simon-René maintained a successful enterprise as a leatherer and maker of horse tack.

As soon as he could walk, Braille's time was spent playing in his father's workshop. At the age of three, he was playing with some of the tools, trying to make holes in a piece of leather with an awl. Squinting closely at the surface, he pressed down hard to drive the point in, and the awl glanced across the tough leather and stabbed him in one of his eyes. A local physician bound and patched the affected eye and even arranged for Braille to be met the next day in Paris by a surgeon, but no treatment could save the damaged organ. In agony, the young boy suffered for weeks as the wound became severely infected. He eventually lost sight in the other eye, likely due to sympathetic ophthalmia. (Note: It remains uncertain which eye was actually struck first. Most accounts of Braille's accident create reference to left or right. Braille's American biographer J. Alvin Kugelmass wrote that it was the left eye, but C. Michael Mellor and Lennard Bickel state definitively that it was the right.)

Braille survived the torment of the infection, but by the age of five he was completely blind in both eyes. Due to his young age, he did not realize at first that he had lost his sight, and often asked why it was always dark. His parents made many efforts – quite uncommon for the era – to raise their youngest child in a normal fashion, and he prospered in their care. He learned to navigate the village and country paths with canes his father hewed for him, and he grew up seemingly at peace with his disability. Braille's bright and creative mind impressed the local teachers and priests, and he was accommodated with higher education.

== Blind education ==
Braille studied in Coupvray until the age of ten. Because of his intelligence and diligence, Braille was permitted to attend one of the first schools for blind children in the world, the Royal Institute for Blind Youth, since renamed to the National Institute for Blind Youth in Paris. The last of his family's children to leave the household, Braille departed for the school in February 1819. At that time the Royal Institute was an underfunded, ramshackle affair, but it provided a relatively stable environment for blind children to learn and associate together. While a student at the school, Braille made lifelong friends, including Gabriel Gauthier, Hippolyte Coltat, and Jean-Pierre Binet.

=== Haüy system ===
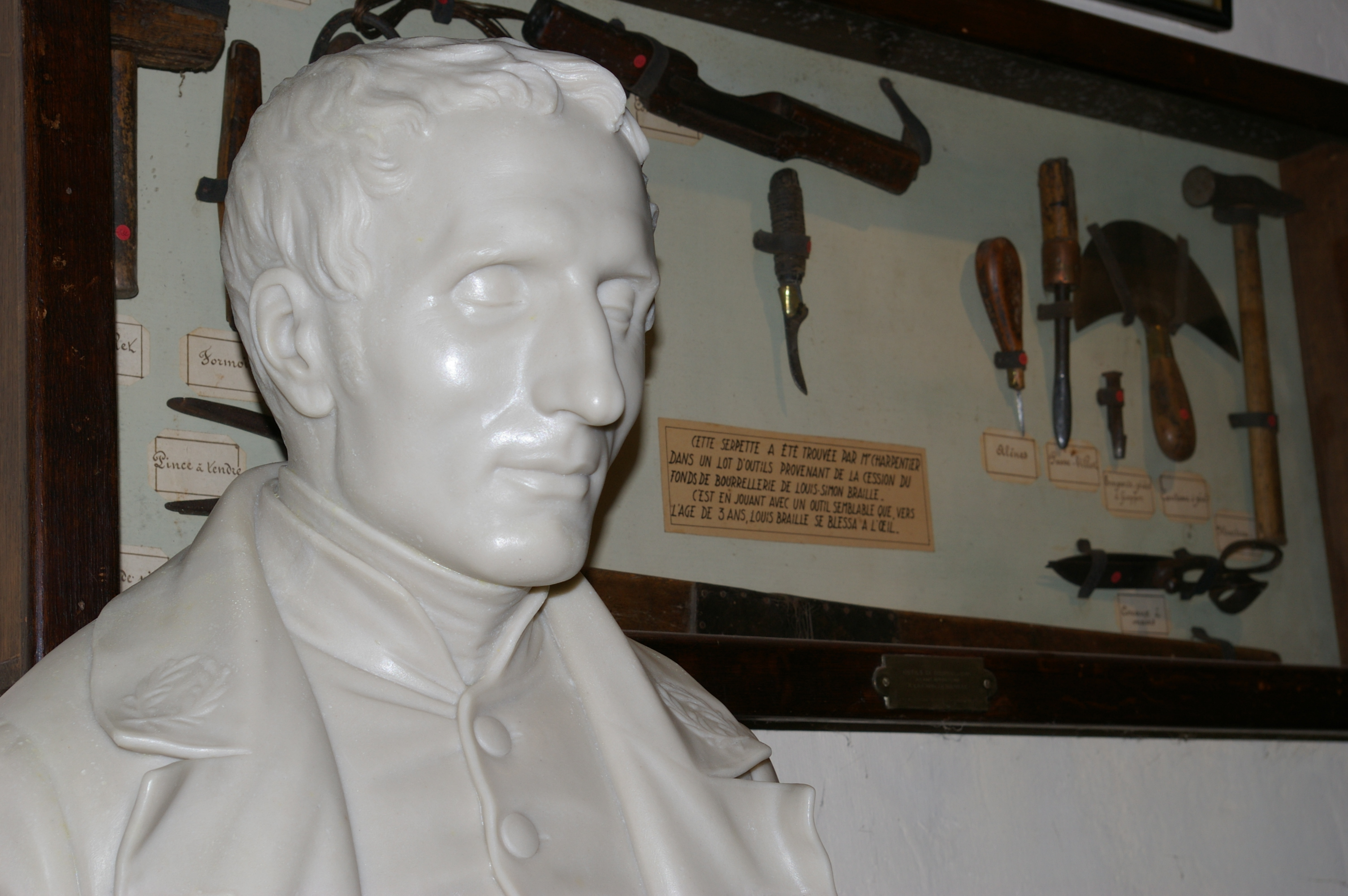
Bust and awl exhibit at the Louis Braille museum in Coupvray.

The children were taught to read using a system devised by the school's founder, Valentin Haüy. Not blind himself, Haüy was a philanthropist who devoted his life to helping the blind. He designed and manufactured a small library of books for the children by embossing heavy paper with the raised imprints of Latin letters. Readers would trace their fingers over the text, comprehending slowly but in a traditional fashion which Haüy could appreciate.

Braille was helped by Haüy's books, but he also despaired over their lack of depth: the amount of information retained in such books was necessarily minor. Because the raised letters were made in a complex artisanal process using wet paper pressed against copper wire, the children could not hope to "write" by themselves. So that the young Louis could send letters back home, Simon-René provided him with an alphabet made from bits of thick leather. It was a slow and cumbersome process, but the boy could at least trace the letters' outlines and write his first sentences.

The handcrafted Haüy books all came in uncomfortable sizes and weights for children. They were laboriously constructed, very fragile, and expensive to obtain: when Haüy's school first opened, it had a total of three books. Nonetheless, Haüy promoted their use with zeal. To him, the books presented a system which would be readily approved by educators and indeed they seemed – at the time – to offer the best achievable results. Braille and his schoolmates, however, could detect all too well the books' crushing limitations. Nonetheless, Haüy's efforts still provided a breakthrough achievement – the recognition of the sense of touch as a workable strategy for sightless reading. The Haüy system's main drawback, in the opinion of at least one author, was that it was "talking to the fingers with the language of the eye".

=== Teacher and musician ===
Braille read Haüy's books repeatedly, and he was equally attentive to the oral instruction offered by the school. He proved to be a highly proficient student and, after he had exhausted the school's curriculum, he was immediately asked to remain a teacher's aide. By 1833, he was elevated to a full professorship. For much of the rest of his life, Braille stayed at the Institute where he taught history, geometry, and algebra.

Braille's ear for music enabled him to become an accomplished cellist and organist in classes taught by Jean-Nicolas Marrigues. Later in life, his musical talents led him to play the organ for churches all over France. A devout Catholic, Braille held the position of organist in Paris at the Church of Saint-Nicolas-des-Champs. From 1834 to 1839, and later at the Church of Saint-Vincent-de-Paul.

== Braille system ==
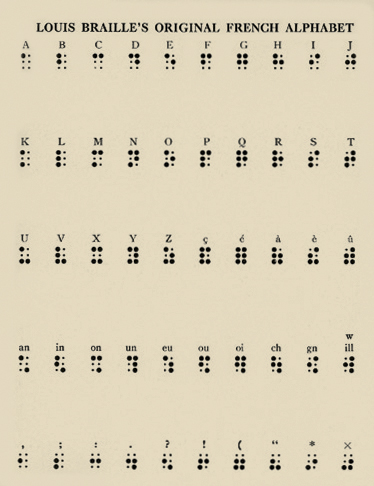
The first version of braille, composed for the French alphabet

=== Origins ===
In 1821, Braille learned of a communication system devised by Charles Barbier. Barbier, aware of its potential for helping the blind to read and write, wrote to the school to introduce his method. Barbier's invention was a code of up to twelve dots in two columns, impressed into thick paper. These impressions could be interpreted entirely by the fingers. Barbier's code of raised dots inspired Braille to develop a system of his own.

Braille was determined to invent a system of reading and writing that could bridge the gap in communication between the sighted and the blind. In his own words: "Access to communication in the widest sense is access to knowledge, and that is vitally important for us if we [the blind] are not to go on being despised or patronized by condescending sighted people. We do not need pity, nor do we need to be reminded we are vulnerable. We must be treated as equals – and communication is the way this can be brought about."

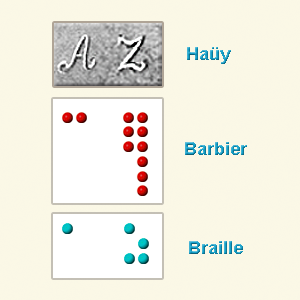
Three forms of the letters "A" and "Z"

=== Design ===
Braille reworked Barbier's system by simplifying its form and maximizing its efficiency. He made uniform columns for each letter, and reduced the maximum of twelve raised dots to six. His first version used both dots and dashes. He published this version in 1829, but by the second edition in 1837 discarded the dashes because they were too difficult to read. Crucially, Braille's smaller cells were capable of being recognized as letters with a single touch of a finger.

Braille created his own raised-dot system using Barbier's slate and stylus tools. Barbier had donated many sets of these tools to the school. By soldering metal strips across the slate, Braille created a secure area for the stylus which would keep the lines straight and readable.

By these modest means, Braille constructed a robust communication system. "It bears the stamp of genius," wrote Dr. Richard Slating French, former director of the California School for the Blind, "like the Roman alphabet itself".

=== Musical adaptation ===
The system was soon extended to include braille musical notation. Passionate about his own music, Braille took meticulous care in its planning to ensure that the musical code would be "flexible enough to meet the unique requirements of any instrument". In 1829, he published the first book about his system, Method of Writing Words, Music, and Plainsong by Means of Dots, for Use by the Blind and Arranged for Them. Ironically this book was first printed by the raised letter method of the Haüy system.

=== Publications ===
Braille produced several written works about braille and as general education for the blind. Method of Writing Words, Music, and Plainsong... (1829) was revised and republished in 1837; his mathematics guide, Little Synopsis of Arithmetic for Beginners, entered use in 1838; and his monograph New Method for Representing by Dots the Form of Letters, Maps, Geometric Figures, Musical Symbols, etc., for Use by the Blind was first published in 1839. Many of Braille's original printed works remain available at the Braille birthplace museum in Coupvray.

=== Decapoint ===
New Method for Representing by Dots... (1839) put forth Braille's plan for a new writing system with which blind people could write letters that could be read by sighted people. Called decapoint, the system combined his method of dot-punching with a new specialized grill which Braille devised to overlay the paper. When used with an associated number table (also designed by Braille and requiring memorization), the grill could permit a blind writer to faithfully reproduce the standard alphabet.

After the introduction of decapoint, Braille assisted his friend Pierre-François-Victor Foucault, who invented the Raphigraphe, a device that allowed for more rapid creation of letters made with raised points. Foucault's machine was hailed as a great success and was exhibited at the World's Fair in Paris in 1855. There is a decapoint slate and a raphigraphy on display at the Louis Braille museum.

== Later life ==
Dr. Alexandre-René Pignier, principal at the school, supported Braille's work and allowed the teaching of Braille's system. However, Pignier was forced out of his position in 1840 by an ambitious younger teacher, Pierre-Armand Dufau, who opposed the teaching of Braille at the school. Fortunately, another teacher, Joseph Guadet, supported Braille, and the system was reintroduced in 1844, at the time of the opening of a new school building on the Boulevard des Invalides.

Braille had always been a sickly child, and his condition worsened in adulthood. A persistent respiratory illness, long believed to be tuberculosis, dogged him. Despite the lack of a cure at the time, Braille lived with the illness for 16 years. By the age of 40, he was forced to relinquish his position as a teacher. When his condition reached mortal danger, he was admitted to the infirmary at the Royal Institution, where he died in 1852, two days after he turned 43.

== Legacy ==
Because of the overwhelming insistence of the blind pupils, Braille's system was finally adopted by the Institute in 1854, two years after his death. The system spread throughout the French-speaking world, but was slower to expand in other places. However, by the time of the first all-European conference of teachers of the blind in 1873, the cause of braille was championed by Dr. Thomas Rhodes Armitage and thereafter its international use increased rapidly. By 1882, Dr. Armitage was able to report that "There is now probably no institution in the civilized world where braille is not used except in some of those in North America." Eventually even these holdouts relented: braille was officially adopted by schools for the blind in the United States in 1916, and a universal braille code for English was formalized in 1932.

New variations in braille technology have emerged, including braille computer terminals, RoboBraille email delivery service, and Nemeth Braille, which is a system used for mathematical and scientific notation. Nearly two centuries after its invention, braille remains a system of utility.

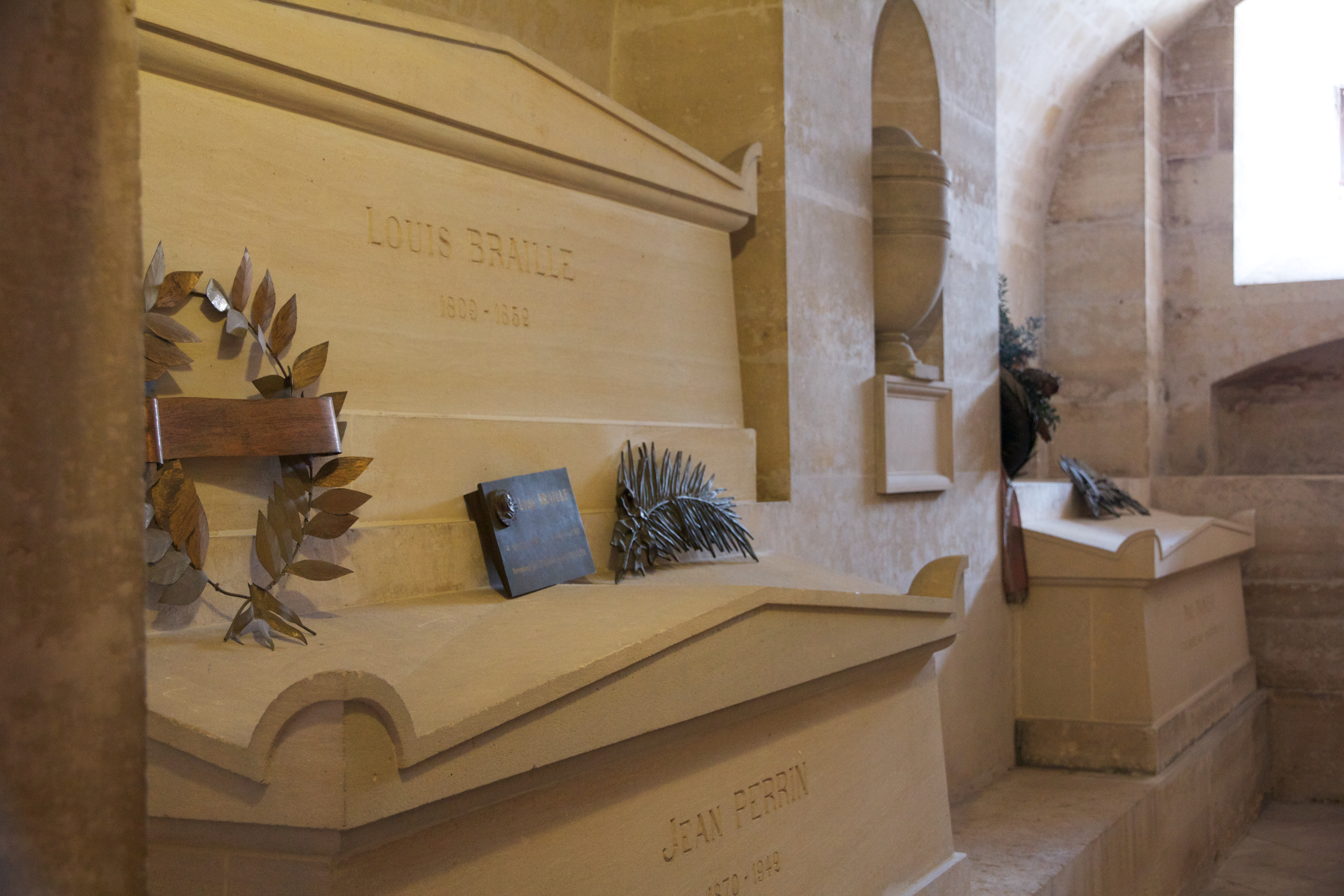
Tomb of Louis Braille, above that of Jean Perrin

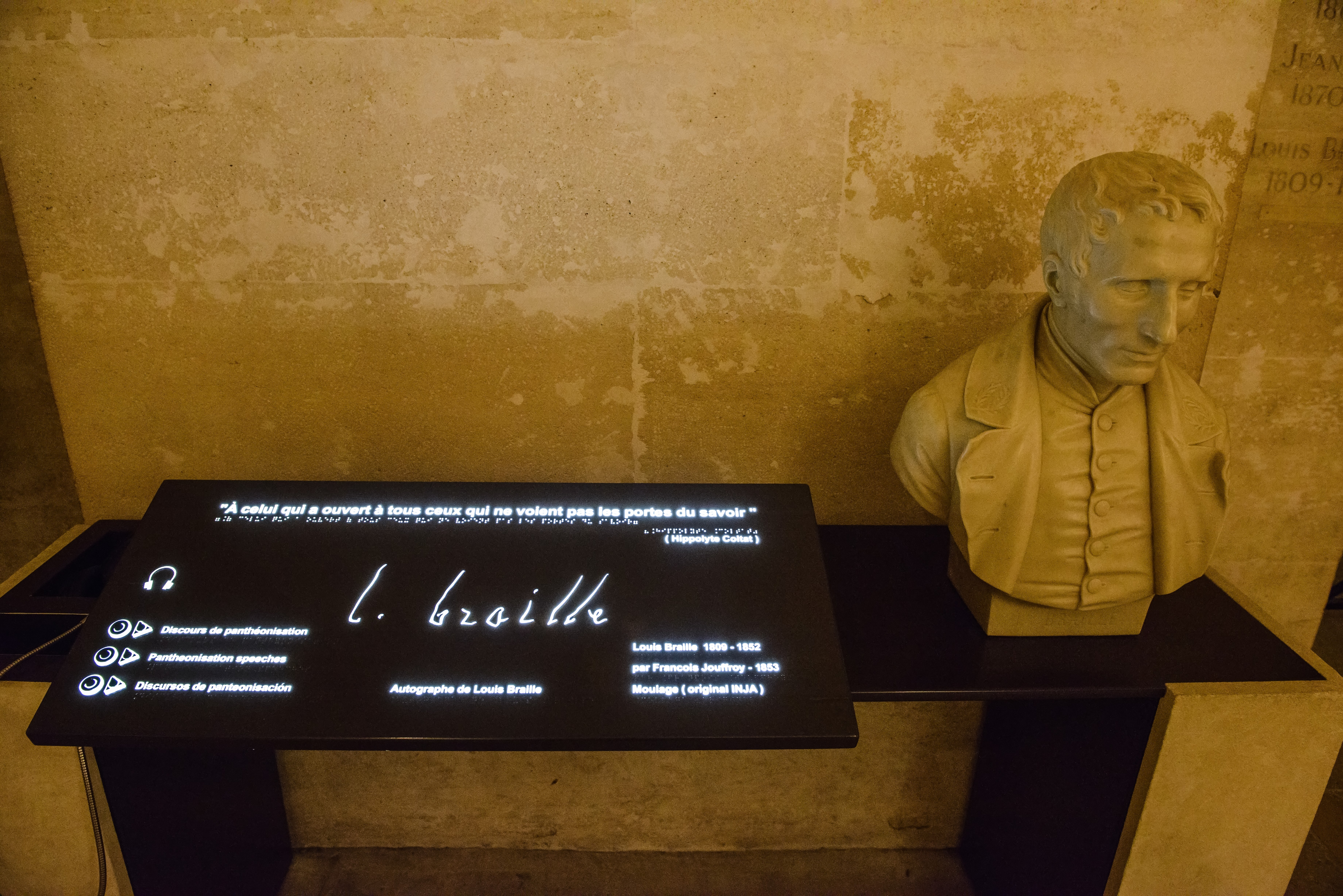
Braille's memorial in the Panthéon

=== Honors and tributes ===
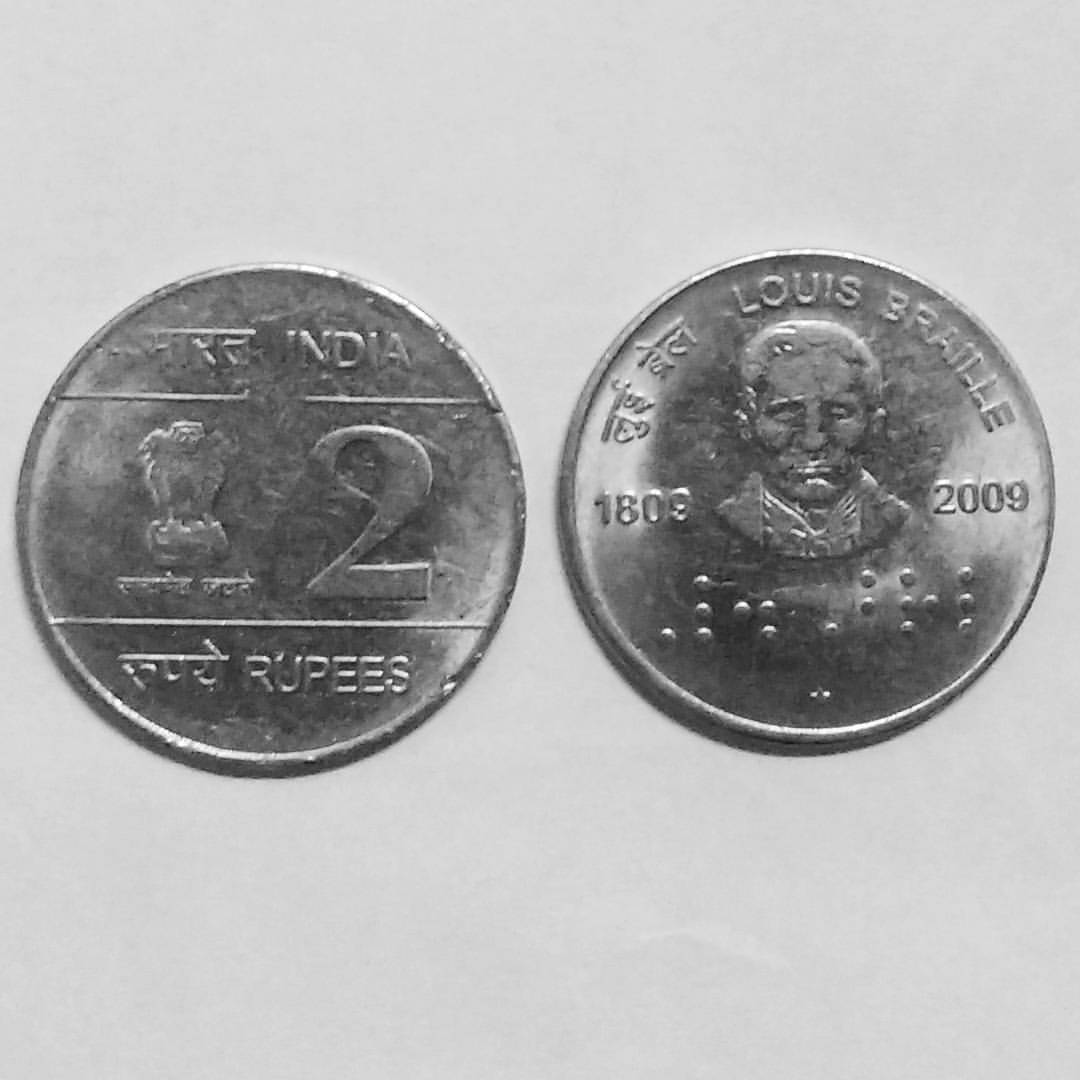
An Indian two rupee coin minted in honour of Louis Braille's 200th birth anniversary (1809–2009)

The immense personal legacy of Louis Braille was described in a 1952 essay by T. S. Eliot:

Perhaps the most enduring honor to the memory of Louis Braille is the half-conscious honor we pay him by applying his name to the script he invented – and, in this country [England], adapting the pronunciation of his name to our own language. We honor Braille when we speak of braille. His memory has in this way a security greater than that of the memories of many men more famous in their day.

Braille's childhood home in Coupvray is a listed historic building and houses the Louis Braille museum, which contains a portrait miniature of him by Lucienne Filippi. A large monument to him was erected in the town square which was itself renamed Braille Square. On the centenary of his death, his remains were moved to the Panthéon in Paris. In a symbolic gesture, Braille's hands were left in Coupvray, reverently buried near his home.

Statues and other memorials to Louis Braille can be found around the world. He has been commemorated in postage stamps worldwide, and the asteroid 9969 Braille was named for him in 1992. The Encyclopædia Britannica lists him among the "100 Most Influential Inventors Of All Time".

A Google Doodle for Louis Braille's 197th birthday in 2006 was shown on Google's homepage, spelling "Google" in braille.

The 200th anniversary of Braille's birth in 2009 was celebrated throughout the world by exhibitions and symposiums about his life and achievements. Among the commemorations, Belgium and Italy struck 2-euro coins, India released a set of two commemorative coins (Rs 100 and Rs 2), and the USA struck a one dollar coin, all in Braille's honor.

World Braille Day is celebrated every year on Braille's birthday, 4 January, since 2019.

=== In popular culture ===
Because of his accomplishments as a young boy, Braille holds a special place as a hero for children, and he has been the subject of a large number of works of juvenile literature. Other appearances in the arts include the American TV special Young Heroes: Louis Braille (2010); the French TV movie Une lumière dans la nuit (2008) (A light in the night released in English as The Secret of Braille); and the dramatic play Braille: The Early Life of Louis Braille (1989) by Lola and Coleman Jennings. In music, Braille's life was subject of the song Merci, Louis, composed by the Halifax singer-songwriter Terry Kelly, chair of the Canadian Braille Literacy Foundation. The Braille Legacy, a musical which tells the story of Louis Braille, directed by Thom Southerland and starring Jérôme Pradon, debuted at the Charing Cross Theatre in April 2017.

== Bibliography ==
- Bickel, Lennard (1989). Triumph Over Darkness: The Life of Louis Braille. Leicester: Ulverscroft. ISBN 978-0708920046. (also large print)
- Farrell, Gabriel (1956). The Story of Blindness. Cambridge: Harvard University Press. OCLC 263655.
- Kugelmass, J. Alvin (1951). Louis Braille: Windows for the Blind. New York: Julian Messner Inc. OCLC 8989771.
- Lorimer, Pamela (1996). A critical evaluation of the historical development of the tactile modes of reading and analysis and evaluation of researches carried out in endeavours to make the braille code easier to read and to write (Ph. D. thesis). University of Birmingham. OCLC 49619181. Archived from the original on 30 March 2012.
- Olstrom, Clifford E. (10 July 2012). Undaunted By Blindness. Watertown, MA: Perkins School for the Blind. ISBN 978-0-9822721-9-0.
- Reynolds, Cecil R.; Fletcher-Janzen, Elaine (2007). Encyclopedia of Special Education: A-D. John Wiley and Sons. ISBN 978-0-471-67798-7.
- Mellor, C. Michael (2006). Louis Braille: A Touch of Genius. Boston: National Braille Press. ISBN 978-0-939173-70-9.
- Weygand, Zina (2009). The Blind in French Society: From the Middle Ages to the century of Louis Braille. Stanford, CA: Stanford University Press. ISBN 978-0-8047-5768-3.
