= May Harrison (philanthropist) =

Australilan educator of the blind

Mary Ann 'May' Harrison
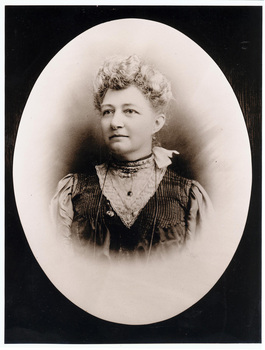
- Died: 1912; Victoria, Australia
- Occupations: Philanthropist, educator and librarian
- Known for: Founding Victoria's First Braille Library
- Relatives: Minnie Crabb

Mary Ann 'May' Harrison (died 1912) was a founder of the Victorian Association of Braille Writers and the Victorian Braille Library.

== Career ==
In 1894, Harrison became acquainted with blind advocate, Tilly Aston, and was inspired to help create a library for the blind in Victoria, Australia. Before this, there were no Braille books obtainable in the state of Victoria. Other people involved in the library formation, were Miss Blakely, Mr. W. H. MacLeiman, and Mr. W. Mitchell after awareness of the lack of resources for the blind was raised at a public meeting held at the Prahran Town Hall, Melbourne in the same year.

The Library began with just eight braille copies of Oliver Twist, but by 1926 had grown to over 10,000 volumes. Aston and Harrison volunteered to teach braille to anyone who wanted to learn it. Aston was to act as instructor, reviser and proof reader of braille books transcribed by volunteers from the Victorian Association of Braille Writers, while Harrison undertook the secretarial duties and volunteer coordination. Harrison also acted as librarian, opening her own home to volunteers and readers of the Library's fast filling shelves, which were housed in a room of her home.

In 1907, Harrison devised a simple system for teaching braille transcription to the volunteers, and she published a braille contractions sheet to enable beginners to understand the system at a glance. At the time, all transcription were made by hand using a slate and stylus.

Under Harrison's librarianship, the Braille Library included works of history, biography, fiction, poetry, travel, educational, religious works, children's books, Catholic prayer-books, Catholic Truth Society pamphlets, as well as a few volumes in Esperanto and other languages (Harrison being an enthusiast of the Esperanto language).

Harrison was employed as the first Librarian of the Braille Library from 1894 until her death in 1912, and is buried St Kilda Cemetery.

== Legacy ==
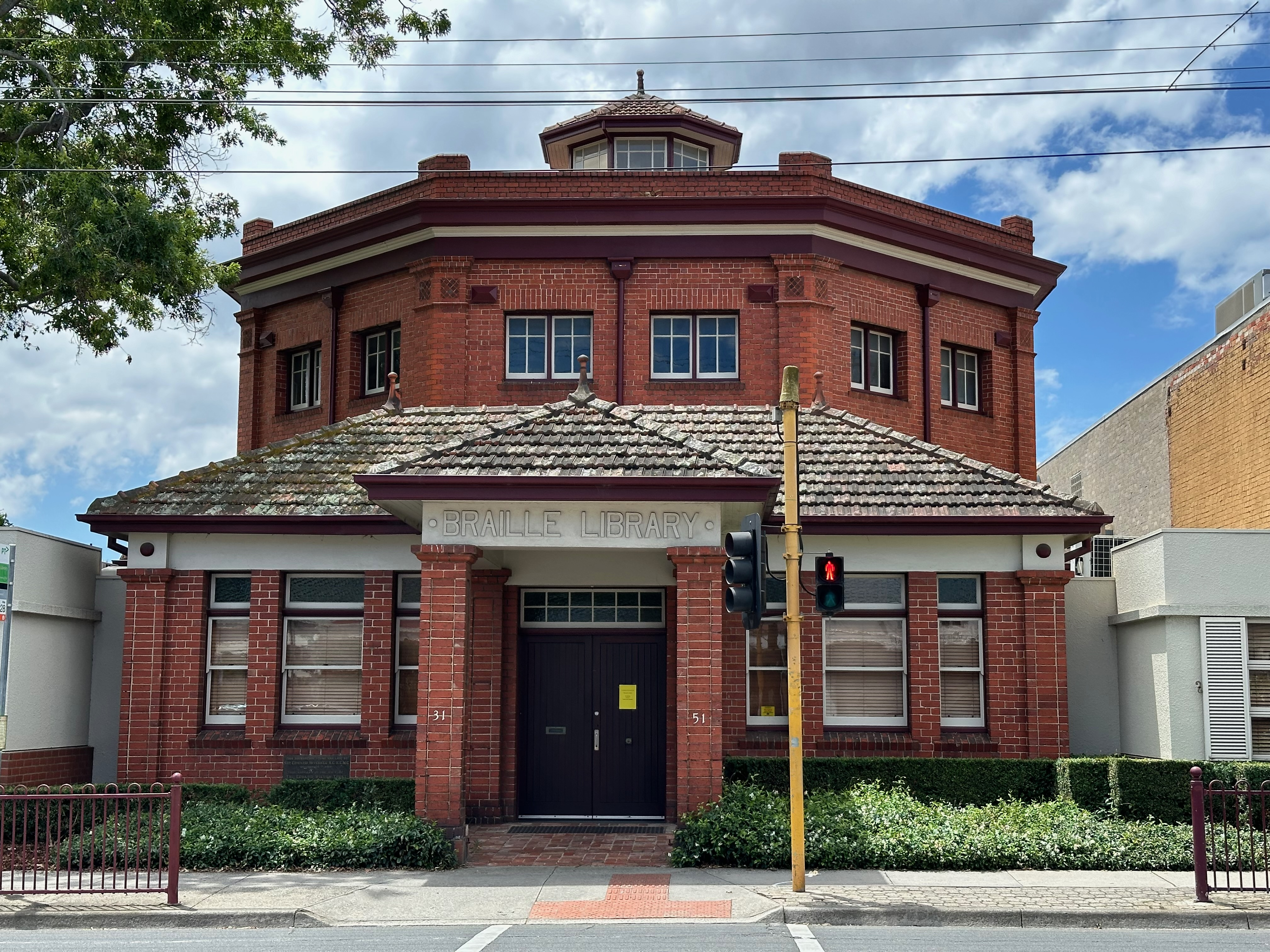
The Braille Library on Commercial Road, South Yarra.

A purpose-built Library was constructed on Commercial Street, South Yarra, Melbourne, Victoria in 1918, to house the growing collection of the Victorian Association of Braille Writer's. The funds for the building were obtained from the Edward Wilson Trust, who donated funds to benefit injured and blinded returned soldiers. The Library had coconut matting on the floor and commissioned two stained glass windows to commemorate the birth of Louis Braille's birth in 1929 for the benefit of their low vision patrons.

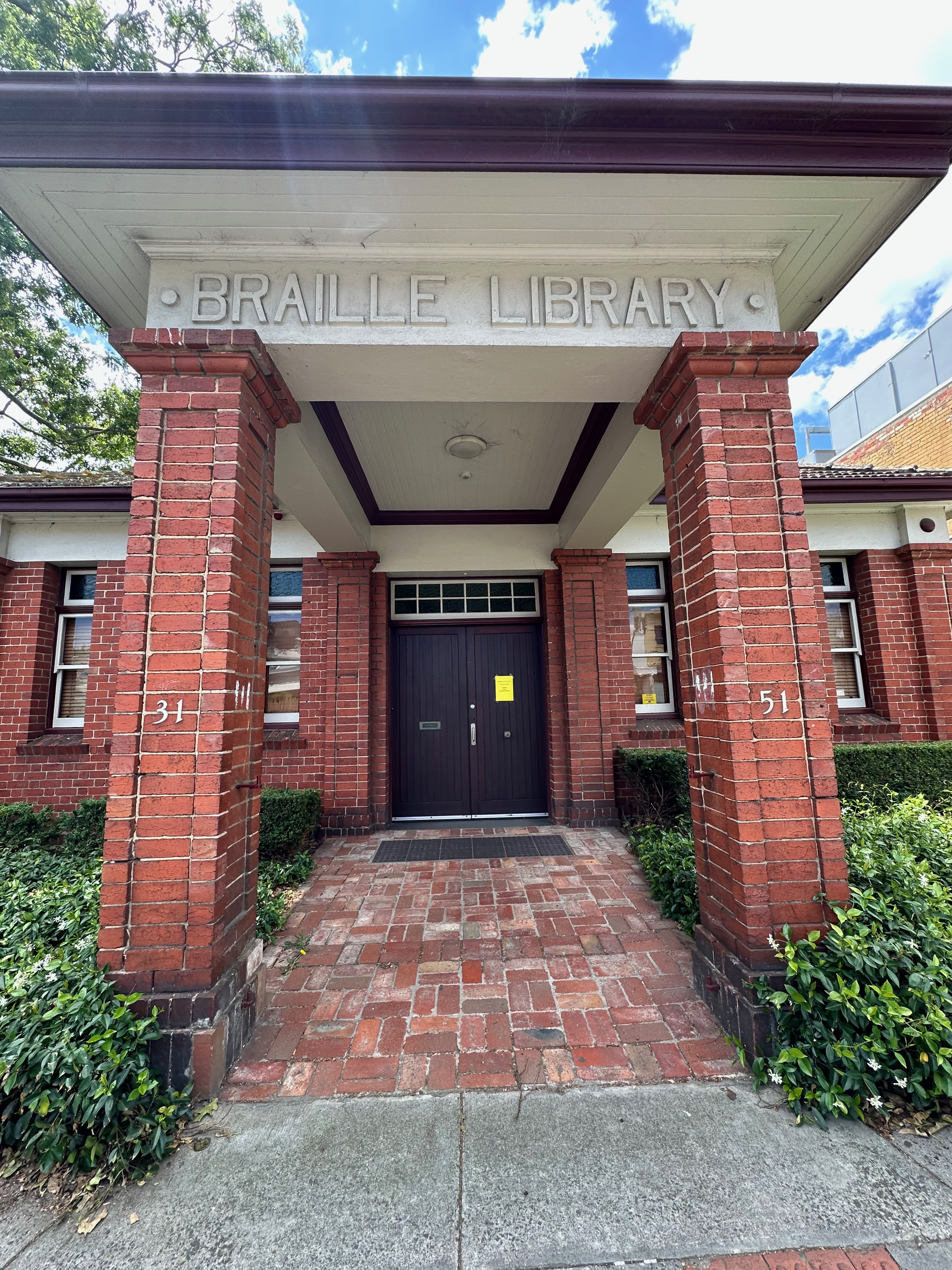
Entryway of the Victorian Braille Library

When it was opened in 1918, the library was described in a newspaper of the time as:

The library can be aptly described as a handsome and lofty structure. The main portion is octagonal in shape, and quite majestic in appearance. Visitors who have seen the interior are charmed with it, and invariably describe it as lovely. It is lighted from a cupola at the summit, which has circular windows. Around the hall is a gallery with shelves for the library books. There are offices for the officials and a reading room for the blind. Every modern convenience has been applied in the erection of the building, and up to date heating and ventilating appliances have likewise been affixed. In fact, nothing has been left undone that would in the slightest degree tend to the comfort of those for whom the building has been specially erected.

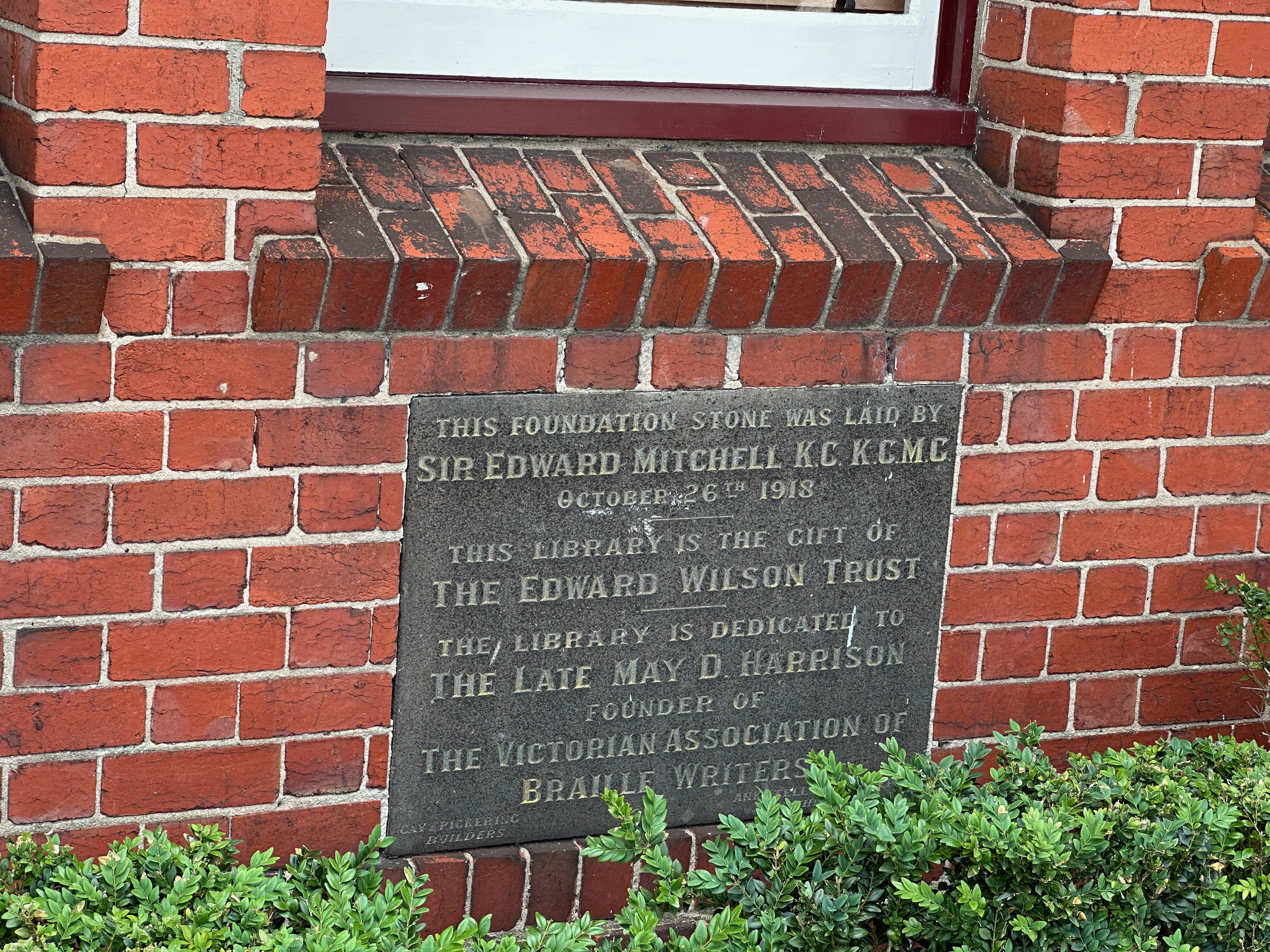
Victorian Braille Library foundation stone

A foundation stone and plaque for the Library was laid by Edward Fancourt Mitchell on 26 October 1918, and was dedicated to May Harrison. It was inscribed:

She was eyes to the Blind. In loving memory of MAY D. HARRISON. Fell asleep on 2nd October, 1912. Was the principal founder of this library, and as hon. secretary and librarian devoted over 18 years of her life to the work of the Victorian Association of Braille Writers. Erected by co-workers and blind friends.

She gave her life to the work, and at her death left behind a well-established institution of voluntary Braille writers, and one of the largest braille libraries in the southern hemisphere

Harrison's niece, Minnie Crabb, was to take over as Librarian for the Braille Library years later, and invented the first Australian Braille Printing Press in 1934. By the time of Crabb's own retirement in 1944, the library had grown to become the third-largest Braille library in the world and the only public free lending library for the blind in Victoria.

== Publications ==
Drake-Harrison, May. Braille Contraction Chart and Key to Contractions. 18 June 1907.

== Recognition ==
Harrison is recognised for her contributions on the Australian Braille Authority's Australian Braille Honour Roll.
