= Lucienne Filippi =

French painter (1928–2023)

Self-portrait by Lucienne Filippi, 1946

Lucienne Filippi (23 July 1928 – 2023) was a French painter born in Mandelieu-la-Napoule. She taught art at Bry-sur-Marne and Villiers-sur-Marne, where she lived and worked. The Benezit Dictionary of Artists said of her output:

Floral compositions are her preferred theme, but she has also treated landscapes, provincial life scenes and the Guinguettes, modest restaurants with music and dancing on the Marne riverside. She has produced meticulous renderings of scenes from the French Revolution, as well as some miniature portraits.

Filippi created the painting which hangs at the Villiers wedding hall in 1952, when she was 24. Her portrait miniature of Louis Braille from 1966 is located in the bedroom of his birthplace and museum. She died in 2023.
