= Minnie Crabb =

Australian inventor and librarian

- Born: 1885; Victoria, Australia
- Died: 1974 (aged 88–89)
- Occupations: Librarian, inventor
- Known for: Inventing a Braille Printing Press for vision-impaired people
- Relatives: May Harrison

Minnie Crabb (1885 — 1974) was the inventor of the Crabb-Hulme Braille printing press, the first Australian braille printing press. Her work was instrumental in braille accessibility and production in Australia.

Crabb served as the librarian of the Braille Library in South Yarra (later the Vision Australia Foundation) for 37 years, concurrently holding the position of assistant-secretary for the Victorian Association of Braille Writers. She retired from these roles in March 1944. It was during this time that she invented what was believed to be the only braille printing press in the Southern Hemisphere.

== Career ==
Crabb began working at the Braille Library in South Yarra during its early stages after she left school. At that time, the Library was operating from private rooms in her aunt May Harrison's home. Books and equipment were limited. Along with Tilly Aston, Harrison was pivotal in the founding of the Braille Library in South Yarra when it was established in 1894 and was its first secretary. Prior to the Library's establishment, braille was unavailable in Victoria.

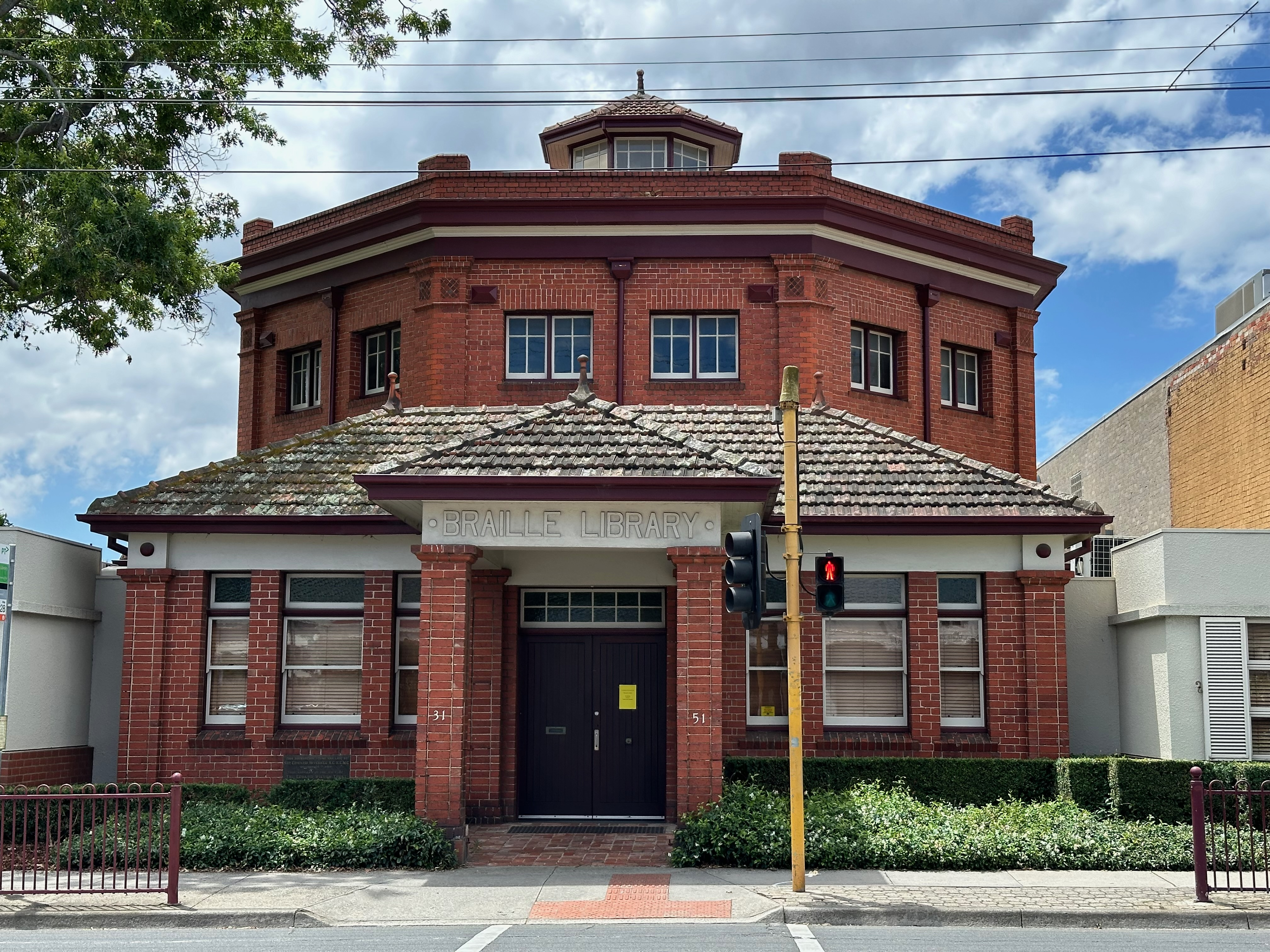
The Victorian Braille Library on Commercial Road, South Yarra, Melbourne, Victoria, Australia.

Initially serving as her aunt's assistant, Crabb gradually took on roles such as assistant librarian for the Braille Library and assistant secretary for the Victorian Association of Braille Writers. Following her aunt's passing in 1912, Crabb assumed the positions of chief librarian and secretary. Under her leadership, she assembled a team of over 100 volunteer transcribers, ensuring that braille literature could be readily borrowed by readers across Australia. In 1918 the Victorian Braille Library was moved to a purpose-built Library building in South Yarra, Melbourne Victoria.

In 1934 Crabb, in partnership with Mr. H. Hulme of the Sentinel Engineering Works, invented a braille printing press (a form of Braille embosser) for the vision impaired. The machine expanded the possibilities for rapidly delivering information to Australian Braille readers when the cost of importing a printing machine was impractical due to high costs. The Library's catalogues, newsletters and monthly magazine (The Social Letter) could now be rapidly produced and duplicated instead of each catalogue and copy of the monthly Braille magazine being written separately. The only machine of its kind in the world, it was of steel and cast iron construction with two wheels on left hand side and two foot levers to operate a wheel on the right hand side. It was described in one newspaper as being "worked with foot pedals and a handle similar to a sewing machine, whilst the paper is guided by a folder and an arrangement of clips enables both sides of the paper to be printed". It also revolutionised the production of braille at the time by not only allowing for mass duplication when hand printing was the norm, but printing on both sides of a page. This significantly decreased the expenses related to storage and production.

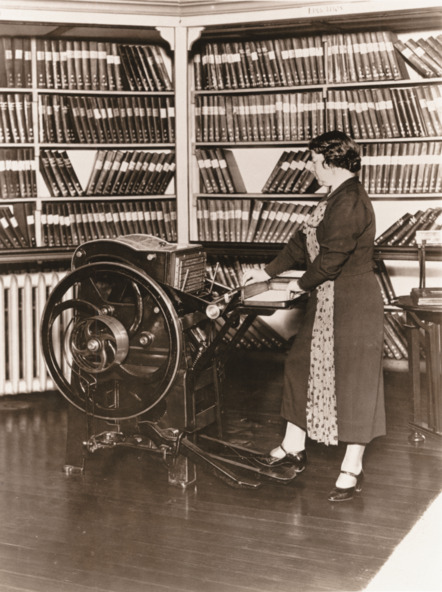
Minnie Crabb operating the Crabb-Hulme Braille printing press in 1934

The machine was publicly demonstrated in 1934 at the Housewives' Exhibition in the Melbourne Town Hall as part of an exhibition of Australian inventions and labor-saving devices. The press remained in use at the Braille Library until the 1970s. It is now on display at the Vision Australia head office in Kooyong, Victoria, after having been restored to full working order in 2001.

In February 1937 Hobart, Tasmania, the National Health and Medical Research Council held an Australian conference of representatives of Blind Institutions, the first of its kind in since 1920. At this conference Crabb advocated for the prevention of blindness in the home, school, and factories, as well as the rights for low vision people to have the same access to higher education opportunities as sighted people. She was particularly passionate about careers for low vision people in music, broadcasting, lecturing and industrial education.

By the time of Crabb's retirement in 1944 the library had grown to become the third-largest Braille library in the world and the only public free lending library for the blind in Victoria. It was estimated to have more than 16,000 books in the collection, with over 15,200 volumes actively circulating on loan throughout the Commonwealth in 1944 alone.

== Personal life ==
Minnie Crabb was the daughter of James Hall Crabb, the owner of the Prahran Telegraph, a Weekly newspaper published from 1860 to 1930 in Prahran, Melbourne, Australia.

== Published works ==
Crabb, Minnie H & Victorian Association of Braille Writers. 1924, Braille text book : a simple system of embossing books for the blind. Grade 2 / by Minnie H. Crabb. Victorian Association of Braille Writers, Melbourne

== Recognition ==
Crabb is recognised for her contributions on the Australian Braille Authority's Australian Braille Honour Roll.
