= Musée Louis Braille =

Museum on the invention of Braille

Louis Braille Museum
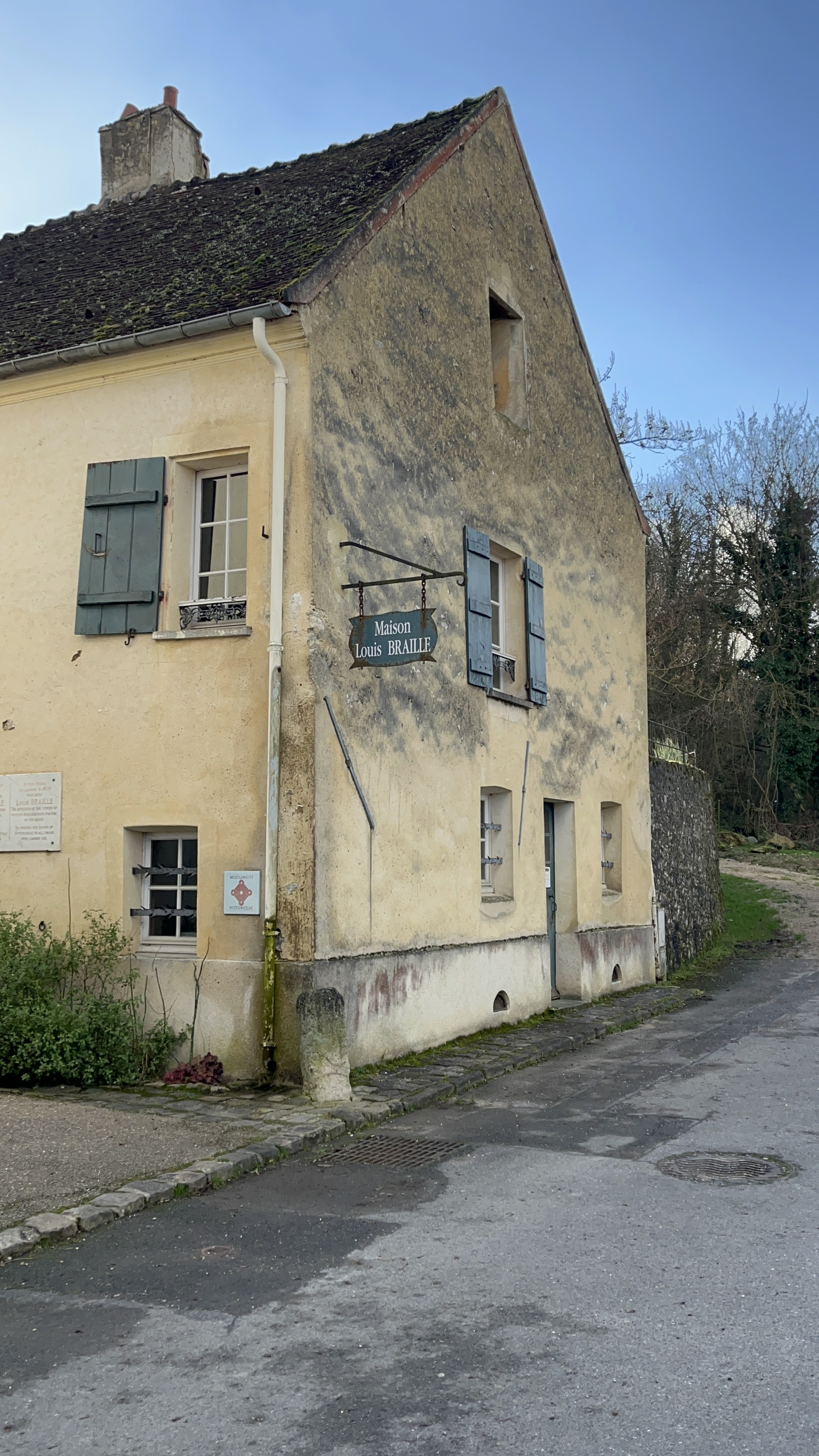
- Established: 1953
- Type: braille history museum, historic site
- Location: 13 Rue Louis Braille, 77700 Coupvray, France
- Coordinates: 48°53′40.4″N 2°47′31.9″E
- Website: museelouisbraille.com

Louis Braille Museum (French: Musée Louis Braille) is a museum created in the house in which Louis Braille, the inventor of braille and decapoint, was born. Braille (1809–1852) was a blind inventor, teacher, and professional musician.

Braille was originally invented as a code for the French alphabet. Today, braille code can be used for 133 languages as well as to write mathematics and music.

The museum includes about 1,000 artifacts, from pre-braille tactile reading methods to electronic braille displays to items once owned by the renowned inventor and his family. The historic building also recreates life in the 1800s in rural France.

== Location ==
The Louis Braille museum is located near Disneyland Paris, 21 miles (35 km) east of Paris, in the village of Coupvray, in the Seine-et-Marne department of the Île-de-France region. Louis Braille museum has been declared a Historic Monument, thus protecting Braille's home and the surrounding garden.

== Invention of Braille ==
At age 12, Louis Braille was introduced to Charles Barbier's raised-point writing method. Over the next 15 years, Braille simplified and refined his own tactile reading and writing method. Braille developed his tactile code while visiting his family in Coupvray, and while attending and later working at Royal Institute for Blind Youth (now called National Institute for Blind Youth) in Paris. In 1837, when he was 28, Braille published his second book, explaining his tactile reading and writing method. This second book is the basis for braille codes around the world.

It was in the village of Coupvray that Braille lost his eyesight. Three-year-old Louis Braille was playing unsupervised in his father's saddleshop and he accidentally stabbed himself in the eye with a curved knife. Over the next two years his vision diminished in both eyes, leaving him without light perception. The museum includes a recreation of Simon-Rene's saddleshop, including some of the original leather working tools.

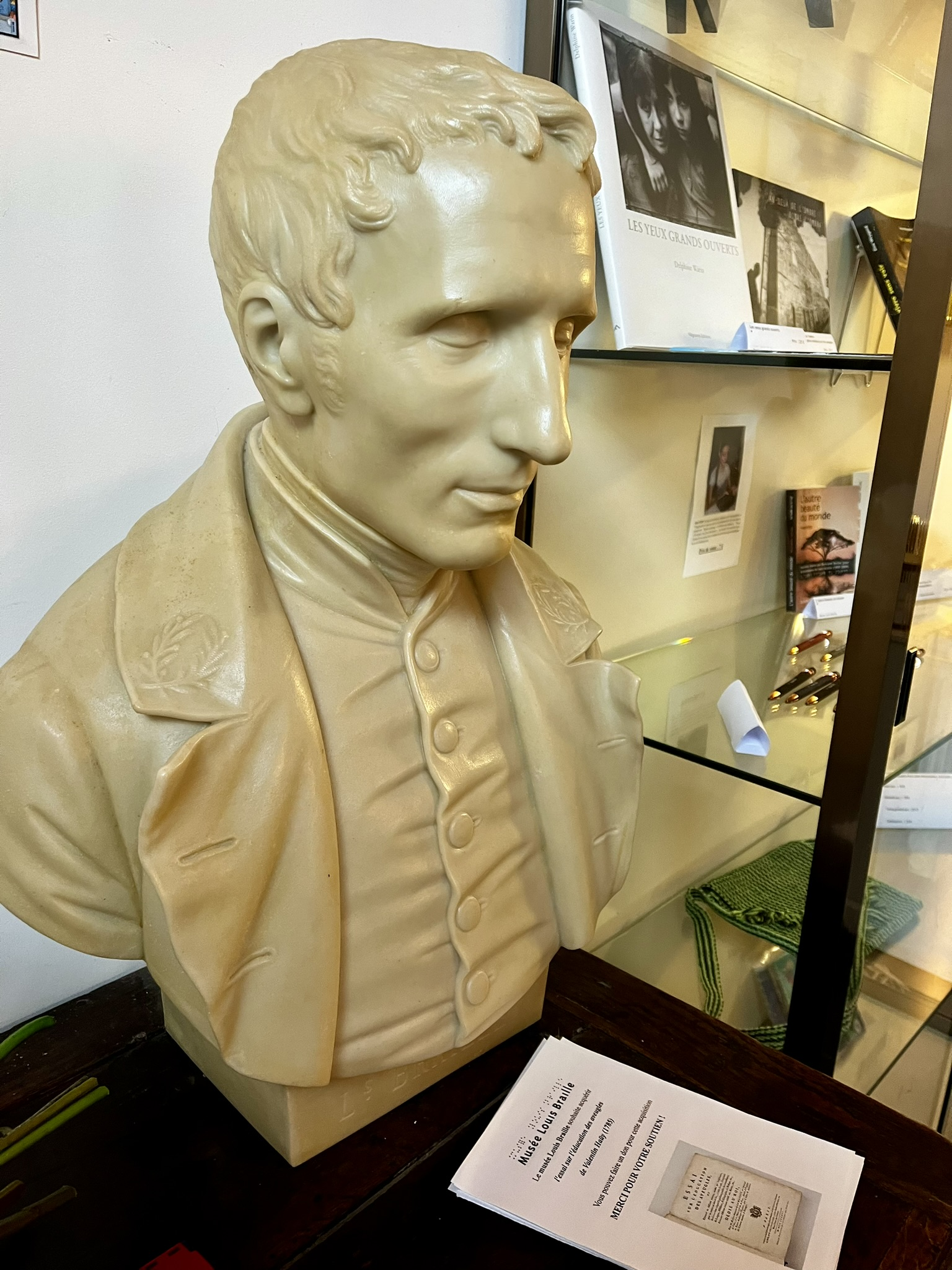
Louis Braille bust

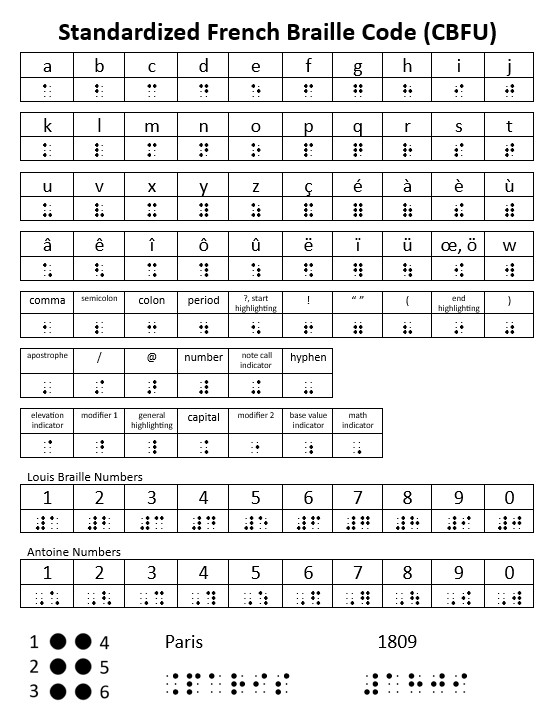
Standardized French Braille Code

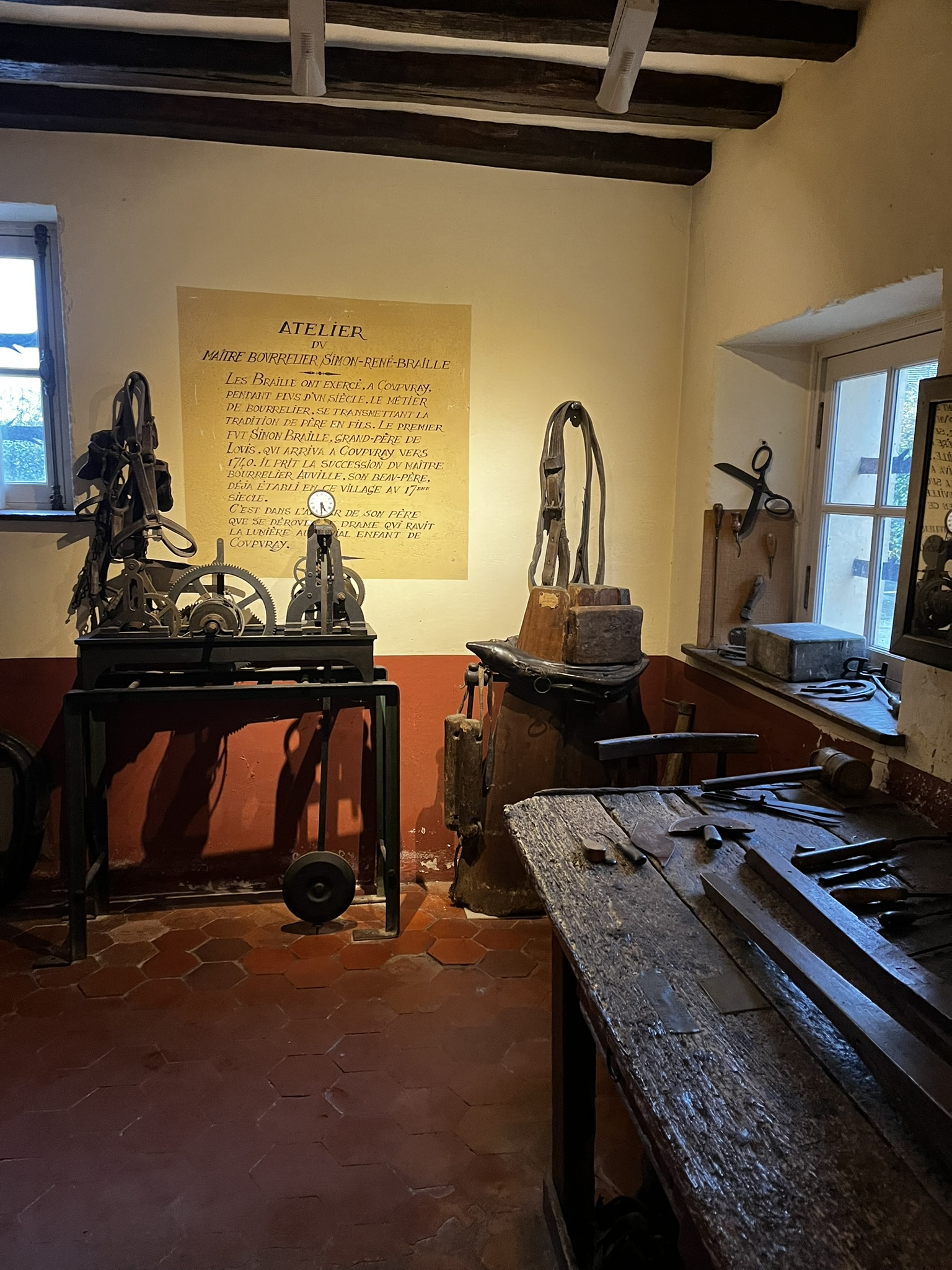
Simon-Réné Braille's saddleshop

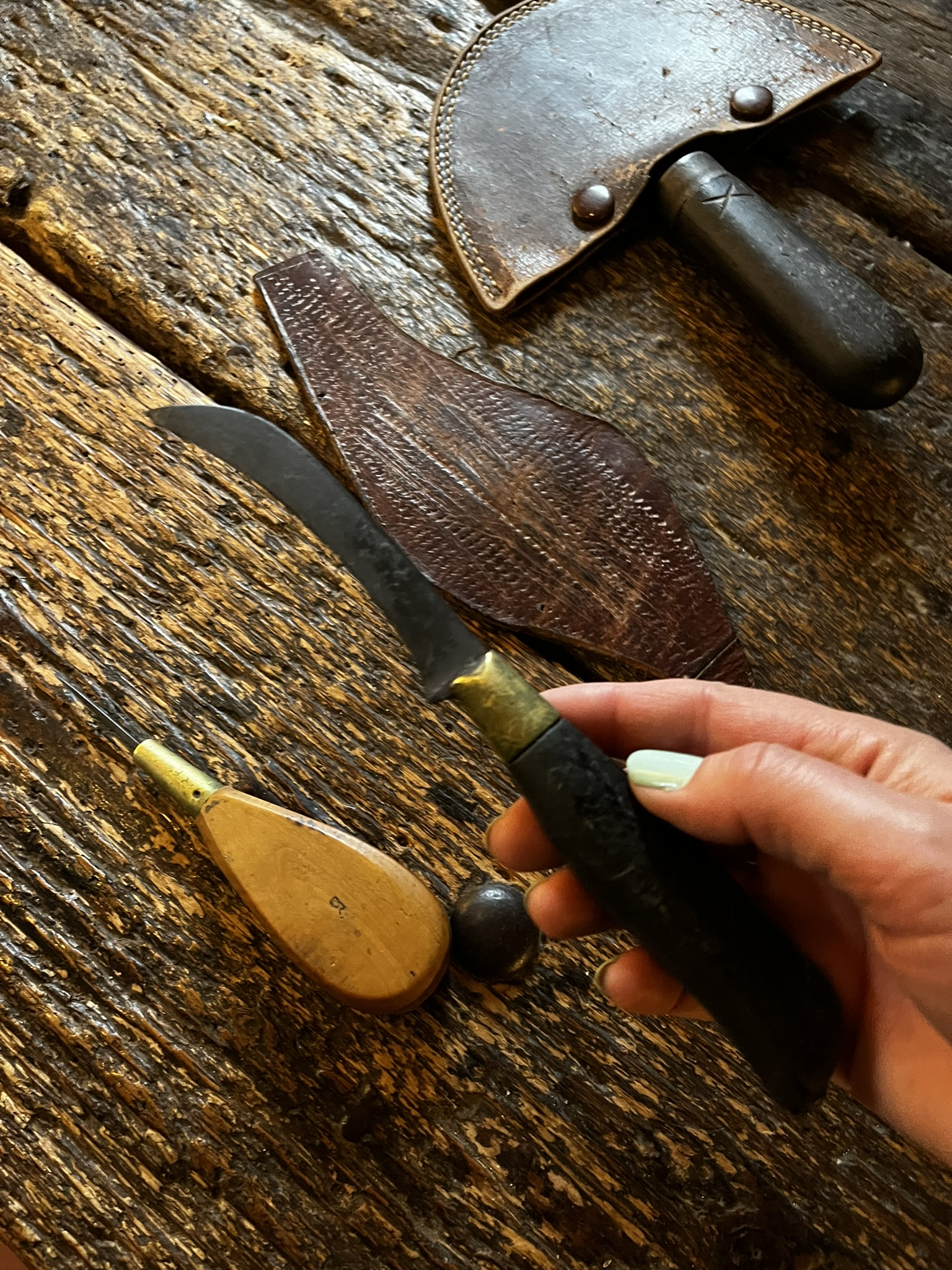
Harness maker's knife

== History ==
Louis Braille's three-story home, built in the 1750s, reflects the traditional style common to the Brie region. Rooms of note are the recreated saddleshop where Braille's accident occurred, the main living quarters where Monique Braille baked bread for the family of five, and Louis Braille's bedroom that now displays braille books, braille slates and braillewriters, along with other braille-related artifacts.

Originally, the Braille family owned three hectares, where the family lived and Simon-René worked as a master saddlemaker. Ownership of the main house changed several times until it was purchased by the Association of the Friends of Louis Braille (Les amis de Louis Braille) in 1952. Fundraising and renovations took place before the museum was opened two years later, spearheaded by Jean Roblin (1921–1993), the museum's first curator.

In 1952, to honor the 100th anniversary of Braille's death, Louis Braille was buried in the Panthéon in Paris. Braille's hands were left as relics in the Coupvray cemetery, while the rest of his body rests in Paris. In preparation for the 200th anniversary of Braille's death, the museum underwent more renovations. At that time, the World Blind Union and French Louis Braille Committee took over managing the museum; the building is owned by the commune (municipality) of Coupvray.

In the late 1980s, the North America/Caribbean Region of the World Blind Union raised $30,000 and donated it to the Louis Braille museum, under the leadership of Dr. Euclid Herie, Managing Director of the Canadian National Institute for the Blind.

In 1994, Dr. Kenneth Jernigan, from the National Federation of the Blind, flew from the United States to France to hand deliver a check for the Louis Braille museum. The National Federation of the Blind donated $26,000 to the museum.

December 2024, the Louis Braille museum was awarded 50,000 euros from the Heritage Lottery to support its restoration.

== Highlights from the collection ==
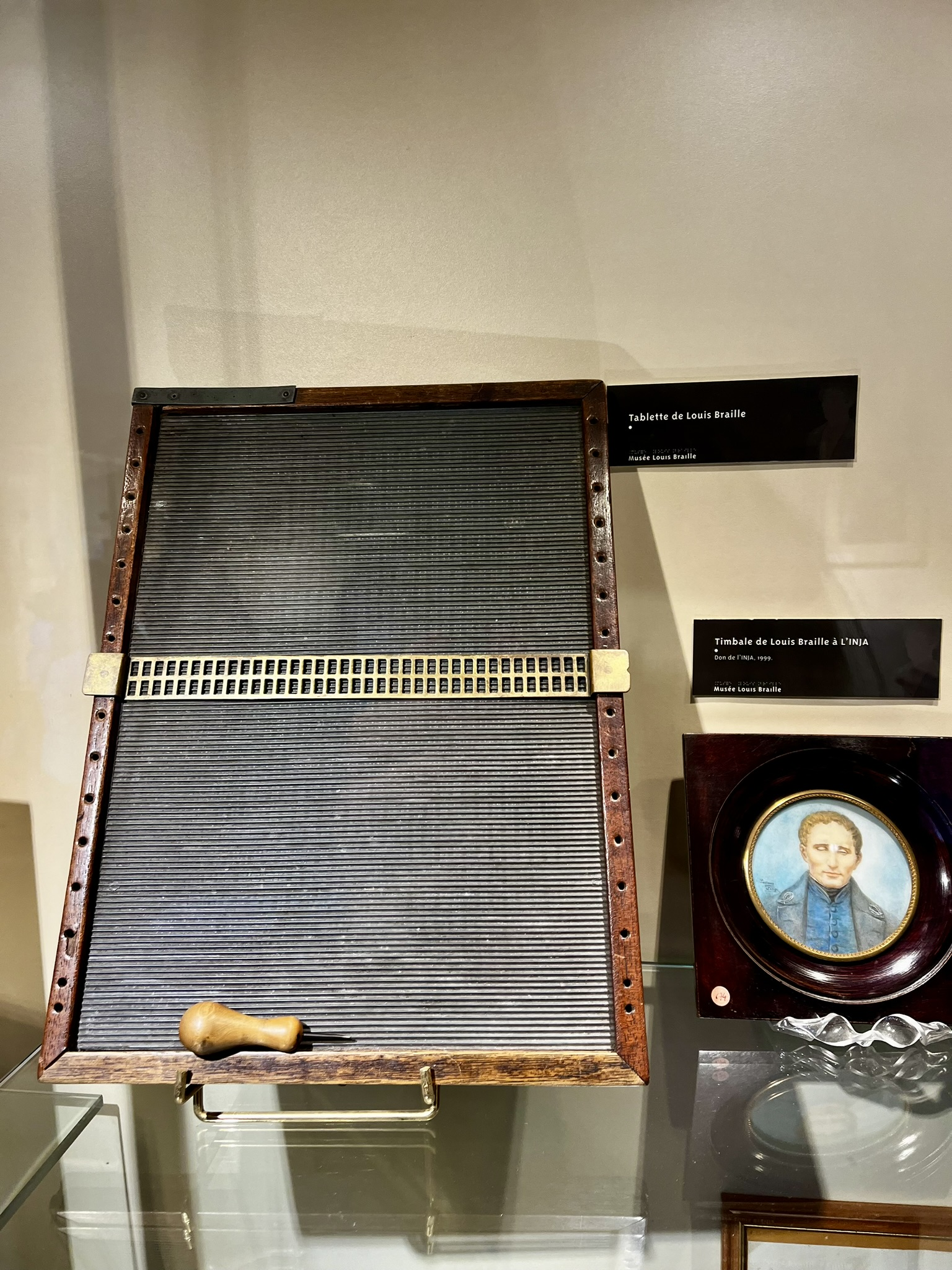
Louis Braille's slate

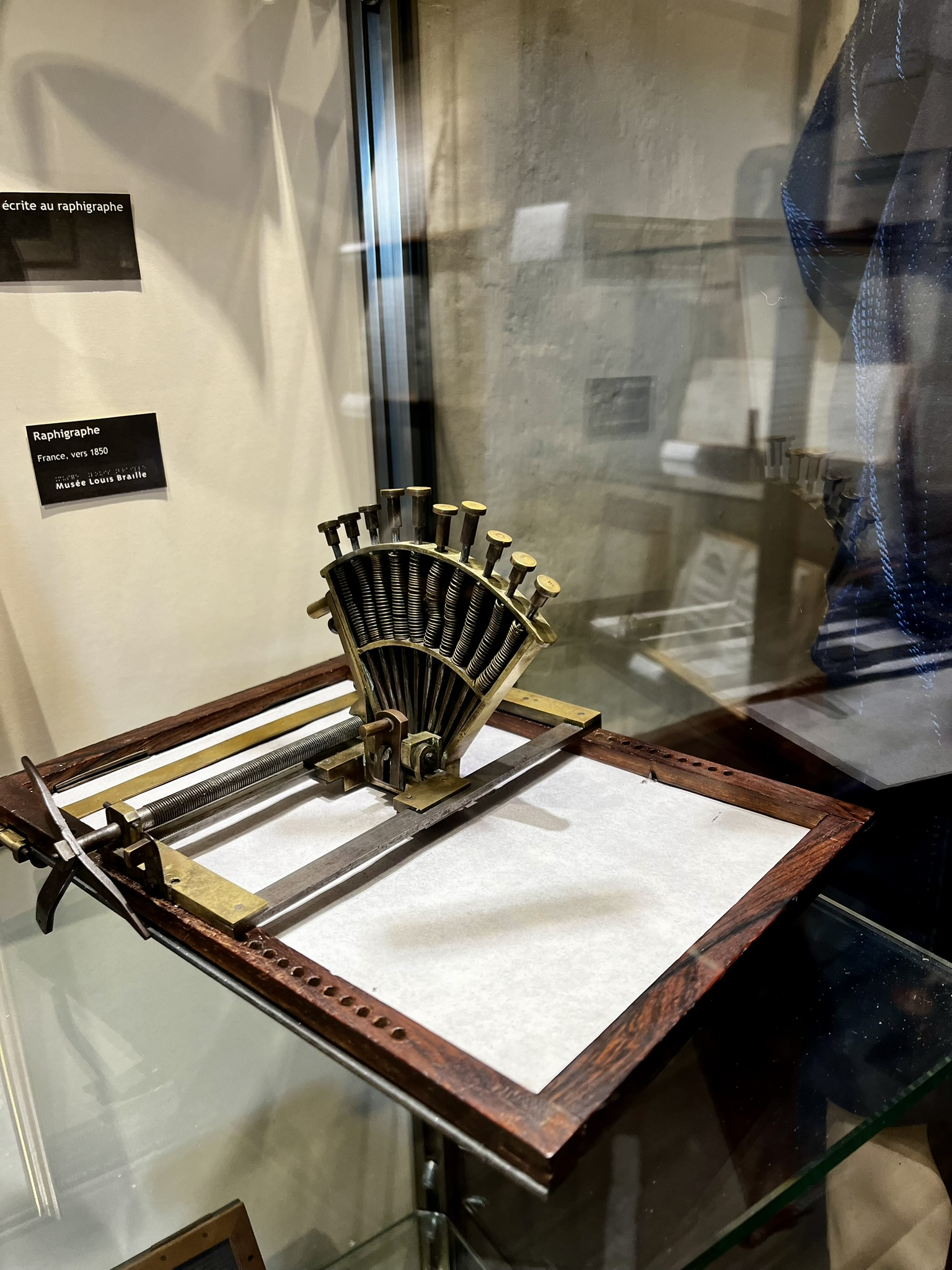
Raphigraphy

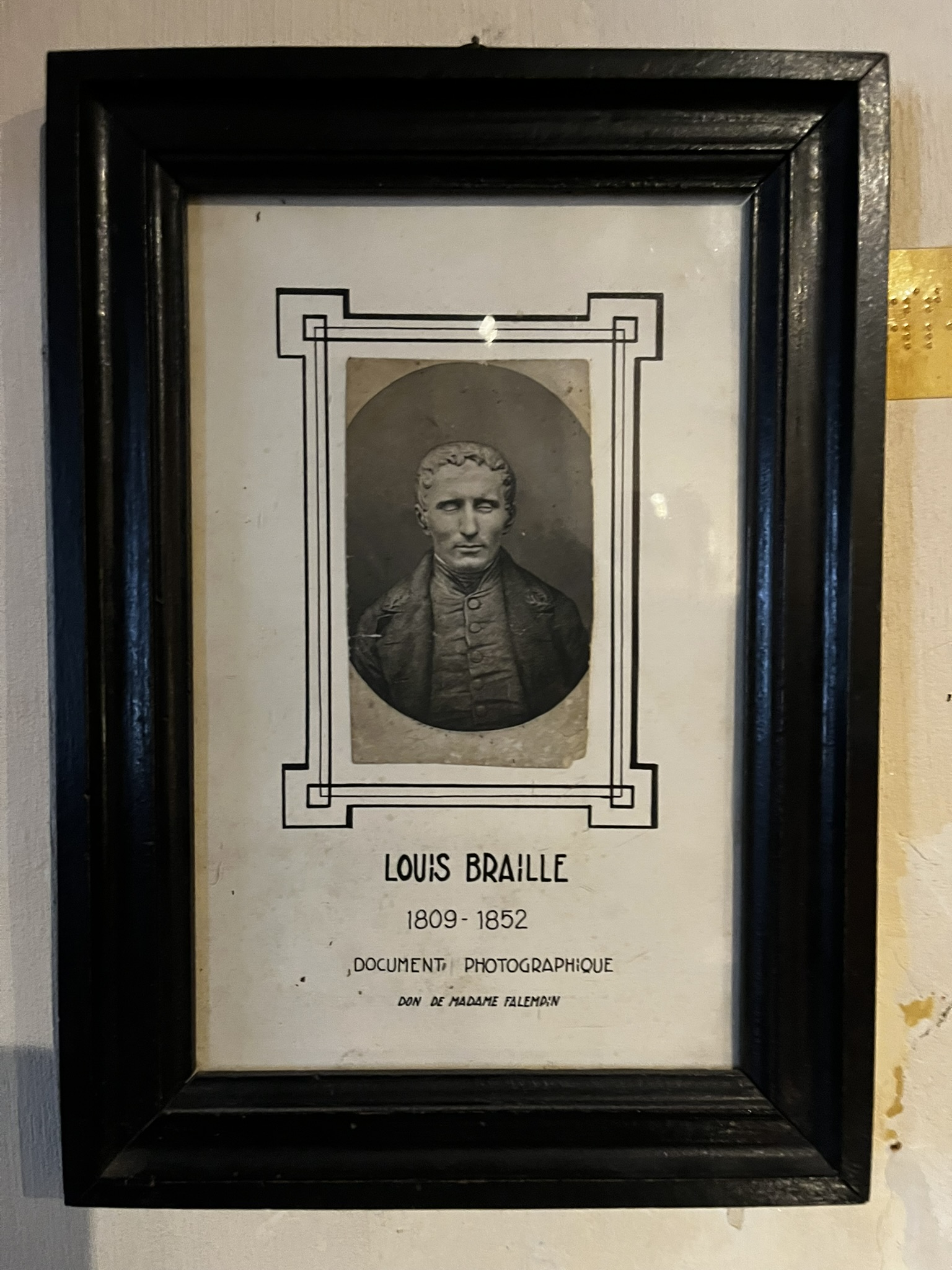
Photograph of Braille's death mask

Braille Slate and Stylus

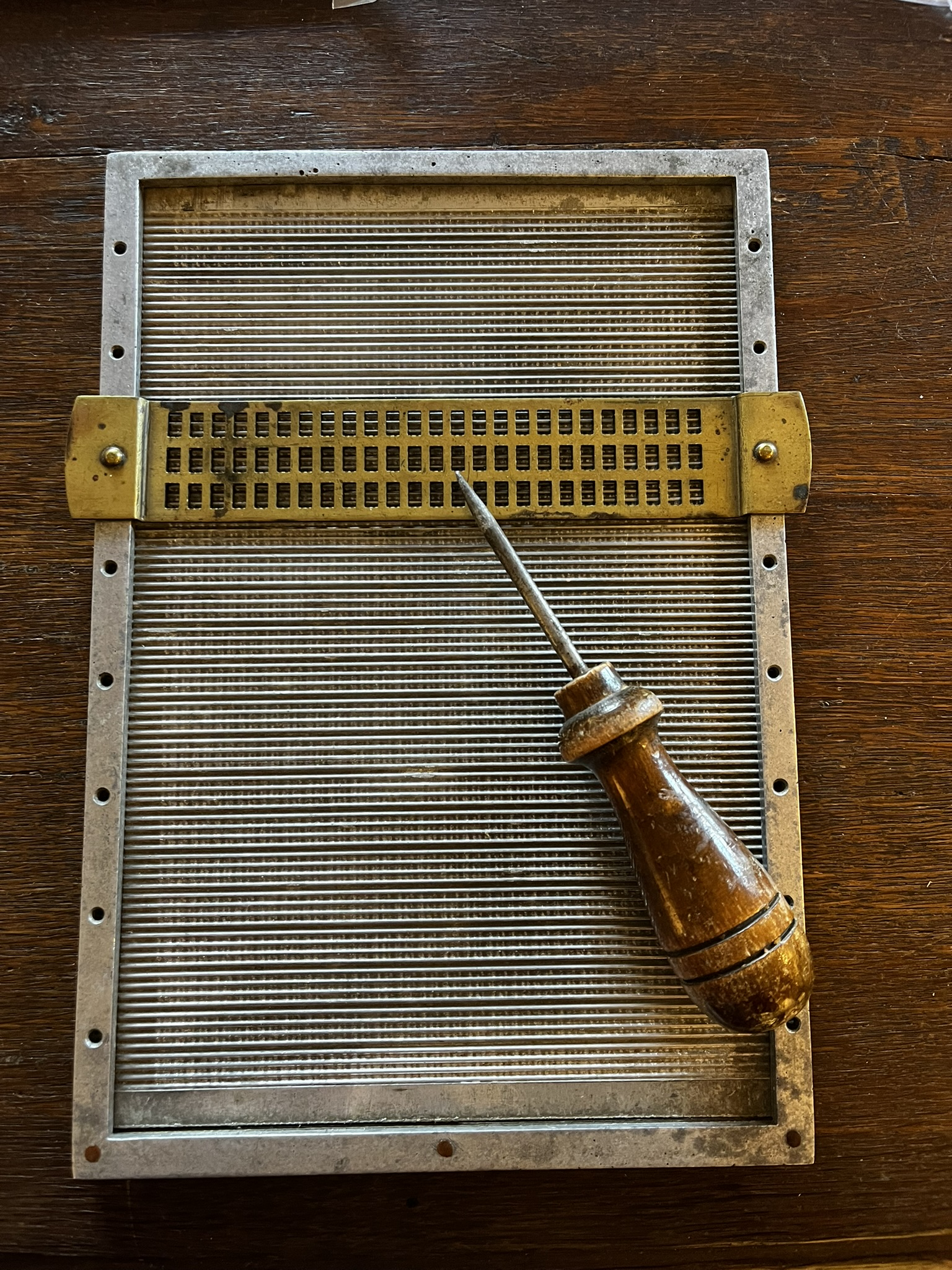
French slate c.1920s with handmade stylus

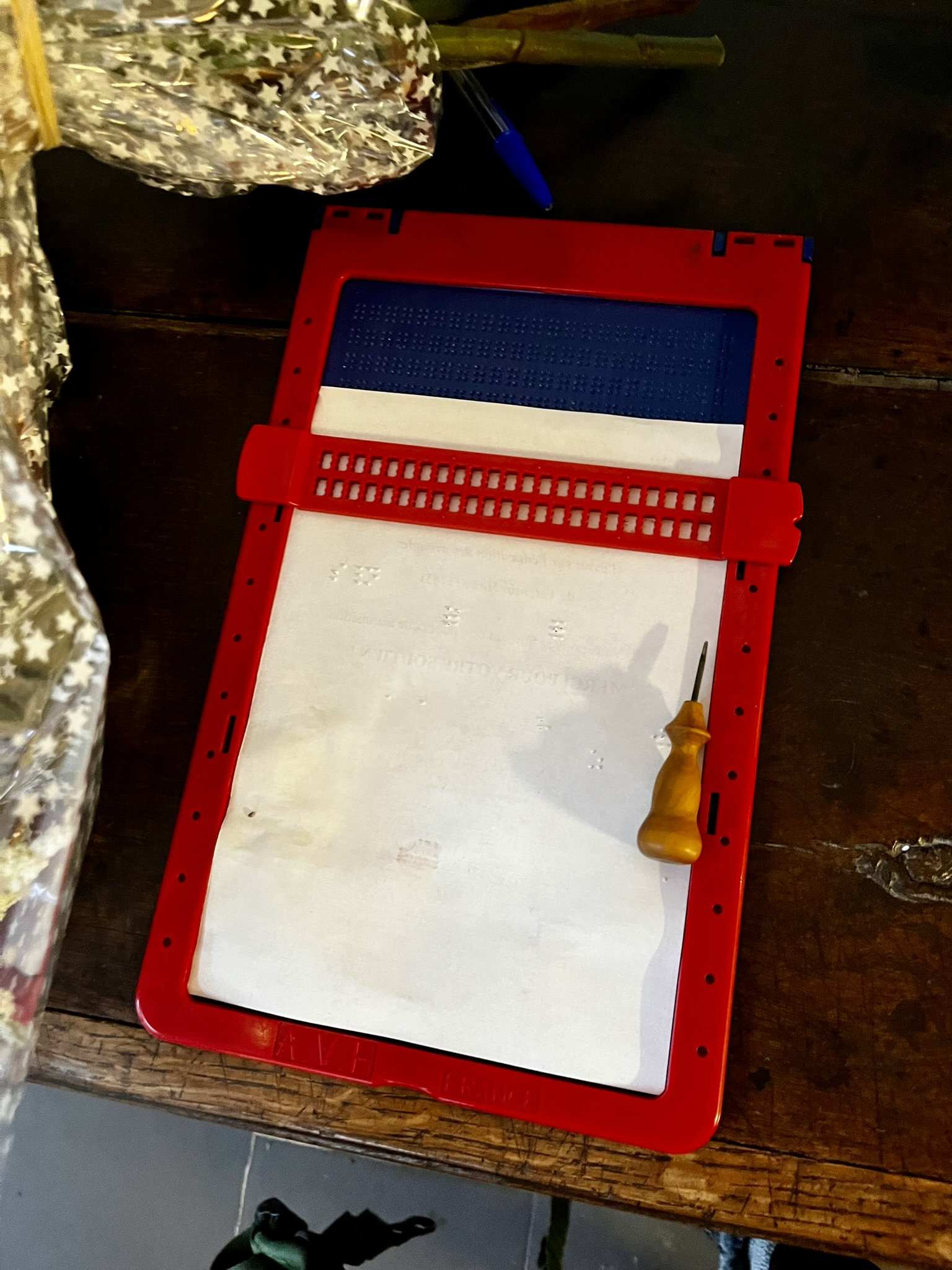
Modern plastic slate from Valentin Haüy Association

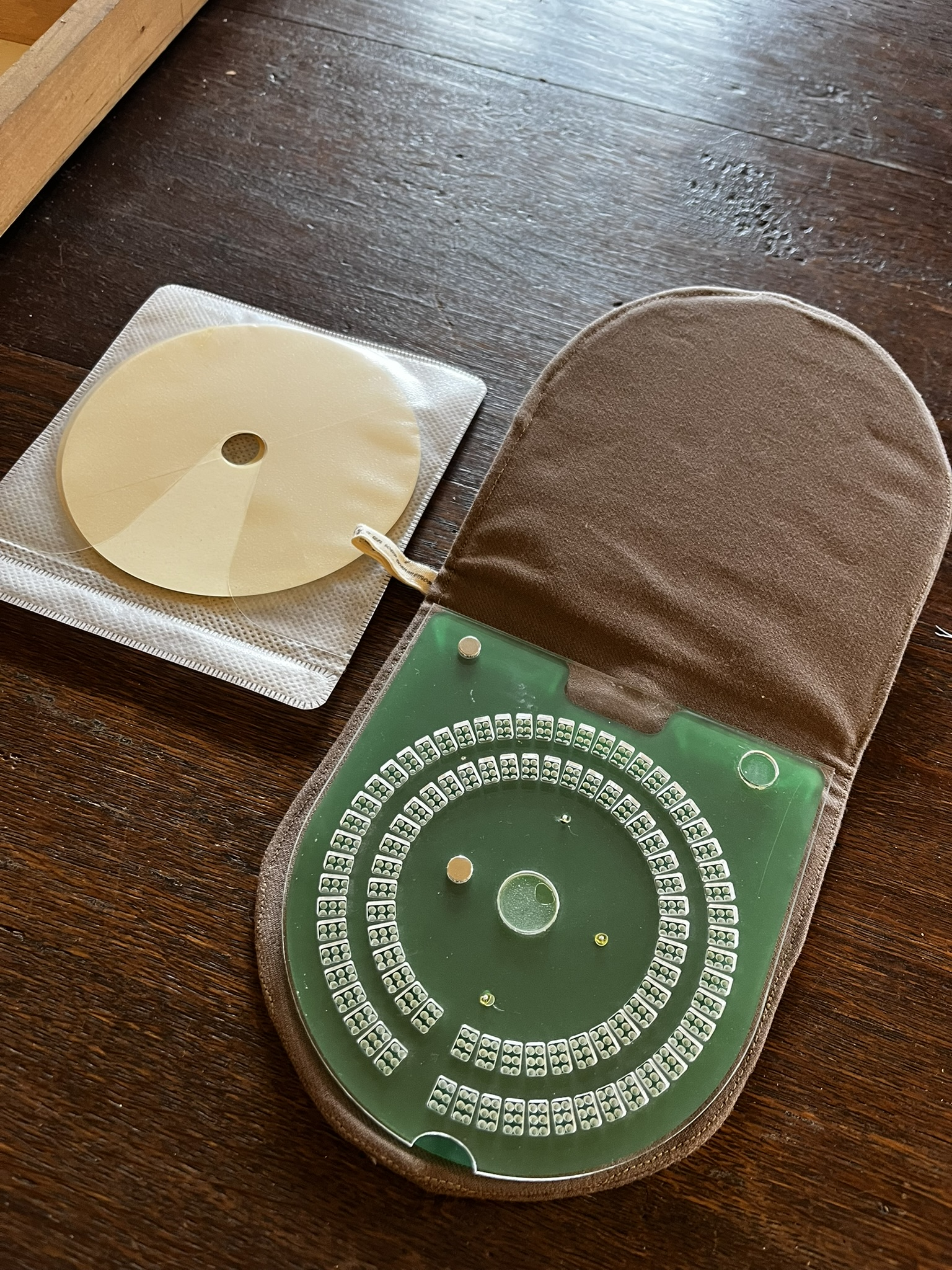
CD slate from Japan Braille Library

Braillewriters and Braille Display

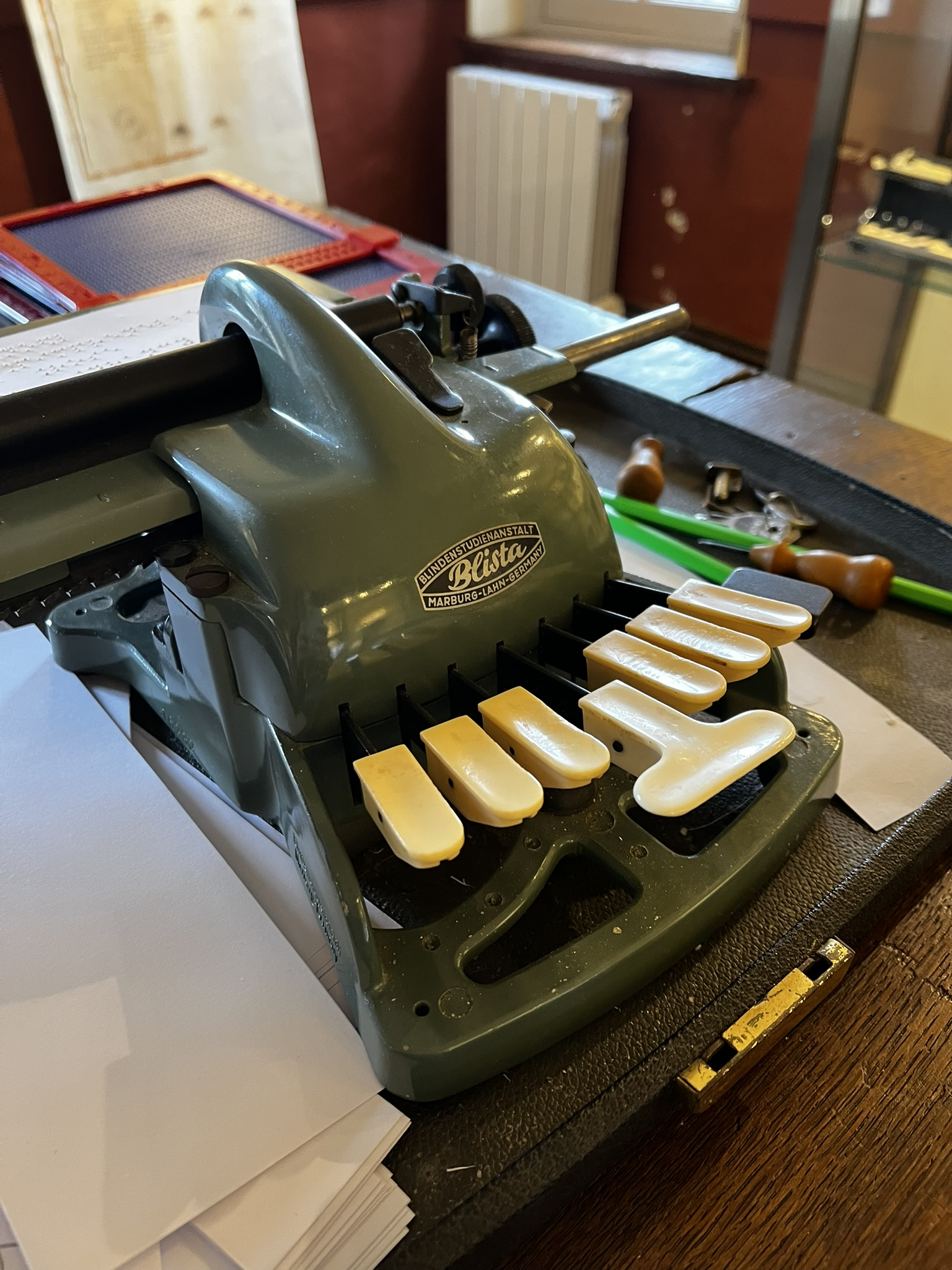
Blista from Germany

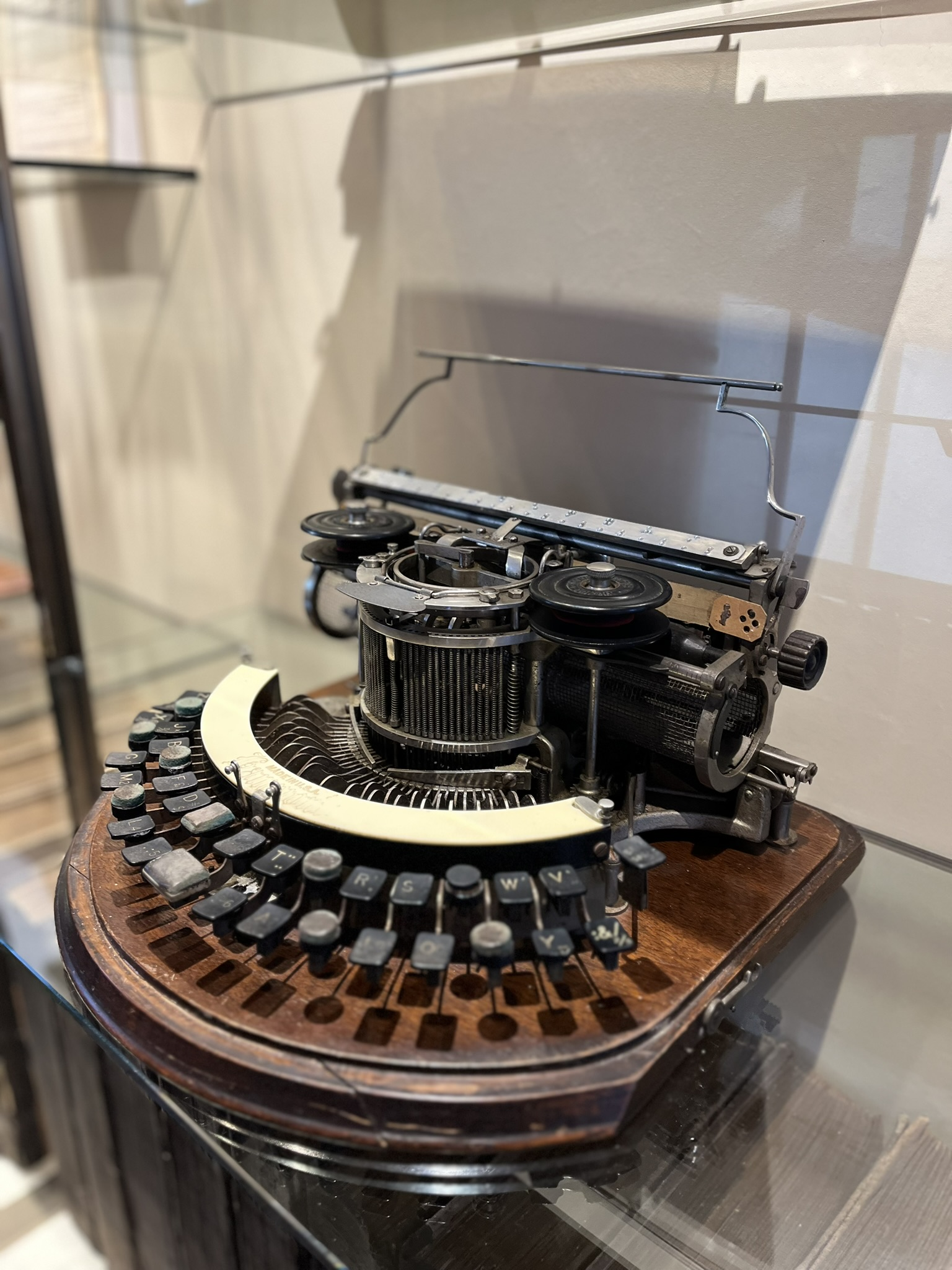
Hammond 12 typewriter, adapted for the blind

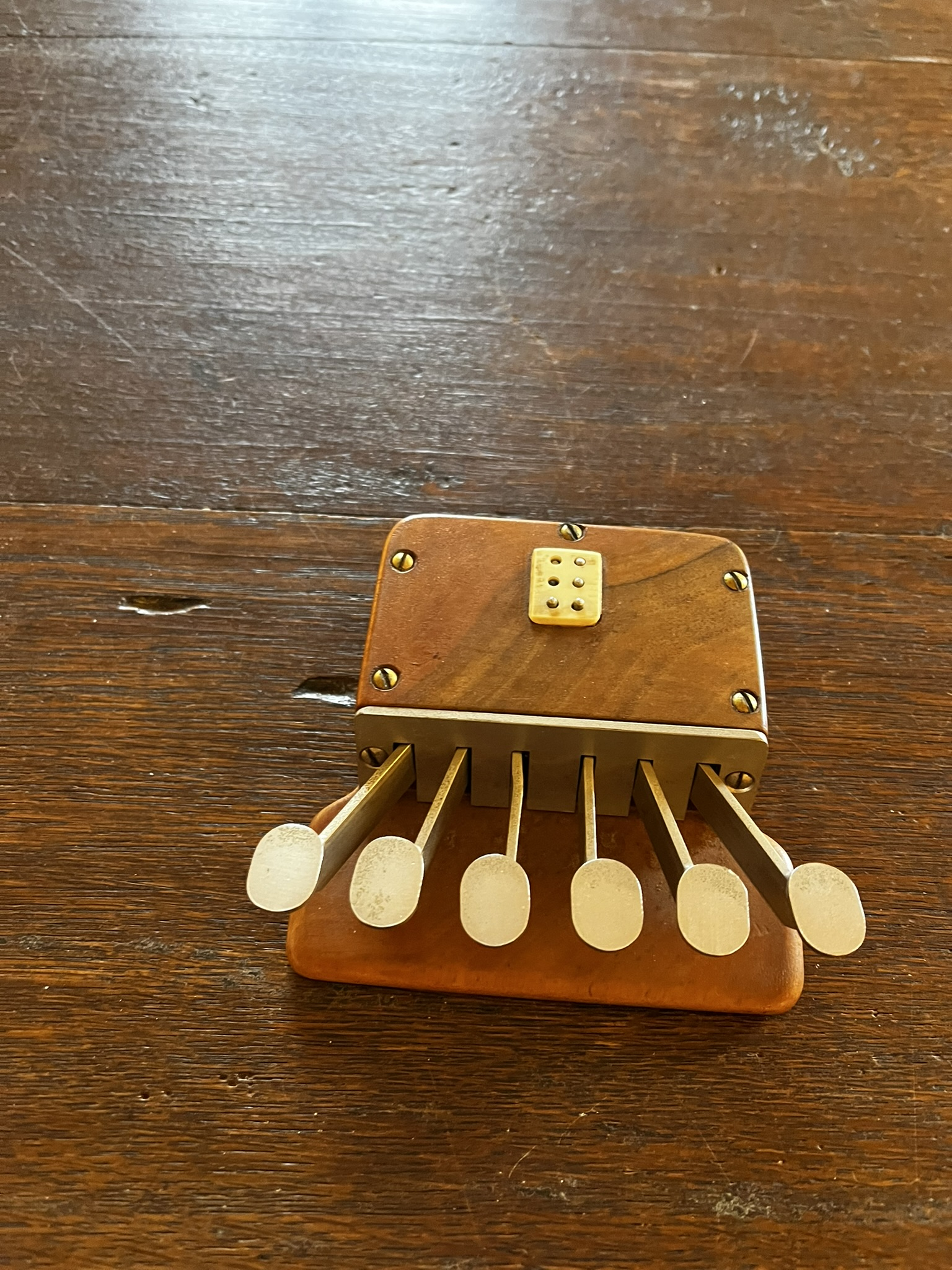
Parolonto from Switzerland c. 1950s
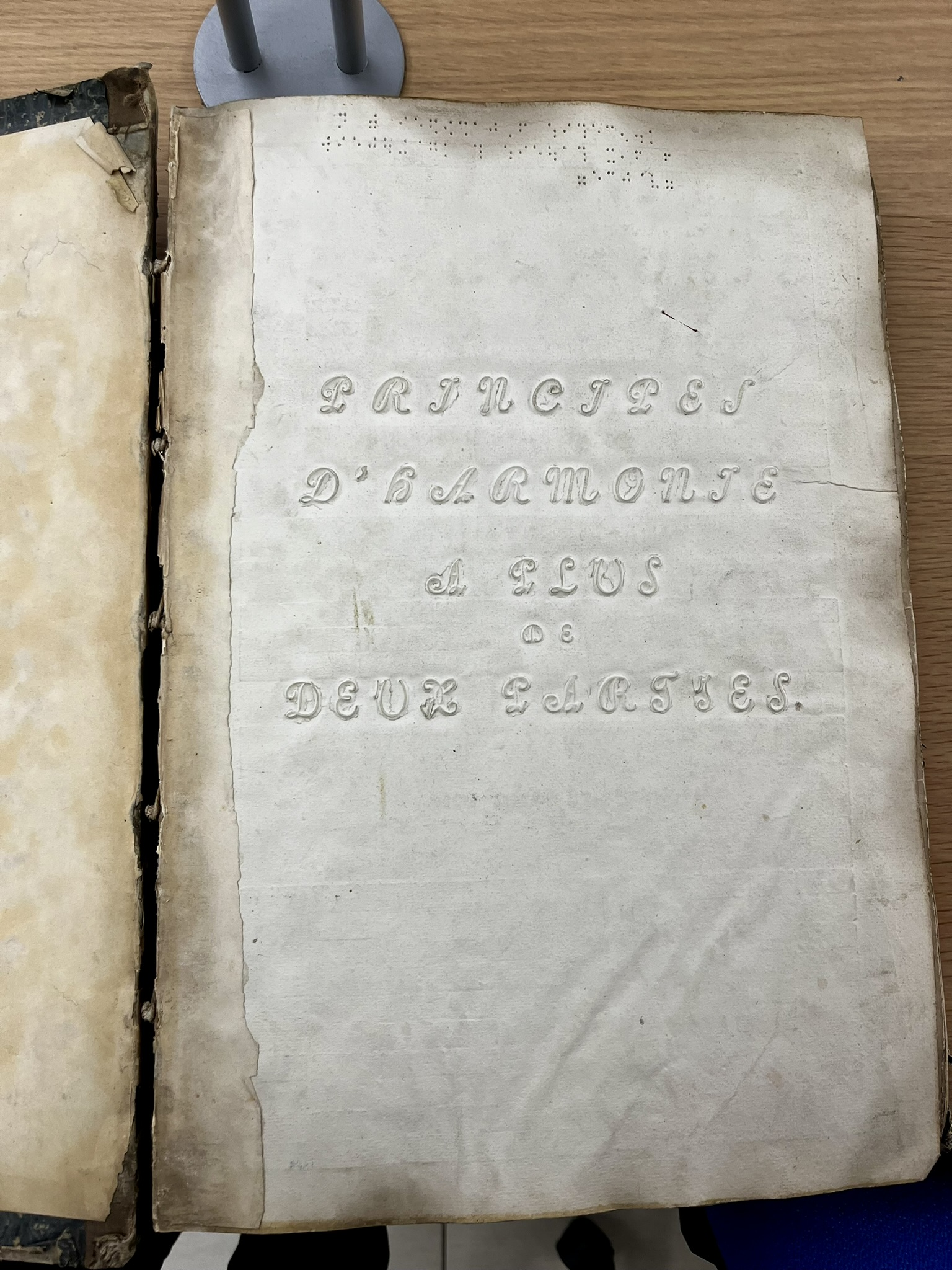
Haüy's printing method, INJA archives

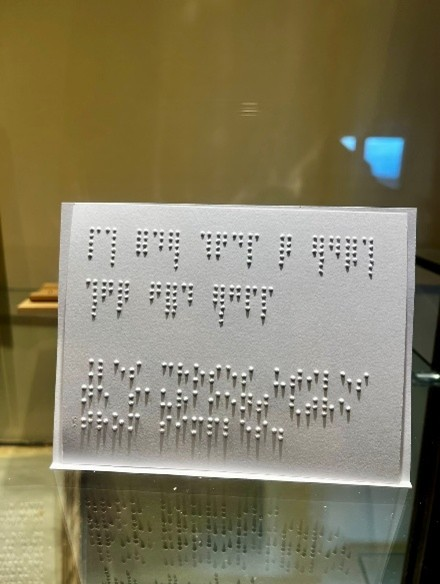
Comparing Barbier to Braille

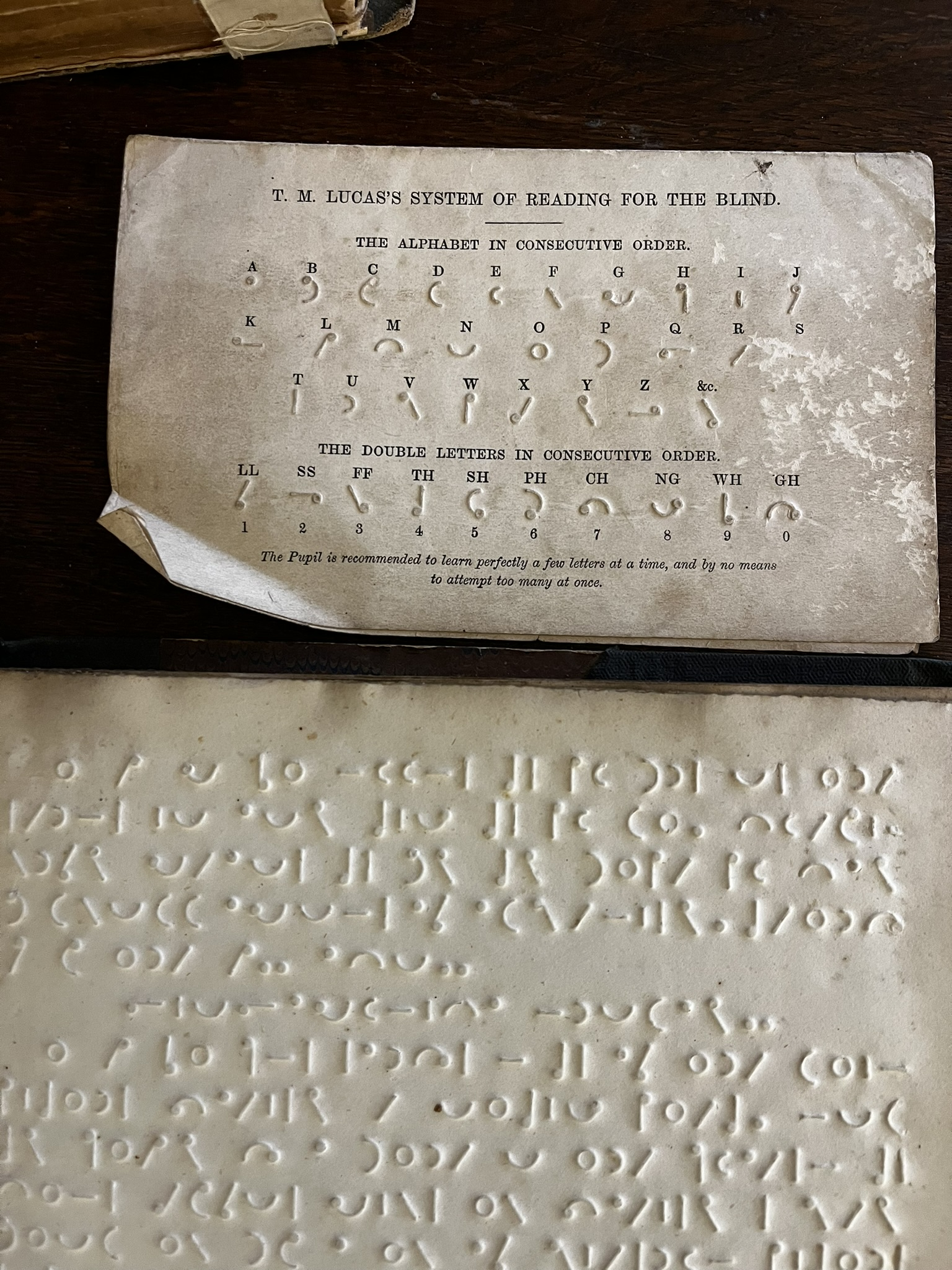
T.M. Lucas's system

== The experience ==
The museum offers several tours, the most popular being the tour of Louis Braille's home, where you learn about life in the early 1800s, Braille's inventions, and the history of tactile reading and writing systems. In addition, several hands-on workshops are available, including learning how to write braille using a slate and stylus.

Next to the museum is the Jardin des 5 sens (English: Garden of the Five Senses), which is divided into five sections, each focusing on a different sense. Throughout the garden there are informational signs in French print and braille.

Starting at the museum, there is a self-guided walking tour tracing important places relating to Louis Braille. The trail takes you to the Louis Braille monument created in 1887 by Frédéric-Étienne Leroux, Louis Braille's original grave (he now rests at the Panthéon in Paris), and the church where he was christened.

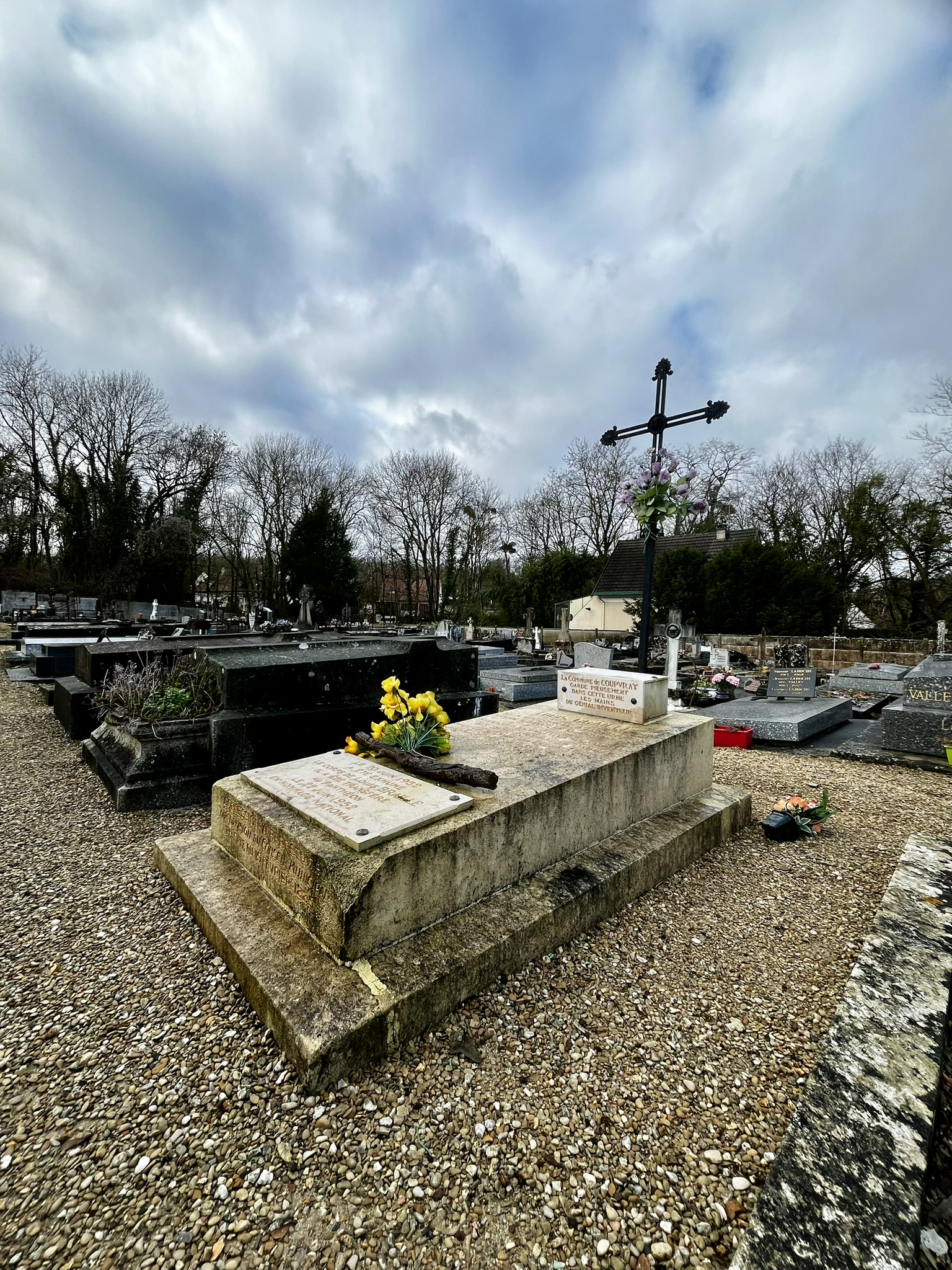
Louis Braille's grave

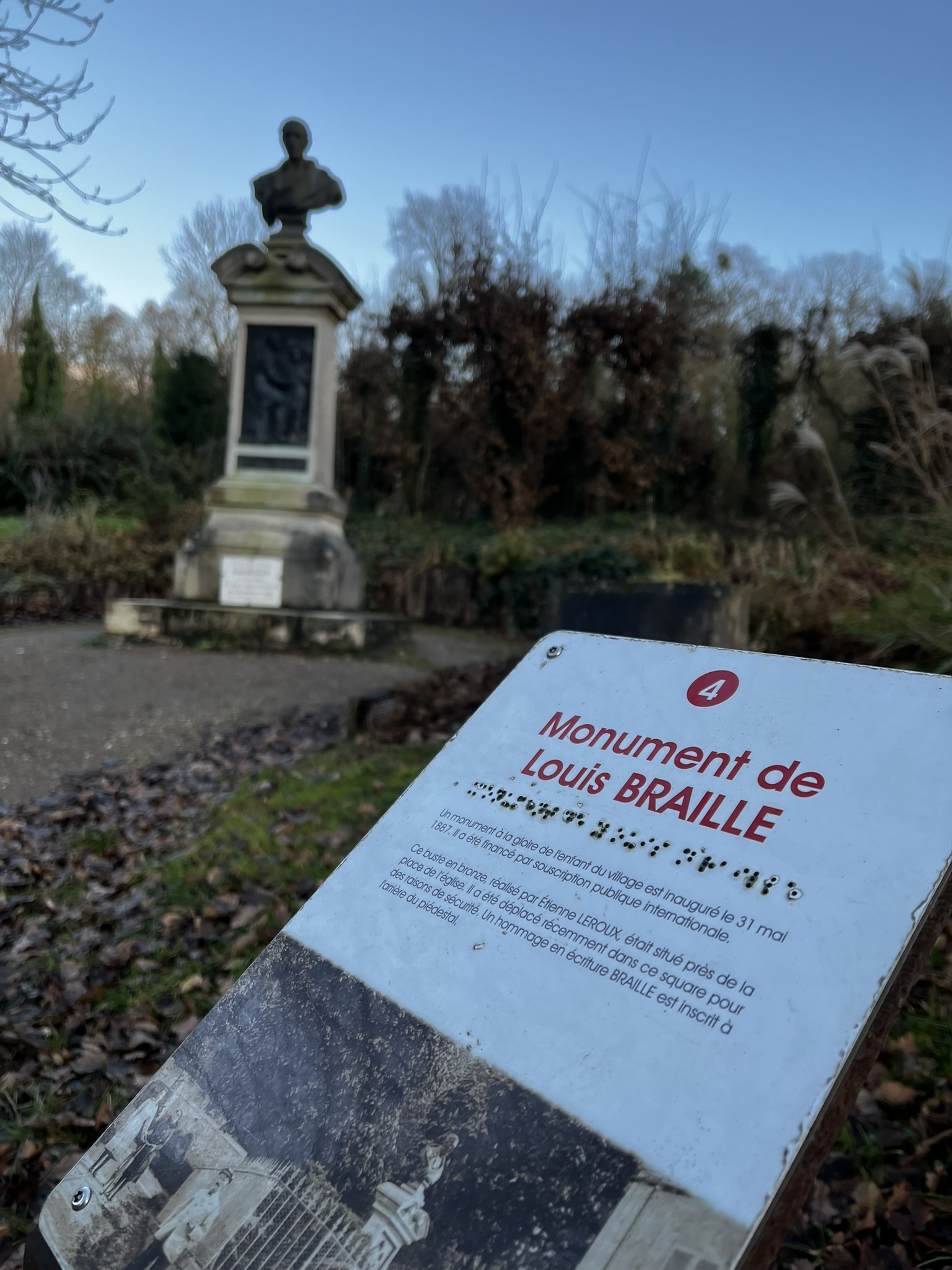
Louis Braille monument

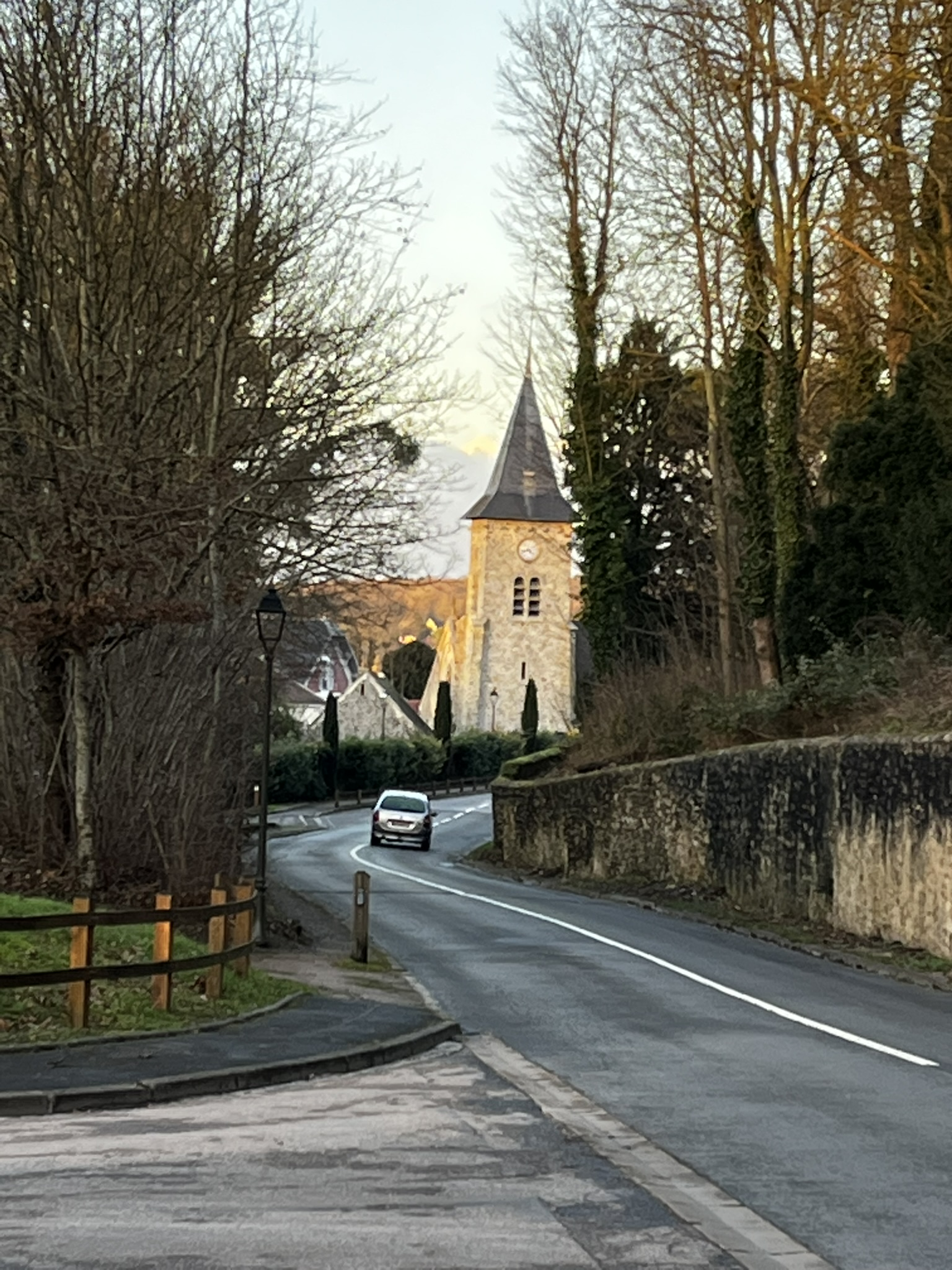
St. Pierre church where Louis Braille was baptized

== Accolades ==
- Awarded the Musée de France (Museum of France) accreditation in 1961.
- Listed as a Historic Monument by the French Ministry of Culture in 1966.
- Presented with the Maison des Illustres (Landmark House) in 2011.

== Bibliography ==
National Library Service for the Blind and Physically Handicapped; Friends of Libraries for Blind and Physically Handicapped Individuals in North America. "Braille Into the Next Millennium | Edited by Judith M. Dixon". Braille Into the Next Millennium. Retrieved 2025-07-16.

Weygand, Zina. "The Blind in French Society from the Middle Ages to the Century of Louis Braille | Zina Weygand Translated by Emily-Jane Cohen, with a Preface by Alain Corbin". Stanford University Press. The Blind in French Society from the Middle Ages to the Century of Louis Braille | Stanford University Press. Retrieved 2019-07-27.
