= World Braille Day =

Day raising awareness for the blind

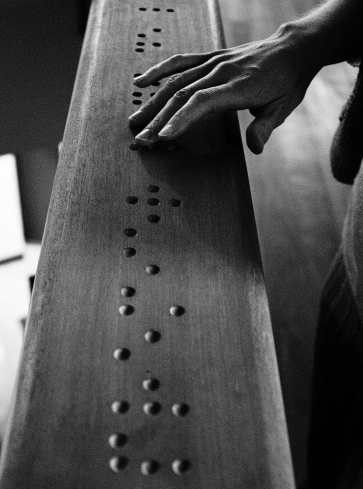
A hand reading wood-carved braille code, where the braille word “premier” can be read

World Braille Day is an international day on 4 January and celebrates awareness of the importance of braille as a means of communication in the full realization of the human rights for blind and visually impaired people. The date for the event was chosen by the United Nations General Assembly via a proclamation in November 2018, and marks the birthday of Louis Braille, creator of this writing system.

The first World Braille Day was celebrated on January 4, 2019.
