= Charles Barbier =

Inventor of raised-point writing

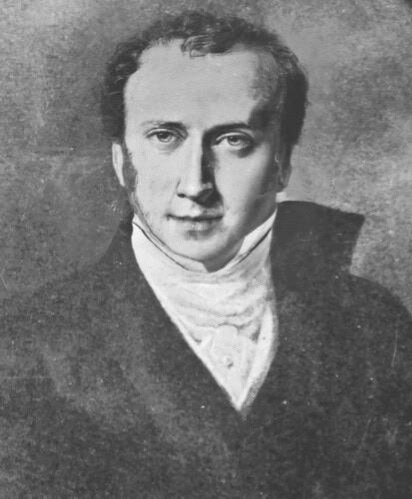
- Born: 18 May 1767; Valenciennes
- Died: 22 April 1841 (aged 73); Paris
- Occupation: Inventor

Charles Barbier de la Serre (French pronunciation: [ʃaʁl baʁbje də la sɛʁ]; 18 May 1767 – 22 April 1841) was the French inventor of several forms of shorthand and alternative means of writing, one of which became the inspiration for Braille.

Barbier was born in Valenciennes and served in the French artillery from 1784 to 1792. He left France during the Revolution and lived for several years in the United States, returning to France during the reign of Napoleon Bonaparte. He did not rejoin the military.

Barbier was interested in shorthand and other alternative writing forms. In 1815, he published a book titled, Essai sur divers procédés d'expéditive française. In this book, Barbier explains that conventional writing is a barrier to universal literacy because it takes too long to learn, and people who must earn their living (farmers, artisans) cannot devote the necessary time to education. Barbier was also concerned about the barriers to literacy faced by people with visual or hearing impairments.

== Raised-point writing ==
=== Principles ===
He proposed a simplified writing system based on a grid, which existed in two forms. The first is the conventional alphabet in a grid of 5x5 (at the time, the letter W was seldom used in the French language).

	1	2	3	4	5
1	a	b	c	d	e
2	f	g	h	i	j
3	k	l	m	n	o
4	p	q	r	s	t
5	u	v	x	y	z

Each letter could be represented by a two-digit number: the row number followed by the column number. For example, Q = 4,2.

The numbers 1 to 5 could, in turn, each be assigned a unique and simple symbol: two symbols together formed each letter.

There was also a phonetic version, containing the sounds of the French language. In the 1815 book, there were 30 sounds in a grid of five rows and six columns, but Barbier later expanded the number to 36, in a grid with six rows and six columns. Barbier preferred the phonetic version, arguing that learning the rules of spelling presented a further barrier to literacy for those without formal education.

The book included 12 plates that used different symbols to represent the numbers. One, plate VII, used dots to represent the numbers: Q would be a vertical row of 4 dots immediately followed by a vertical row of 2 dots.

•	•
•	•
•
•

The dots were not intended to be made with ink, but pressed into thick paper with a blunt punch so that they could be read with the fingers. Barbier simultaneously invented three tools to make this possible: a grooved board (or tablette) to receive the impressions, the punch itself, and a guide to ensure that the dots lined up. This construction served as the basis for the slate and stylus used to write Braille.

Although for many years it was assumed that Barbier had created this form of writing for the army to use at night, his 1815 book makes it clear that he intended the writing with raised dots for people who were blind. He believed it would be especially helpful for those who had been blind since birth.

In the same publication, he also suggested a method of representing letters using the fingers, which he suggested could be useful for deaf people. He referred to this as the "alphabet manuel," or manual alphabet.

=== Adoption ===
Barbier wrote to the Institution Royale des Jeunes Aveugles (Royal Institution for Blind Youth) in Paris to tell them about his invention. The first director was not interested, because the school had a tradition of using raised type that he had invested in significantly. When that director left in 1821, Barbier wrote again and the new director, a man called Alexandre-René Pignier, asked a student to learn the method and demonstrate it to the other students and to members of the board of directors.

The method was successful. The students, who had already learned the alphabet, used the grid with the conventional alphabet, even though Barbier continued to promote the phonetic version. Before this time, the students at the school had learned to read using books with raised letters that were difficult to decipher and that took up a great deal of space. If they learned to write at all, they could write in a way that only sighted people could read. Barbier's method allowed the students to take notes in class that they could re-read, and to communicate with other blind people.

The method had its drawbacks. It lacked symbols for punctuation or mathematical symbols and there was no distinction between capital letters and lowercase letters. It could not be used for musical notation. But it was a "proof of concept" – blind people could read raised dots that formed a code, and could easily use the tools that Barbier had invented. He donated many sets of the equipment to the school over the years. One of the students at the school, Louis Braille, eventually came up with a more compact and flexible system. However, without Barbier's original idea and his tools, Braille could not have achieved what he did. As one writer put it in a history of the school written in 1907: "The punch, the ruled tablette, and the guide, were a triple invention from which would come the practical instruction of the blind."

Years later, after both Barbier and Braille were dead, Alexandre-René Pignier wrote a short biography of Louis Braille. In it, he suggested that Braille, at a very young age, had pointed out the defects of Barbier's system. Later writers have embroidered on this story to describe a hostile encounter between Barbier and a very young Braille. In fact, the two did not meet until 1833, when Braille was an adult and four years after he had published his own system. Barbier and Braille became friendly. Letters between the two were cordial. Mellor includes one of the letters in his book about Louis Braille.

Barbier spent the rest of his life trying to promote his ideas for universal education. He wrote several more books and tried to get his simplified writing systems introduced into nursery schools, but without success. However, Braille's modification of Barbier's system and tools became the system used around the world today.

== See also ==
- Musée Louis Braille
- Slate and stylus
