= Slate and stylus =

Tool used by the blind to write text which can be read through touch

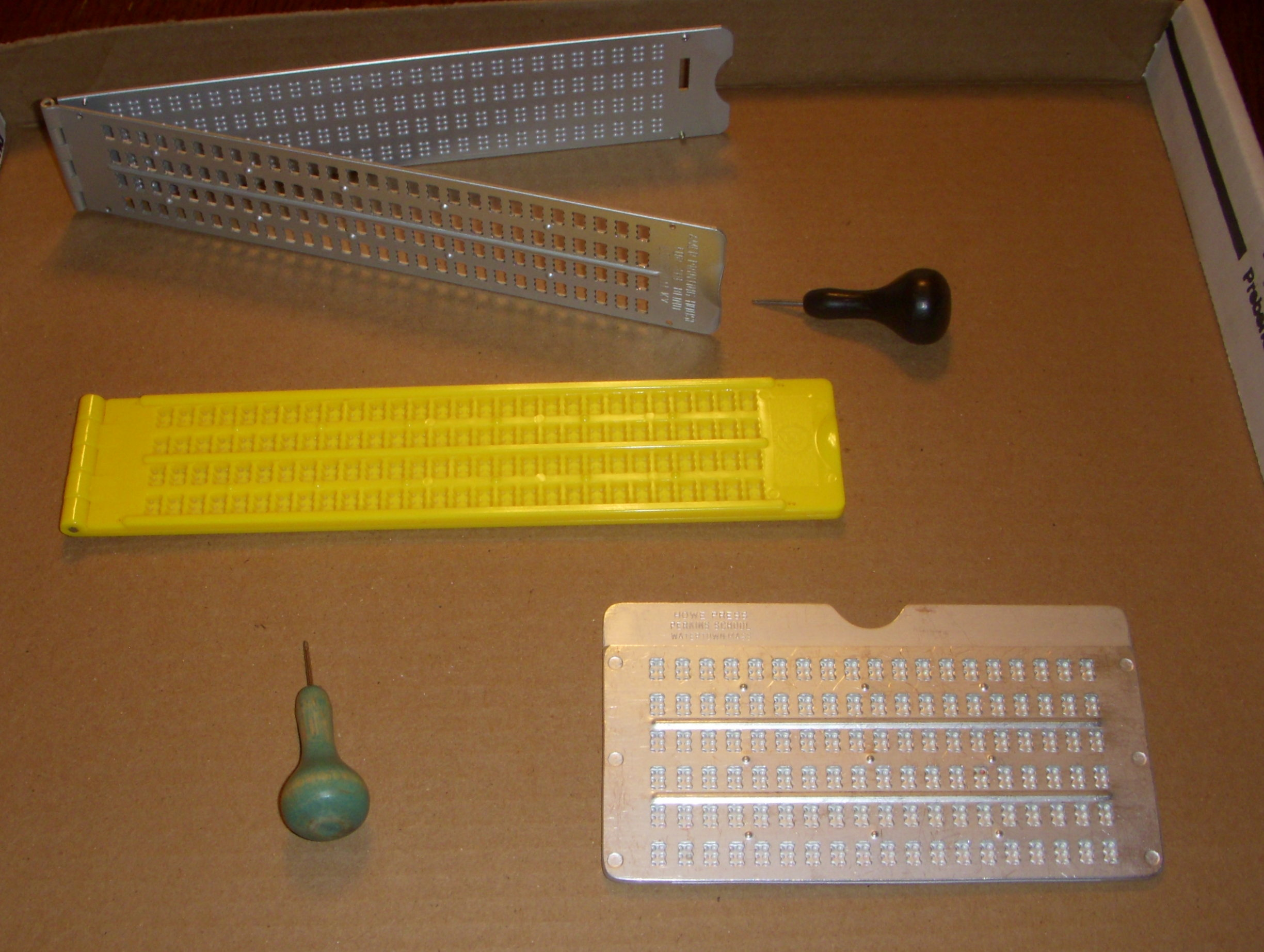
3 slates and 2 styli. Top slate is metal for 8.5 by 11 inch paper with four lines. Yellow slate is plastic. Bottom slate is for 3 by 5 inch card stock. Each stylus has a wood handle and a blunted metal point.

The slate and stylus are tools used by blind people to write text that they can read without assistance. Invented by Charles Barbier as the tool for writing letters that could be read by touch, the slate and stylus allow for a quick, easy, convenient and constant method of making embossed printing for Braille character encoding. Prior methods of making raised printing for the blind required a movable type printing press.

== Design ==
The basic design of the slate consists of two pieces of metal, plastic, or wood fastened together with a hinge at one side.

The back part of the slate is solid with slight depressions spaced in braille cells of six dots each. The depressions are approximately 0.75 mm (0.030 in) deep and about 1.5 mm (0.059 in) in diameter. The horizontal and vertical spacing between dots within a cell is approximately 2.5 mm (0.098 in), while the distance between adjacent cells is about 4 mm (0.16 in).

The front of the slate consists of rectangular windows that fit over the braille cells in the back. The inner rim of each window is provided with six indentations, which assist the user to position the stylus properly and press to form a dot.

There are pins or posts in the back of the slate positioned in non-cell areas to hold the paper in place and keep the top properly positioned over the back. The pins align with matching depressions on the opposite side of the slate. A slate as designed for a normal 8.5 inch piece of paper has 28 cells in each row. The rows can be any number, usually at least four.

The stylus is a short blunted awl with a handle to fit comfortably the hand of the user.

== Writing ==
Writing is accomplished by placing a piece of heavy paper in the slate, aligning it correctly and closing the slate. The pins in the back of the slate puncture or pinch the paper securely between the two halves of the slate.

The person writing begins in the upper right, as each combination of dots in the cell has to be completed backward. The awl is positioned and pressed to form a depression in the paper. The writer moves to one of the other dots in the cell or to the next cell as appropriate.

The slate is repositioned as needed to continue writing on the paper. When completed the writer removes the slate and turns the paper over to read the braille by feeling the dots that were pushed up from the back.

== History ==
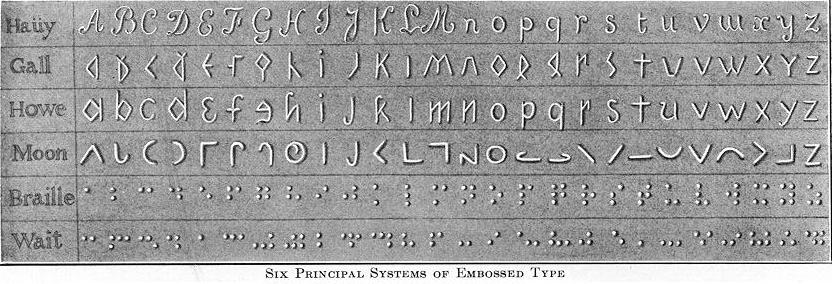
Six Principal Systems of Embossed Type;Haüy, Gall, Howe, Moon, Braille, Wait

In addition to the system devised by Louis Braille, a number of other methods for blind people to read and/or write on paper have been used. One of the most popular was the English system of Dr. William Moon invented in 1845. The English/Moon system or Moon type is easy to learn for the newly blind as it has a strong resemblance to the familiar written alphabet, but Braille has such great advantages over the Moon system for regular usage that the Moon system never became as popular. Braille with its slate and stylus was unique in that it was the first and, until computers with screen readers, the only method a blind person could write and read themselves what had been written.

The earliest systematic attempt to provide a method to "teach the blind to read and to write, and give them books printed by themselves" was by Valentin Haüy who used a system of embossed roman characters. In June 1784, Haüy sought his first pupil at the church of Saint-Germain-des-Prés. On 5 December 1786, Haüy's pupils had embossed from movable letterpress type his "Essai sur l'éducation des aveugles" (Essay on the Education of Blind Children), the first book ever published for the blind. Prior to 1786, tools for the blind to read or write were the results of individuals' personal solutions. One notable approach was that of Nicholas Saunderson (Lucasian Professor of Mathematics at Cambridge) blind nearly from birth, who devised an Arithmetical slate.

Braille evolved from a method developed by Charles Barbier. It was successfully used at the Institution Royale des Jeunes Aveugles in Paris for several years, until Braille created his own system, which was more compact and flexible.
