= Blindness and education =

Education of students with vision impairment

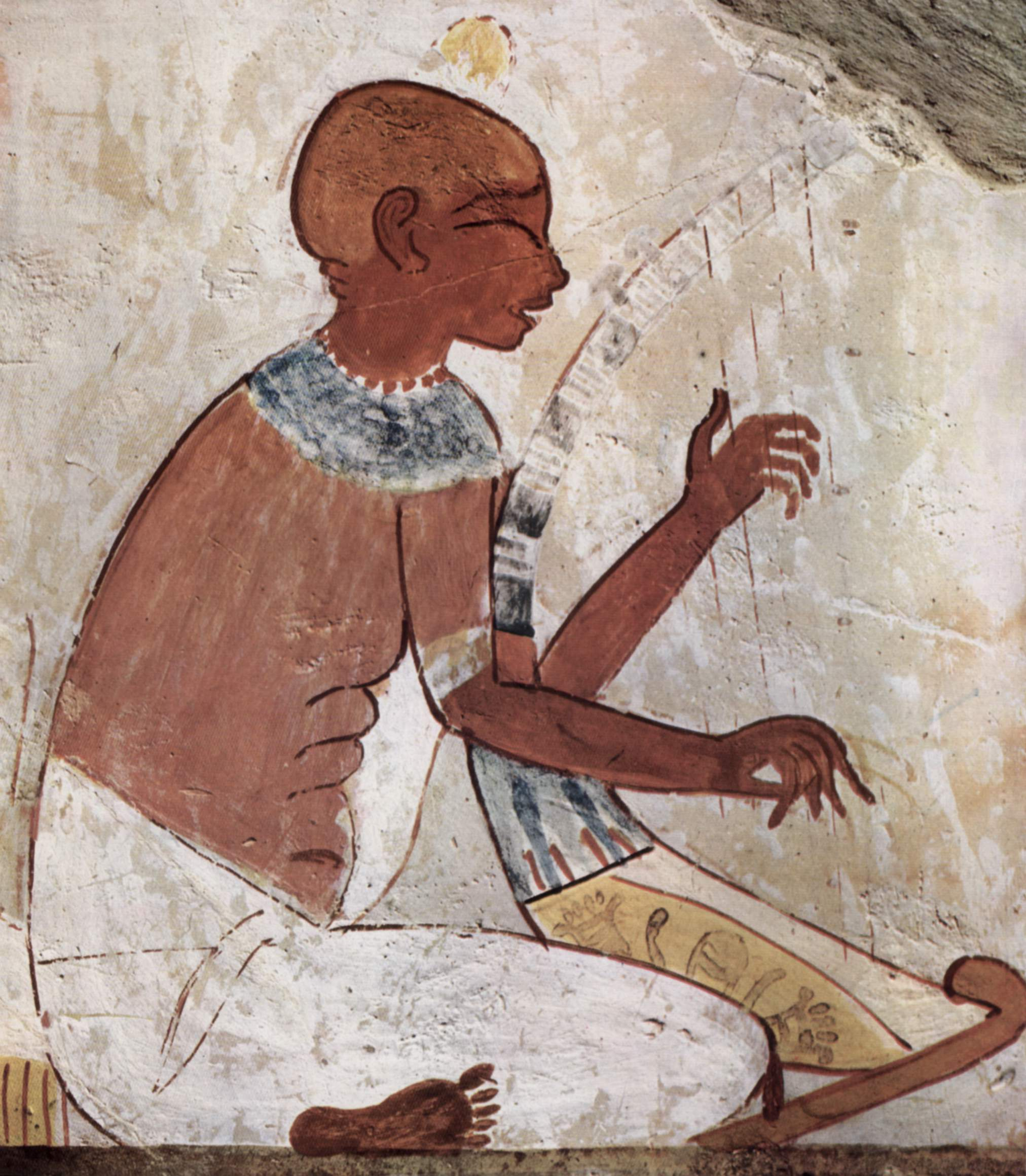
During the Middle Kingdom of Ancient Egypt (c. 2040–1640 BCE) blind harpists are depicted on tomb walls. They represented a significant proportion of the poets and musicians in society.

The subject of blindness and education has included evolving approaches and public perceptions of how best to address the special needs of blind students. The practice of institutionalizing the blind in asylums has a history extending back over a thousand years, but it was not until the 18th century that authorities created schools for them where blind children, particularly those more privileged, were usually educated in such specialized settings. These institutions provided simple vocational and adaptive training, as well as grounding in academic subjects offered through alternative formats. Literature, for example, was being made available to blind students by way of embossed Roman letters.

== Ancient Egypt ==
The Ancient Egyptians were the first civilisation to display an interest in the causes and cures for disabilities and during some periods blind people are recorded as representing a substantial portion of the poets and musicians in society. In the Middle Kingdom (c. 2040–1640 BCE), blind harpists are depicted on tomb walls. They were not exclusively interested in the causes and cures for blindness but also the social care of the individual.

== Early institutions for the blind ==
An early institution for the blind was the Hospital Royal des Quinze Vingts established by the French monarch for soldiers who had lost their sight. Applicants had to be both blind and poor and they received 24 sous a day for their food and clothing. Some of the residents produced craft work but they received no formal instruction.

Asylums for the Industrious Blind were established in Edinburgh and Bristol in 1765, but the first school anywhere, to expressly teach the blind was set up by Edward Rushton in Liverpool as the School for the Instruction of the Indigent Blind in 1791. It taught the blind children skills in manual crafts although there was no formal education as such. Other institutions set up at that time were: the School for the Indigent Blind in London and the Asylum and School for the Indigent Blind at Norwich.

In France, the Institut National des Jeunes Aveugles was established in 1784 by Valentin Haüy. Haüy's impulse to help the blind began when he witnessed the blind being mocked during a religious street festival. In May 1784, at Saint-Germain-des-Prés, he met a young beggar, François Lesueur; he was his first student. He developed a method of raised letters, to teach Lesueur to read, and compose sentences. He made rapid progress, and Haüy announced the success, in September 1784 in the Journal de Paris, then receiving encouragement from the French Academy of Sciences.

With the help of the Philanthropic Society Haüy founded the Institute for Blind Youth, the Institut National des Jeunes Aveugles, in February 1785. Building on the philanthropic spinning workshop for the blind, the institution of Blind Children was dedicated on 26 December 1786. Its purpose was to educate students and teach them manual work: spinning, and letterpress.

== Braille system ==
Louis Braille attended Haüy's school in 1819 and later taught there. He soon became determined to fashion a system of reading and writing that could bridge the critical gap in communication between the sighted and the blind. In his own words: "Access to communication in the widest sense is access to knowledge, and that is vitally important for us if we [the blind] are not to go on being despised or patronized by condescending sighted people. We do not need pity, nor do we need to be reminded we are vulnerable. We must be treated as equals – and communication is the way this can be brought about."

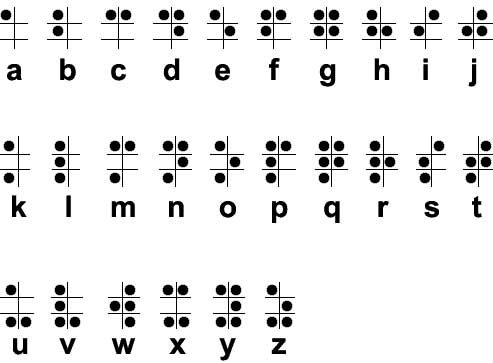
Alphabet chart for English braille. The letter "W" is not part of the French alphabet, and was only appended to the additional letters with diacritics.

In 1821, Braille learned of a communication system devised by Captain Charles Barbier of the French Army. Barbier's "night writing" was a code of dots and dashes impressed into thick paper. These impressions could be interpreted entirely by the fingers, letting soldiers share information on the battlefield without having light or needing to speak.

The captain's code turned out to be too complex to use in its original military form, but it inspired Braille to develop a system of his own. Braille worked tirelessly on his ideas, and his system was largely completed by 1824, when he was just fifteen years of age. From Barbier's night writing, he innovated by simplifying its form and maximizing its efficiency. He made uniform columns for each letter, and he reduced the twelve raised dots to six. He published his system in 1829, and by the second edition in 1837 had discarded the dashes because they were too difficult to read. Crucially, Braille's smaller cells were capable of being recognized as letters with a single touch of a finger.

== Education for the blind ==
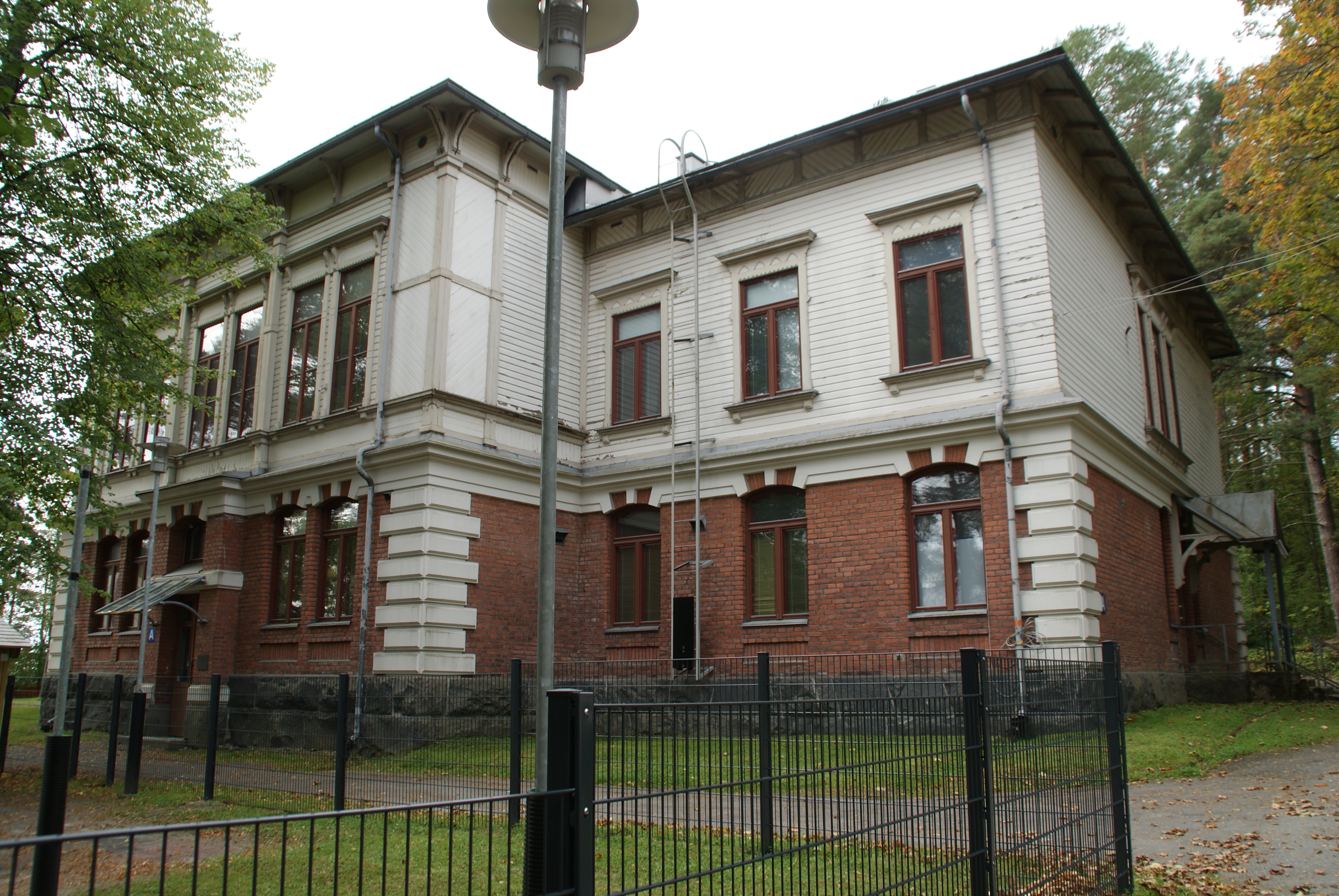
A main building of the School of the Blind from the late 19th century in Kuopio, Finland

The first school with a focus on proper education was the Yorkshire School for the Blind in England. Established in 1835, it taught arithmetic, reading and writing, while at the school of the London Society for Teaching the Blind to Read founded in 1838 a general education was seen as the ideal that would contribute the most to the prosperity of the blind. Educator Thomas Lucas introduced the Lucas Type, an early form of embossed text different from the Braille system.

Another important institution at the time was the General Institution for the Blind at Birmingham (1847), which included training for industrial jobs alongside a more general curriculum. The first school for blind adults was founded in 1866 at Worcester and was called the College for the Blind Sons of Gentlemen.

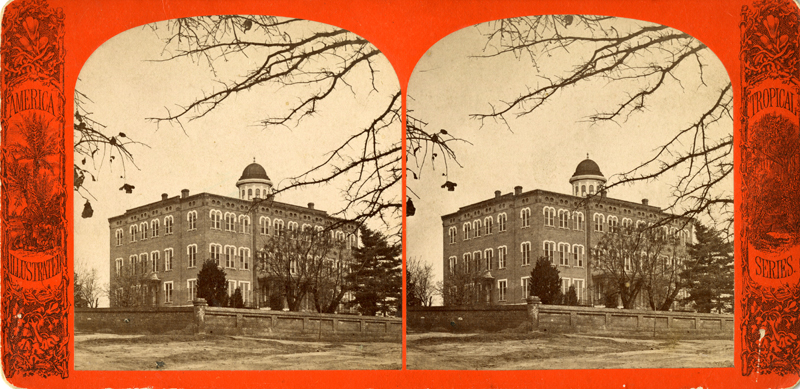
Georgia Academy for the Blind, Macon, Georgia, US, c. 1876

In 1889 the Edgerton Commission published a report that recommended that the blind should receive compulsory education from the age of 5–16 years. The law was finally passed in 1893, as an element of the broader Elementary Education Act. This act ensured that blind people up to the age of 16 years were entitled to an Elementary-Level Education as well as to Vocational Training.

The 1880s also saw the introduction of compulsory elementary education for the Blind throughout the United States. (However, most states of the United States did not pass laws specifically making elementary education compulsory for the blind until after 1900.)

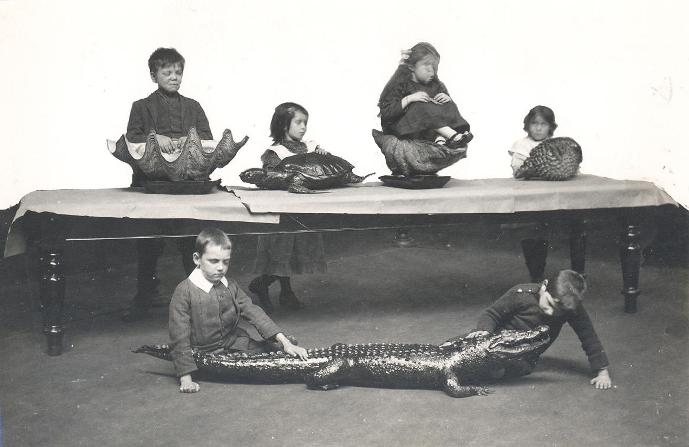
Children from the Sunderland Council Blind School using touch to identify different creatures at Sunderland Museum, 1910s

By this time, reading codes - chiefly braille and New York Point - had gained favor among educators as embossed letters (such as Moon type) were said by some to be difficult to learn and cumbersome to use, and so (DOT CODES) were either newly created or imported from well-established schools in Europe. Though New York Point was widely accepted for a time, Braille has since emerged the victor in what some blindness historians have dubbed "the War of the Dots".

The more respected residential schools were staffed by competent teachers who kept abreast of the latest developments in educational theory. While some of their methods seem archaic by today's standards - particularly where their Vocational Training options are concerned - their efforts did pave the way for the education and integration of blind students in the 20th century.

The early 20th century saw a handful of blind students enrolled in their neighborhood schools, with special educational supports. Most still attended residential institutions, but that number dropped steadily as the years wore on - especially after the white cane was adopted into common use as a mobility tool and symbol of blindness in the 1930s.

== Aniruddha's Bank for The Blind ==
An estimated 253 million people live with vision impairment: 36 million are blind and 217 million have moderate to severe vision impairment in the world with nearly 80 lakhs in India itself out of which number of blind students is close to 30 lakhs. As per the law of nature, when one sensory organ does not function in human body, the other sensory organs become more active to compensate for the defect. In the case of blind persons, hearing and touch are very active and play an important role. Aniruddha's Bank for The Blind, conceptualized and operationalized by Shree Aniruddha Upasana Foundation, Mumbai, India, supports education for the blind in an affectionate and unique way. The bank records the study curriculum in 12 languages like English, Hindi, Marathi, Gujarati, Tamil, Kannada, Bengali, Malayalam, Telugu, and Sanskrit by the people who are well versed in their own mother tongue. To date, the recorded CDs have made a difference in the lives of blind people in almost 26 states of India and a few regions of neighbouring Pakistan too. The bank maintains high quality and standard of the CDs by regular and diligent verification.

== Today ==
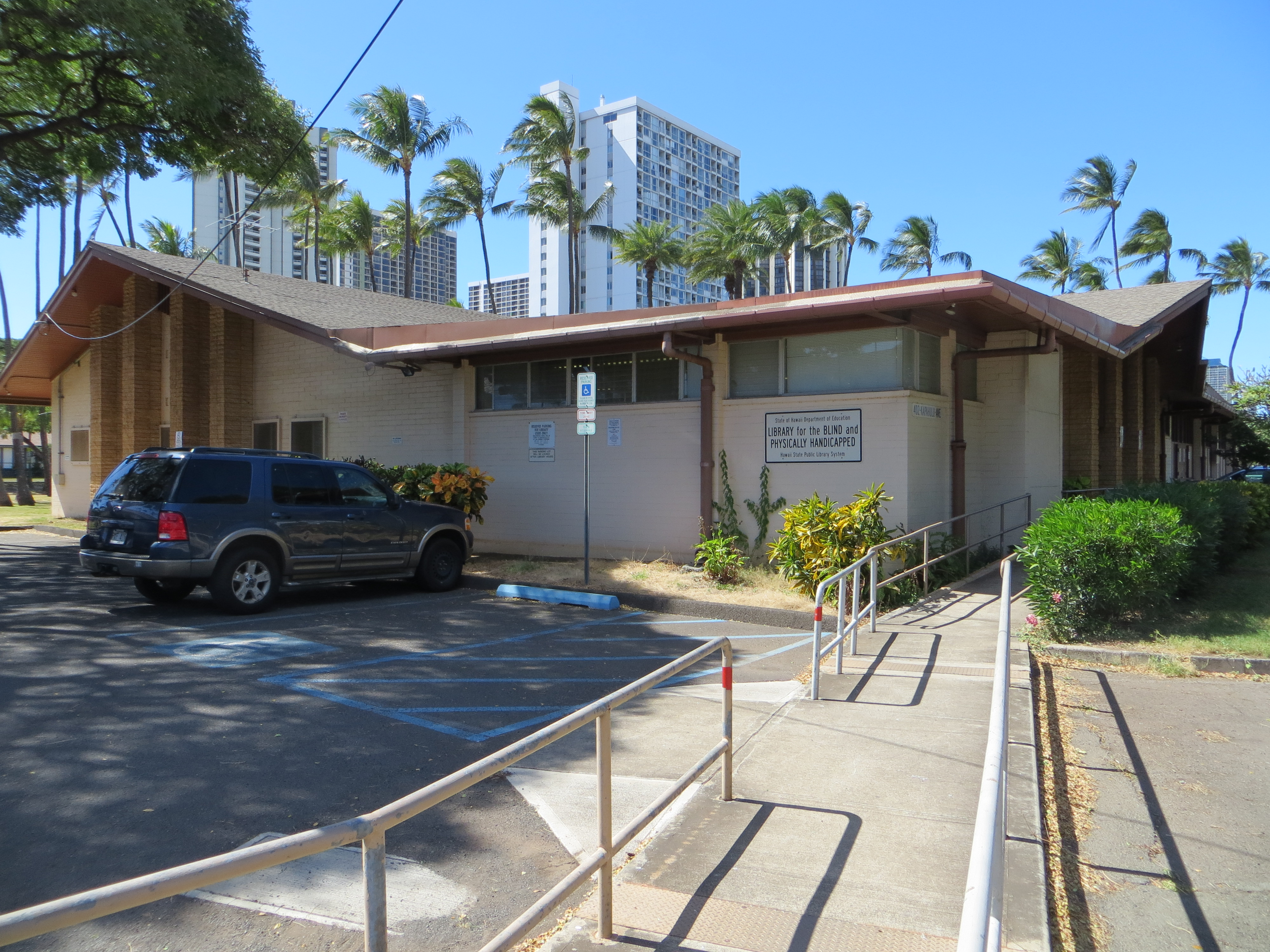
Waikiki-Kapahulu Library for the Blind and Physically Handicapped in Honolulu, Hawaii

Most blind and visually impaired students now attend their neighborhood schools, often aided in their educational pursuits by regular teachers of academics and by a team of professionals who train them in alternative skills: Orientation and Mobility (O and M) training - instruction in independent travel - is usually taught by contractors educated in that area, as is Braille. Blind children may also need special training in understanding spatial concepts, and in self-care, as they are often unable to learn visually and through imitation as other children do.

Since only ten percent of those registered as legally blind have no usable vision, many students are also taught to use their remaining sight to maximum effect, so that some read print (with or without optical aids) and travel without canes.

A combination of necessary training tailored to the unique needs of each student and solid academics goes a long way towards producing blind and visually impaired students capable of dealing with the world independently.

== See also ==
- Category:Blindness organizations
- Category:Schools for the blind
- Braille music
- Nico (also known as Nicholas), a TV series for educating children about blind people
- Thérèse-Adèle Husson
- T. V. Raman
- Zina Weygand
- Deaf education
