= Pierre-François-Victor Foucault =

French inventor and musician

Pierre-François-Victor Foucault (1797–1871) was the inventor in 1843 of the first printing machine for braille, the decapoint.

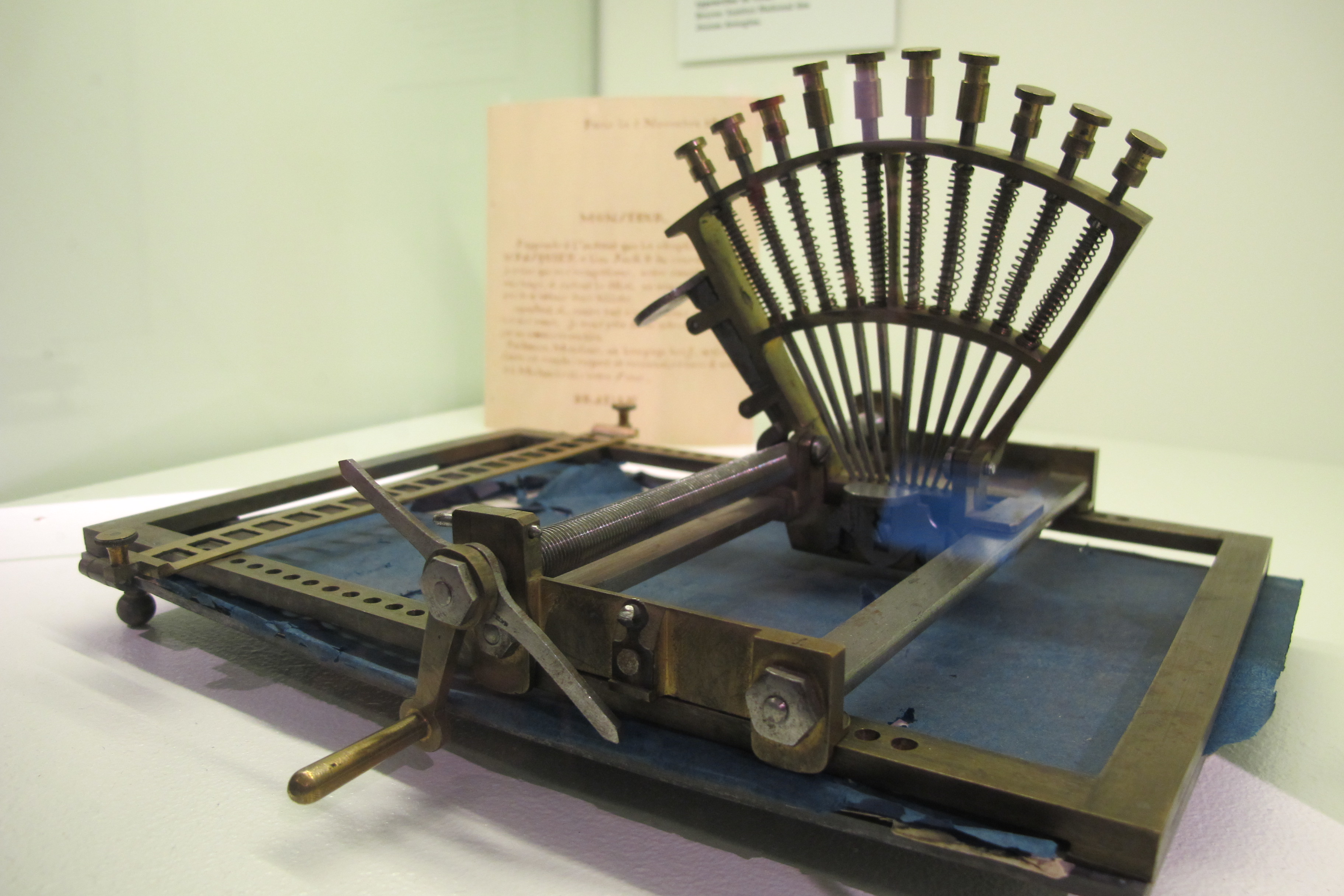
An example of raphigraphe

== Life ==
A pupil of the Institut National des Jeunes Aveugles, Foucault married Thérèse-Adèle Husson, a blind author, in 1826. This marriage gave birth to two daughters. After his wife's death in 1831, following a fire, he married a seamstress (non blind) in 1832, Adélaïde Louise Juteau. This allowed him to become a resident of the Quinze-Vingts (marriages between blind people were prohibited), which gave him the financial possibility to collaborate with Louis Braille.

== The raphigraphe ==
His invention was awarded a platinum medal by the Société d'encouragement pour l'industrie nationale, then he showed it at The Great Exhibition (1851) in London.
