= Alexandre-René Pignier =

French academic administrator (1785–1874)

- Born: 15 November 1785; Bagnolet, France
- Died: 8 February 1874 (aged 88); Paris, France
- Occupations: Doctor, teacher, author, and school administrator
- Employer: Institut National des Jeunes Aveugles

Alexandre-René Pignier (15 November 1785 – 8 February 1874) was a French school administrator and author. He was director of the Institution Royale des Jeunes Aveugles (today the Institut National des Jeunes Aveugles) in Paris between 1821 and 1840. His years as director were so consequential that he is known as the "second founder" of the institute. He introduced many improvements at the school and mentored Louis Braille, supporting his efforts to develop a new form of raised-point writing. He also wrote the first biography of Braille, as well as a history of the school.

== Early life ==
Alexandre-René Pignier was born in Bagnolet, Seine-Saint-Denis in 1785, the third child of Jean Mauxe Pignier, bailiff-auctioneer at the Châtelet in Paris, and Françoise Timothée Jerôme. Alexandre-René had two older sisters: Hortense Petronille Charlotte and Étiennette Rosalie Timothée. He trained as a doctor at the École de Médecine in Paris, graduating in 1813. As part of his studies, Pignier completed a thesis titled Essai sur l'influence que l'éducation morale peut avoir sur la santé (Essay on the influence that moral education can have on health).

== Career ==
Before being appointed director at the school for the blind, Pignier was a physician at the Séminaire de Saint-Sulpice in Issy (now Issy-les-Moulineaux), just outside Paris. In 1821, he was appointed director of the Institution Royale des Jeunes Aveugles, following the dismissal of Sébastien Guillié in February of that year. Pignier was 35 years old at the time of his appointment. The school was housed in the former St-Firmin seminary, an old building in poor condition on the rue St-Victor in the Latin Quarter that had been the site of a massacre during the French Revolution. His unmarried sister Étiennette came to live with him and acted as his housekeeper and companion during his time at the school, as well as an occasional teacher for the female students.

Pignier's first year at the school was marked by two important events. First, in April 1821, he introduced Charles Barbier's point-writing at the school. This prototypical form of writing with raised dots inspired Louis Braille to create his method of communication among blind people. Second, Pignier welcomed the founder of the school, Valentin Haüy, to a festival for St. Vincent de Paul in July and a concert in his honour in August. The previous director had refused to allow Haüy to visit the school; Pignier's recognition of the founder indicated a departure from the previous director's management.

Pignier had to strengthen the educational and vocational programs at the school, which had deteriorated under Guillié. School inspectors had also raised concerns about the health of the students. Pignier abolished corporal punishment and worked to improve remuneration and living conditions for the blind student-teachers known as répétiteurs, who were treated more like students and less like teachers.

Pignier introduced the teaching of history to the academic program and of the organ to the music program. His previous appointment in the seminary had introduced him to many priests in the city, many of them in need of church organists, so he was able to find placements for music students, including Louis Braille. He encouraged visits by professional musicians, such as Niccolò Paganini, and later instituted a course in piano-tuning. One student, Claude Montal, went on to become a piano manufacturer.

Pignier searched for a new site for the school, because the old, damp building endangered the health of the students. Fifty-five students died between Pignier's arrival at the school in 1821 and 1838. He succeeded in winning support for the project and securing a new site on the boulevard des Invalides. Construction of a new school began in June 1839. Unfortunately, Pignier's ambitious second-in-command, Pierre-Armand Dufau, lobbied to have Pignier removed from his position. Pignier formally retired on May 7, 1840, aged 54. It was Dufau, not Pignier, who presided at the ceremonial opening of the new school in 1844.

== Personal life ==
Although he was ignored by the new school administration, Pignier's students did not forget him and former students such as Louis Braille, Gabriel Gauthier, Protais Grosjean, and Hippolyte Coltat often came to visit him.

Pignier was a deeply religious man, very concerned with social welfare, particularly the welfare of young people. He served on the Conseil d'administration (board of governors) for a charitable venture called the Maison de Refuge des Jeunes Condamnés, founded in 1817. This organization helped young people under the age of fifteen who had been released from prison, until it closed in 1832. He later wrote a book about the institution and its founder, l'Abbé François-Xavier Arnoux.

Pignier died in Paris in February 1874, aged 88. He was buried in the Montparnasse Cemetery in Paris. In 1989, his remains were transferred to an ossuary in Père Lachaise.

== Selected publications ==
Pignier spent his retirement years writing books based on his experiences. He tended not to put his name on his publications, but the following books are known to be his work:

- Notices biographiques sur trois professeurs : anciens élèves de l'Institution des jeunes aveugles de Paris. Paris: Madame Veuve Bouchard-Huzard, 1859
- Notice historique sur l'abbé Arnoux et sur la maison de refuge des jeunes condamnés dont il a été le fondateur. Paris: Madame Veuve Bouchard-Huzard, 1859
- Renseignements pour servir à l'histoire d'une Société de charité ou de bonnes œuvres fondée et dirigée par l'abbé Legris Duval. Paris: Madame Veuve Bouchard-Huzard, 1861.
- Note relative à Descartes. Paris: Madame Veuve Bouchard-Huzard, 1867.
