= Pierre-Armand Dufau =

- Born: 15 February 1795; Bordeaux
- Died: 22 October 1877 (aged 82); Paris
- Occupations: Educator, journalist

Pierre-Armand Dufau (15 February 1795 – 22 October 1877), was the director of the Institution Royale des Jeunes Aveugles (today the Institut National des Jeunes Aveugles – the pioneering French school for the blind) between 1840 and 1855. He was also a prolific author.

== Early life ==
Pierre-Armand Dufau (or Duffau according to his birth record) was born on 15 February 1795 in Bordeaux, the son of Paul-Armand Duffau, farmer, and Marie Chicou. He completed his studies in Bordeaux, and became a schoolteacher. He joined the staff of the Institution Royale des Jeunes Aveugles in Paris in 1815, at the age of 20, on the invitation of the director, Sébastien Guillié, as the school was being reestablished at the time of the restoration of the French monarchy. In 1819, aged 24, he published Histoire générale de France, avant et depuis l’établissement de la monarchie dans les Gaules jusqu’à la paix générale en 1815 (A general history of France, before and since the monarchy, from the time of the Gauls to the peace of 1815). In 1823 in Versailles, he married Chérie Prudence Chaales des Étangs.

== Director of the Institution des jeunes aveugles ==
Dufau was a teacher at the school for the blind for 25 years, first under Guillié and, after 1821, Alexandre-René Pignier. He specialized in the teaching of geography. In 1836, in cooperation with a female teacher and the school’s accountant, Dufau wrote a report highly critical of the director, Pignier, addressed to the Ministry of Public Instruction. The three accused Pignier of having corrupted the students by teaching them history and by promoting the Catholic religion. Pignier was eventually forced to take early retirement, in 1840. Dufau took his place as director.

As director, Dufau oversaw the addition of new workshops, introduced gymnastics, established rules for the running of the school, standardized pensions, and created a charitable society to support and maintain blind people in France. Despite his harsh criticisms of the previous director, he maintained the general traditions of the school and most of the teaching staff.

One controversial change was Dufau’s opposition to the use of the writing method invented by Louis Braille. While Pignier was director, Louis Braille had developed his method of writing with raised dots for blind people; the method was very popular with the students at the school. Dufau suppressed its use in 1840, except for musical notation, and reintroduced raised letters for books used in the school. “He even had the school’s printworks cast new characters in imitation of those used at the institutes [for the blind] of Edinburgh and Philadelphia.” At the same time, Dufau destroyed many of the books printed when Guillié and Pignier were directors, which used the raised letters created by the founder of the school, Valentin Haüy.

Joseph Guadet, however, whom Dufau had chosen to be his assistant, noticed the importance of braille for the students. “He soon realized that braille was indeed more practical than embossed print. Guadet evidently convinced Dufau that this was the case.”

Although the former director, Pignier, had launched the construction of a new school building to replace the unhealthy old one, which was home to the school between 1815 and 1843, it was Dufau who presided over the opening of the new building on the boulevard des Invalides in February 1844. On the day of the ceremony, Guadet gave a speech about the merits of braille, including a demonstration of its use, and from that point on, braille was once again used at the school.

In recognition of his work with blind students, Dufau was made a Chevalier of the Legion of Honour in 1849 and a Chevalier of the Order of the Rose (Brazil) in 1853.

Dufau remained as director until 1855, when he retired after 40 years at the school, aged 60.

== Publications ==
According to Edgard Guilbeau, author of a history of the school, Dufau was more notable as a writer than as director of the school. The list of his publications is long and varied. He wrote articles for the journals Temps and Constitutionnel, and became director of the latter in 1834. He also contributed to Mercure du XIXe Siècle, the Revue encyclopédique, the Encyclopédie des gens du monde, and the Dictionnaire de la conversation. He was among the founders of the Annales de la charité.

Some of his more notable writings were :

Essai sur l'état physique, moral et intellectuel des aveugles-nés, avec un nouveau plan pour l'amélioration de leur condition sociale. Paris: Imprimerie royale, 1837.

Lettres à une dame sur la charité. Paris: Guillaumin, 1847.

Des aveugles : considérations sur leur état physique, moral et intellectuel, avec un exposé complet des moyens propres à améliorer leur sort. 2e ed. Paris: J. Renouard, 1850.

Souvenirs d'une aveugle-née, recueillis et écrits par elle-même. Paris: Jules Renouard et Cie, 1851.

Notice historique, statistique et descriptive sur l'Institution nationale des jeunes aveugles de Paris. Paris: Chez le concierge de l’Institution, 1852.

Essai sur la science de la misère sociale. Paris: J. Renouard, 1857.

== Death ==
Dufau died 22 October 1877 in Versailles, where he had lived with his wife since his retirement from the school. His wife died 30 April 1888 in Versailles. They had no children. Dufau is buried in Montparnasse Cemetery, Paris.

== Distinctions and decorations ==
Dufau was a member of the Academic Society of the Sciences in Paris from 1821 until its dissolution in 1826. He received the Montyon literary prize in 1837 and was recognized by the Academy of Sciences in 1840.
