= Thérèse-Adèle Husson =

French writer

Born into an upper-middle-class family in 1803, Thérèse-Adèle Husson was a French writer in the post-Revolutionary period. At the age of nine months, she became blind as a result of smallpox. She wrote more than a dozen children's novels. She also wrote an autobiography, dictated to two different writers, which was sent to the director of the Quinze-Vingts Hospital in 1825. This autobiography was later discovered by Zina Weygand in the hospital's archives, and with the assistance of Catherine Kudlick, Weygand translated the work and published it as Reflections: The Life and Writings of a Young Blind Woman in Post-Revolutionary France. The book is known for being the first French-language book by a blind person about blindness. Husson died in 1831 following severe burns received when her apartment caught on fire.

== Biography ==
Born in 1803 into a Middle class family, Thérèse Adèle Husson was blinded at the age of nine months by Smallpox. On February 1, 1826, she married Pierre-François-Victor Foucault, a musician and mechanic, alumnus of the National Institute for Blind Youth and inventor of the first braille printing machine, the raphigraphe. The couple had two daughters. Thérèse-Adèle Husson died in Paris on March 30, 1831 from burns caused by a fire in her unsanitary Apartment.

== See also ==
- Louis Braille, Braille
