= Gabriel Gauthier =

- Born: 15 February 1808; Briant
- Died: 27 June 1853 (aged 45); Paris
- Occupations: Musician, composer, teacher

Gabriel Gauthier (15 February 1808 – 27 June 1853) was an organist and composer, a teacher at the school for the blind in Paris, and a close friend of Louis Braille.

== Early life ==
Gauthier was born in 1808 in Briant, Saône-et-Loire, to Claude Gauthier, farmer, and Claudine Pequet, the second of four children (his siblings were Claudine Louise, Antoinette, and François). Before his first birthday, Gabriel lost his sight as the result of smallpox. He also lost his sense of smell, most of his sense of taste, and became slightly deaf in one ear.

Gauthier's father died when he was eight years old. His late father's brother, a priest, took care of young Gabriel, and secured his admission to the Institution Royale des Jeunes Aveugles (now the Institut National des Jeunes Aveugles) in Paris in 1818. After several months at the school, Gauthier had to return home to recuperate from an illness, but re-entered the school in 1820.

At the school, Gauthier became close friends with Louis Braille, and another student, Jean-Pierre Binet. Gauthier and Binet supported Braille's work on his raised-point writing system. According to the school's director, Alexandre-René Pignier, Gauthier worked on his own version of raised-point writing, but it has been lost.

Despite his slight deafness, Gauthier was a gifted musician. He studied violin, piano, and organ, and won several prizes at the school in music and other subjects.

== Teacher at the school ==
In 1830, when he was 22, Gauthier was appointed répétiteur – this was the title given to former students who became teachers after finishing their studies. (Louis Braille also fulfilled this role.) In this capacity, he taught grammar, arithmetic, and music. Gauthier's students included several who went on to become respected organists at leading churches in France.

== Musical career ==
From 1844 to 1851, Gauthier was conductor of the school orchestra and from 1846 to 1847, he served as maître de chapelle, conducting the choir and organizing chapel services.

Gauthier held the post of organist at Saint-Étienne-du-Mont in Paris from 1824 until his death in 1853. His compositions, including several masses and a Te Deum, were performed at the church. Although he was generally held in high regard, another composer, Stephen Morélot, once wrote in the Revue de la Musique Religieuse, Populaire et Classique that Gauthier had played a drinking song at the Easter service in 1838. Gauthier vigorously denied this accusation in the same publication and stated that the piece had been Jésus paraît en vainqueur. Sébastien Durand, in relating this incident, suggested that the disagreement reflects more on the quality of certain forms of religious music in use at the time than on the musician in question.

Louis Braille's writing method included a form of musical notation. The original version used dots and dashes, which musicians found difficult to use. Braille perfected the system for music in the 1830s, and Gauthier was one of the first to use it for his own compositions.

== Compositions and publications ==
Gauthier wrote many pieces of instrumental and vocal music. In a biographical sketch of Gauthier, the former director of the school, Alexandre-René Pignier, lists dozens of compositions, including instrumental works for flute, oboe, bassoon, clarinet, piano, and organ; chamber music and symphonies, and sacred choral music for use in the school chapel.

In 2017, a blind music professor in North Carolina, Harvey H. Miller, reprinted more than 30 of Gauthier's pieces in Recueil de morceaux d'orgue. The original pieces had been published in Paris in 1863. Miller wrote of the music: "Gauthier's pieces are generally homophonic in texture and feature strongly chromatic melodic motion." Some of these reprinted works were performed at the American Printing House for the Blind in 2013.

Gauthier also published textbooks in relief print to supplement his teaching at the school. Some of his books went on to be produced in regular type, and two are now available online.

Le mécanisme de la composition instrumentale, ou explications analytique de toutes les productions de musique instrumentale, 1845.

Considérations sur la question de la réforme du plain-chant et sur l'emploi de la musique ordinaire dans les églises, 1843.

== Death ==
Like Louis Braille, Gauthier died in his forties of tuberculosis, two years after Braille. Both had lived for many years in the old school building on the rue St-Victor in Paris, which was in poor condition and very damp. That experience permanently affected their health. Although the students moved to new quarters on the boulevard des Invalides in 1843, Gauthier's health was already declining. He was temporarily buried in Montparnasse Cemetery, but his remains were later removed to an ossuary.
