= Maurice de La Sizeranne =

Maurice de La Sizeranne (French pronunciation: [mɔʁis də la sizʁan]; 1857–1924), blinded at age nine, was an important figure in the movement to support the blind.

He was born in Tain, a small village in la Drôme, on the left bank of the River Rhône, on 30 July 1857. He was nine when he lost his sight in an accident whilst playing. He studied at the National Institute for the Young Blind, where he stood out for his musical talent. He was appointed as a music teacher there in 1878.

In 1878, an important International Congress was held for the improvement of the situation of the blind and the deaf-and-dumb. It recognised the supremacy of braille for written French and launched a debate on unifying the practice of contracting braille. Maurice de La Sizeranne was fascinated by this problem and worked on a new abbreviated way of writing braille. In 1880, he gave up his career to devote himself to his opus: the French contracted spelling primer for braille, which was published two years later.

Having decided to devote himself fully to the cause of the blind, he soon realised that, despite the undeniable progress made in educating the young blind over the past century, once they left the school, they found themselves left to their own devices and were deprived of any information that might help them to take up a career.

He wasted no time in launching a number of initiatives to remedy this state of affairs. He started by creating three periodicals: "Le Louis Braille" and "Le Valentin Haüy" in 1883, and "La revue braille" in 1884. Two years later, he created a braille library consisting initially of his own personal collection, which was subsequently expanded to include a braille music library. He invited to his home celebrities likely to be interested in the condition of the blind–teachers from the institute (INJA), inventors of apparatus and systems, headmasters of provincial or foreign institutions and so on. It was at one such meeting that the foundations were laid for the charity that was to become the Valentin Haüy Association. The Valentin Haüy Association was created on 28 January 1889 and accorded charitable status on 1 December 1891.

Thanks to his indefatigable commitment, his sense of organisation and numerous connections in the world of culture and welfare, in his full 28 years' activity as Secretary-General of the Valentin Haüy Association, Maurice de La Sizeranne saw through an accomplishment whose fame in the world of the visually impaired was to spread way beyond it. After a stroke, he withdrew from his post in 1917 and retired to his native region. When he had partly recovered, he followed the association's evolution until his death on 13 January 1924.

== Legacy ==
In 1936, the street separating the Institut National des Jeunes Aveugles (INJA) of the Association Valentin Haüy (AVH) in the 7ème arrondissement of Paris was named rue Maurice de La Sizeranne.

== Selected publications ==
- Les Aveugles utiles : accordeurs, professeurs, organistes, 1881 Texte en ligne
- J. Gaudet et les aveugles, sa vie, ses doctrines, ses écrits, 1885
- Les Aveugles, par un aveugle, 1889 Texte en ligne (Prix Montyon – 1889)
  - The Blind as Seen Through Blind Eyes. 1893; trans. from the 2nd French edition by P. Park Lewis
- Les Sœurs aveugles : I. Psychologie de la femme aveugle. II. La communauté des Sœurs aveugles de Saint-Paul, 1901
  - The Blind Sisters of St. Paul. 1907; trans. by L. M. Leggatt
- La Question des aveugles en 1910, notes et documents, 1910
