= Haüy =

Haüy can refer to several people:

- René Just Haüy (1743–1822), French mineralogist, brother of Valentin Haüy
- Valentin Haüy (1745–1822), French founder of the first school for the blind
