= Decapoint =

Obsolete tactile form of the Latin script

- Script type: Alphabet

A sample of decapoint. The relative efficiency of braille can be seen, as the line at the bottom is the braille transcription for the first two lines of decapoint: je vous prie de commander une planche pour la grille ci-jointe

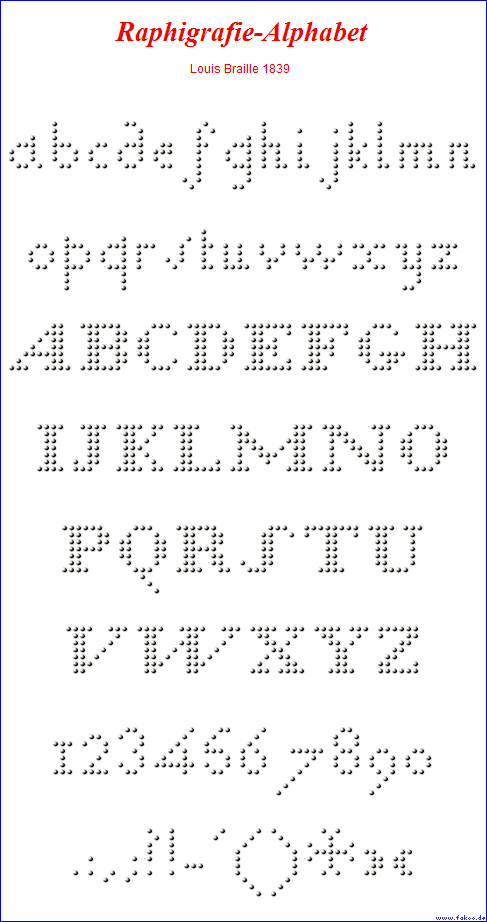
The decapoint alphabet, digits, and punctuation

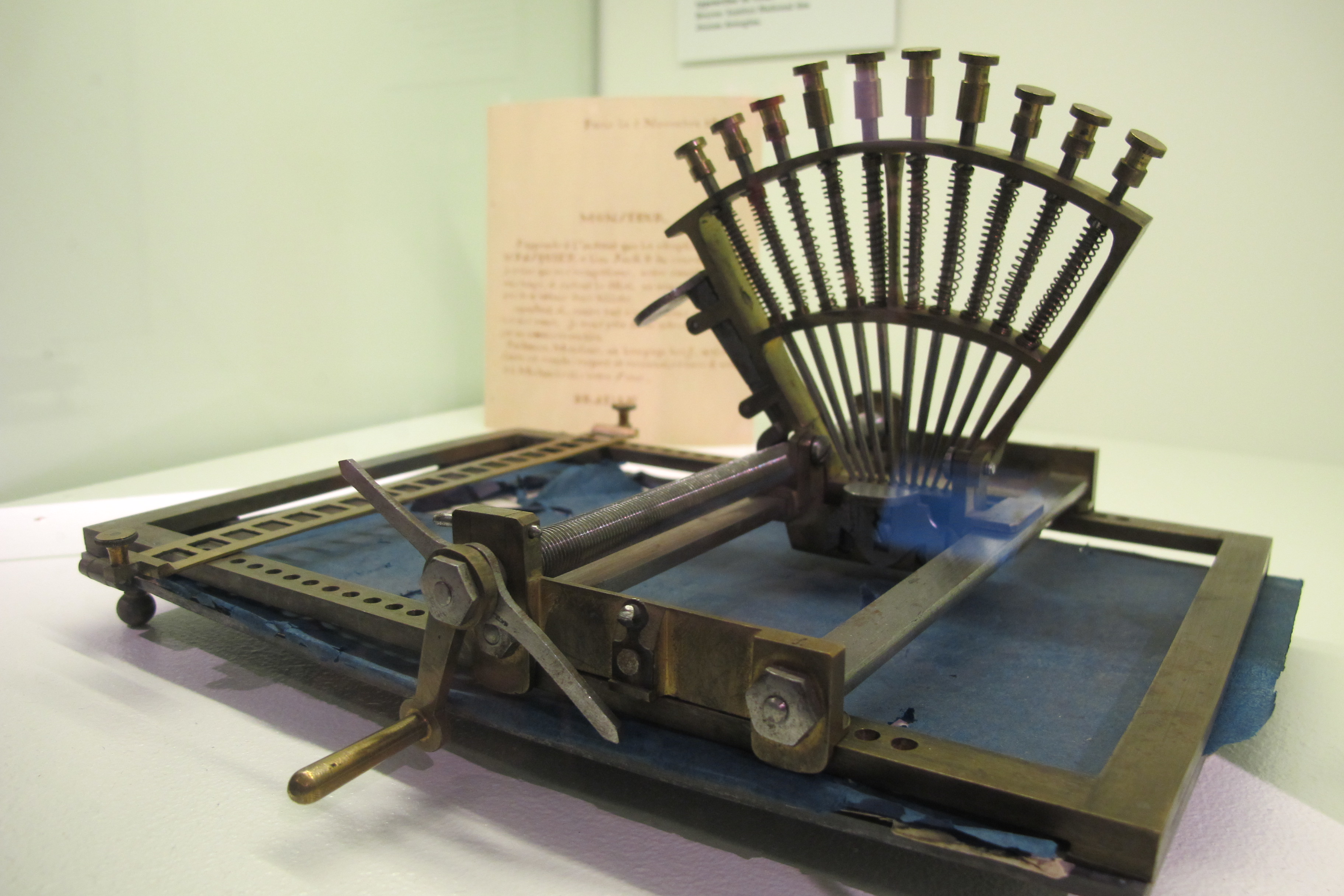
Raphigraphe on view in museum in Finland.

Decapoint, or Raphigraphy, was a tactile form of the Latin script invented by Louis Braille as a writing system that could be used by both the blind and sighted. It was published in 1839, over a decade after the six-dot braille alphabet. Letters retained their form, and so were legible without training to the sighted, but the lines were composed of embossed dots like those used in braille. "Decapoint" refers to the writing system, while "raphigraphy" is the use of a raphigraph machine to produce writing.

Each letter was ten dots tall with variable widths, hence the name decapoint. It was originally written with a slate and stylus; In order for writing to be legible from the front of a page, it was pressed in from the back as a mirror image. This process was difficult and time-consuming, and the text was impractically large.

In order to make the process of writing decapoint text easier, Pierre-François-Victor Foucault, assisted by Louis Braille, invented the raphigraph (needle-writer) in 1841. The raphigraph could write one column of a character at a time with its ten keys.

While decapoint had the advantage of being legible to sighted people without training, it was much less practical and space efficient. The prevalence of ink typewriters in the 1880s and the invention of the braille writer in 1892 contributed to decapoint and the raphigraph falling out of use. Decapoint was sometimes used anyway into the 1930s.
