= Claude Montal =

French piano tuner and piano maker

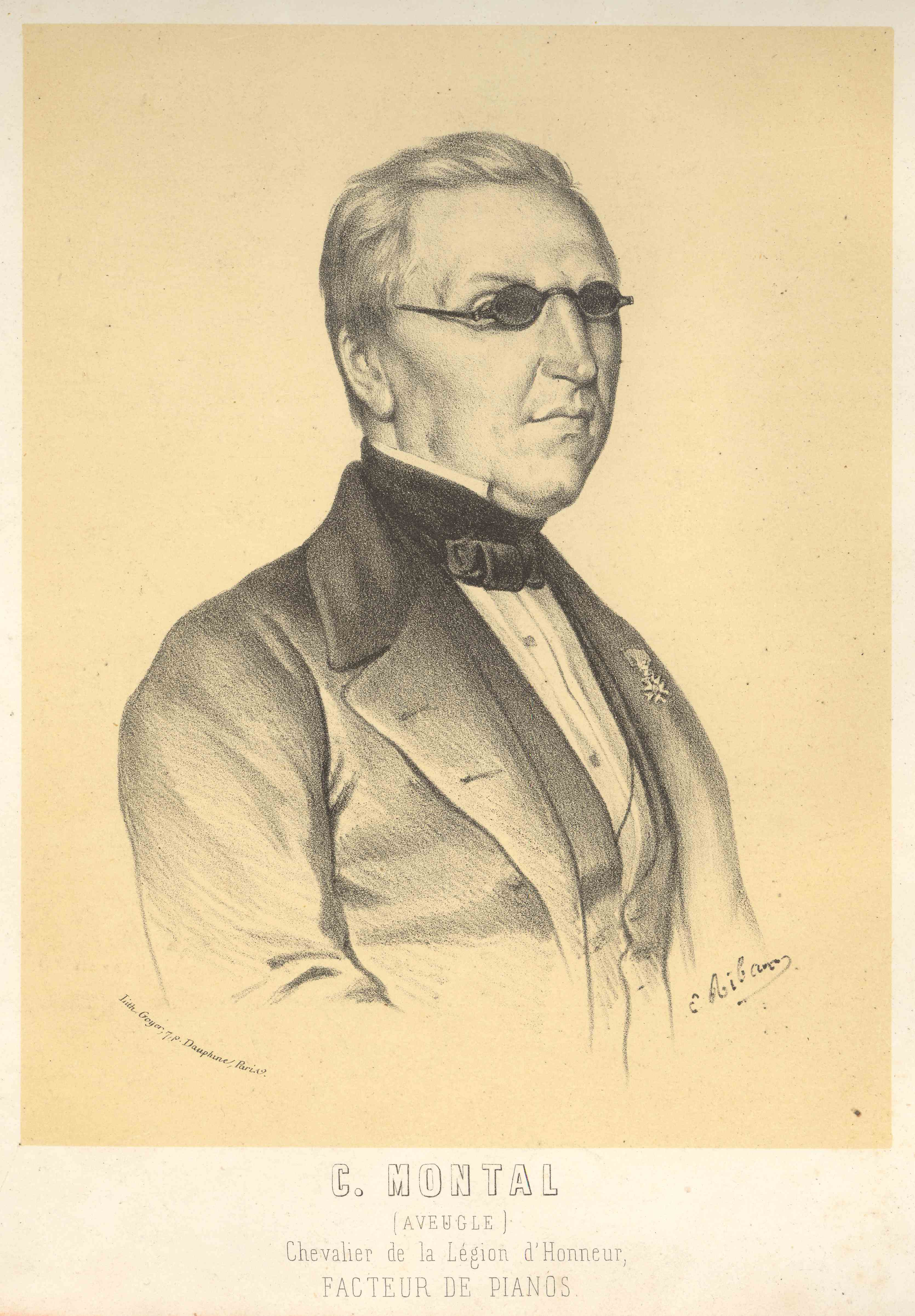
Portrait of Claude Montal (1800–1865)

Claude Montal (French: [klod mɔ̃tal]; 28 July 1800 – 7 March 1865) was a French piano technician and author who wrote the first comprehensive text on piano tuning and repair, "l'Art d'accorder soi-même son piano..." (The Art of Tuning Your Own Piano Yourself...), published in 1836. He subsequently became a major manufacturer of pianos, with several patented inventions to his credit. He lost his sight at a young age and helped to establish the career of piano technician as a profession well suited for blind people.

== Early life and education ==
Born in La Palisse, in central France, Claude Montal lost his sight at the age of five because of typhoid fever, but he continued to play actively with his friends and attend school. Montal's father was a saddlemaker, and he learned from his father the tools of the trade, which allowed him to manufacture items for sale.

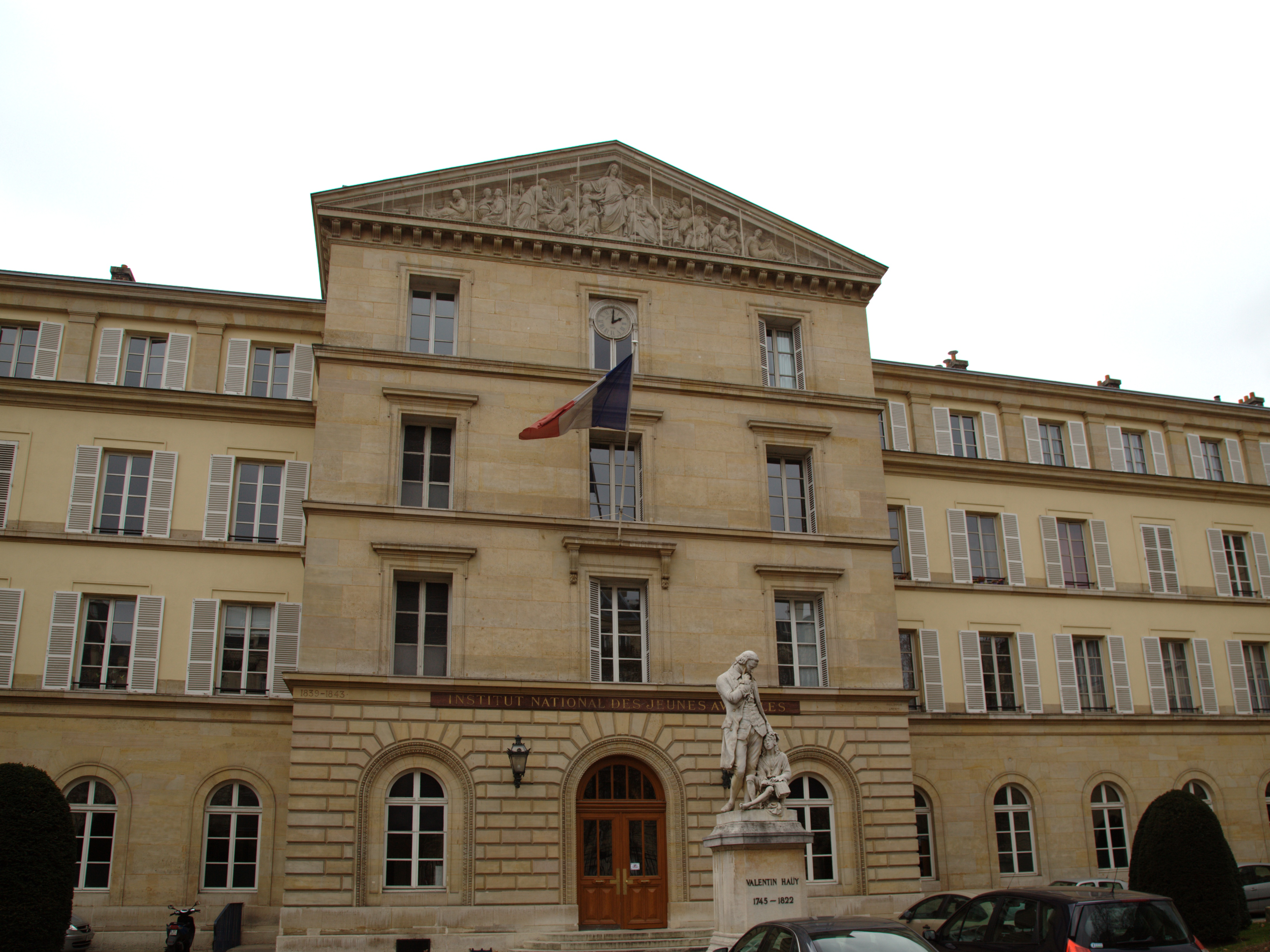
Institut National des Jeunes Aveugles, Paris

His parents tried for some years to have him admitted to the Institute for Blind Youth of Paris, a progressive institution that pioneered education for the blind, which gave them skills and knowledge to become independent members of society. His parents were unsuccessful until they were able to obtain the intervention of the Duchesse of Angoulême, a patron of the institute. He was 16 years old at the time, past the age limit for admission, so they claimed that he was 14.

Montal was a successful student, and by the age of 20 he had become a teacher at the institute, covering such subjects as grammar, geography, music, and mathematics. He contributed to the curriculum, developing a new way to teach solfeggio, and working on materials that could be sensed by touch. He developed relief charts for use in geometry and collaborated in creating an early system of musical notation.

Many of his colleagues spent their lives teaching at the institute, but Montal chose to pursue an independent life. An earlier student had managed to learn to tune pianos, and was successful in making a decent living at that trade, so Montal set out to learn those skills, at the same time teaching himself to dismantle and repair pianos. He hired someone to read to him everything he could find about the theory and practice of tuning, and soon had developed his own method of setting a temperament, based, as he put it, on both theory and practice.

== Independent life as piano technician, author, and manufacturer ==
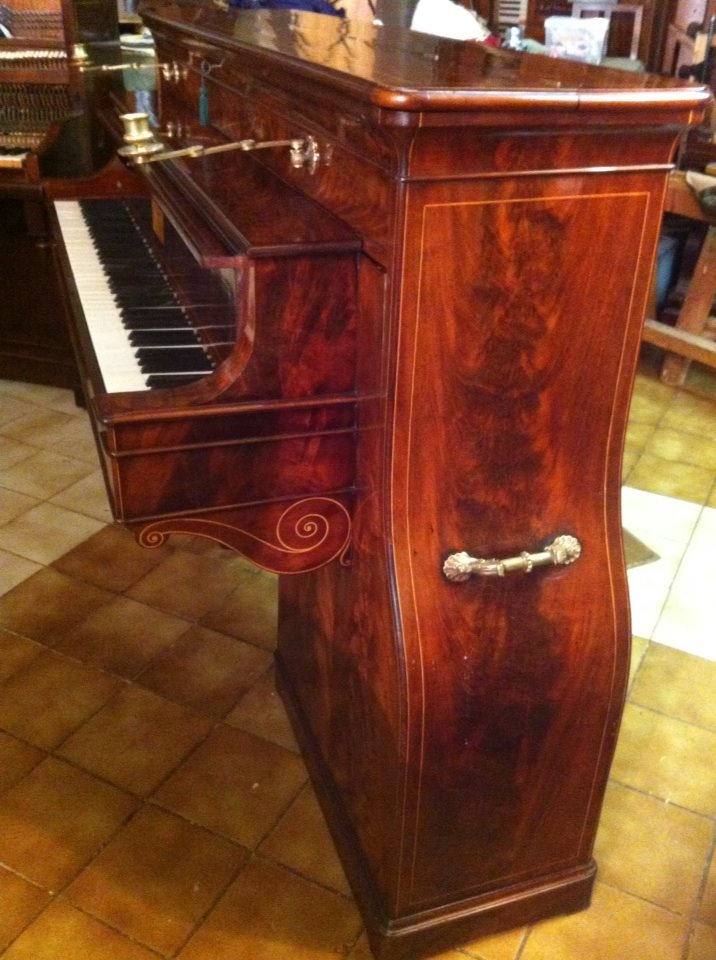
Early Montal upright piano

At the age of 30, Montal left the Institute and set off to make his living as an independent piano technician. He soon branched out into other areas, teaching classes in piano tuning at a piano store, and buying, repairing, and reselling used instruments. His tuning classes became the basis for a short book about tuning, "Abrégé de l'Art d'accorder soi-même son piano" (Brief version of the Art of Tuning Your Piano Yourself). This he sold at the Great Paris Exposition of 1834, and two years later expanded it into a much longer, more detailed work, published under the same name. In this expanded book, he covered a wide range of topics, including repairs and the history of the piano. Meanwhile, his piano-repair business had evolved into the manufacture of new pianos. He began with one helper in 1833, and by 1839 he had 13 employees and had completed 175 instruments. In 1844, he was making 90 pianos a year.

In the ensuing years, Montal gained a reputation for the quality of workmanship of his pianos, and was reviewed favorably by the musical press, who placed him in the ranks of the very best French piano manufacturers, just below the two best known firms of Pleyel and Érard. He concentrated his attention on various styles of upright piano, which was replacing the square piano as the predominant design. Montal developed his own features, beginning with double-escapement actions for uprights (an adaptation of Sébastien Érard's invention for grands), and later developed a system for transposition of the keyboard, and the use of adjustable iron bars to stabilize the instrument when subjected to climate change. He also produced very decorative instruments, seeking inroads into the luxury market.

== Exhibitions and awards ==
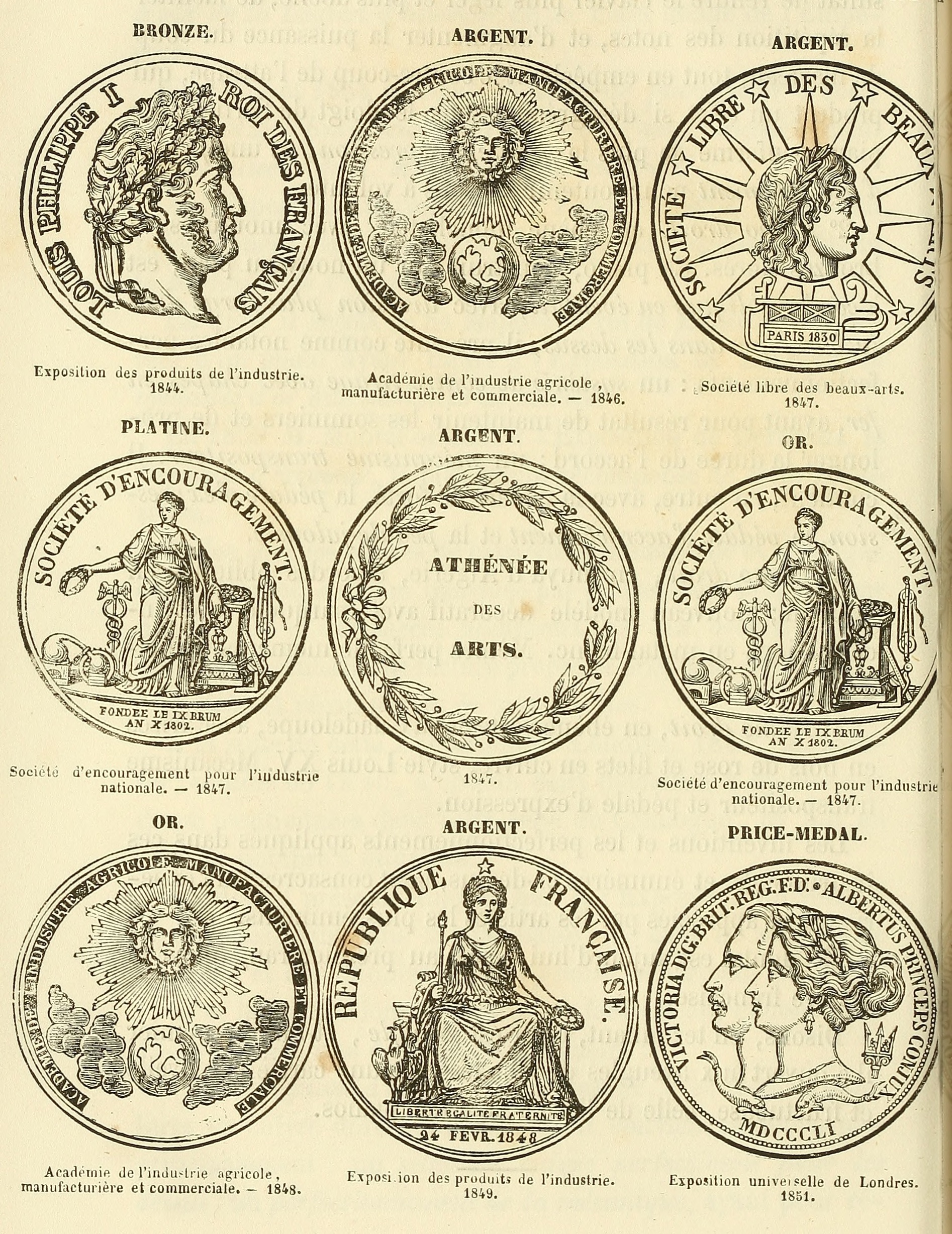
Medals received by Montal

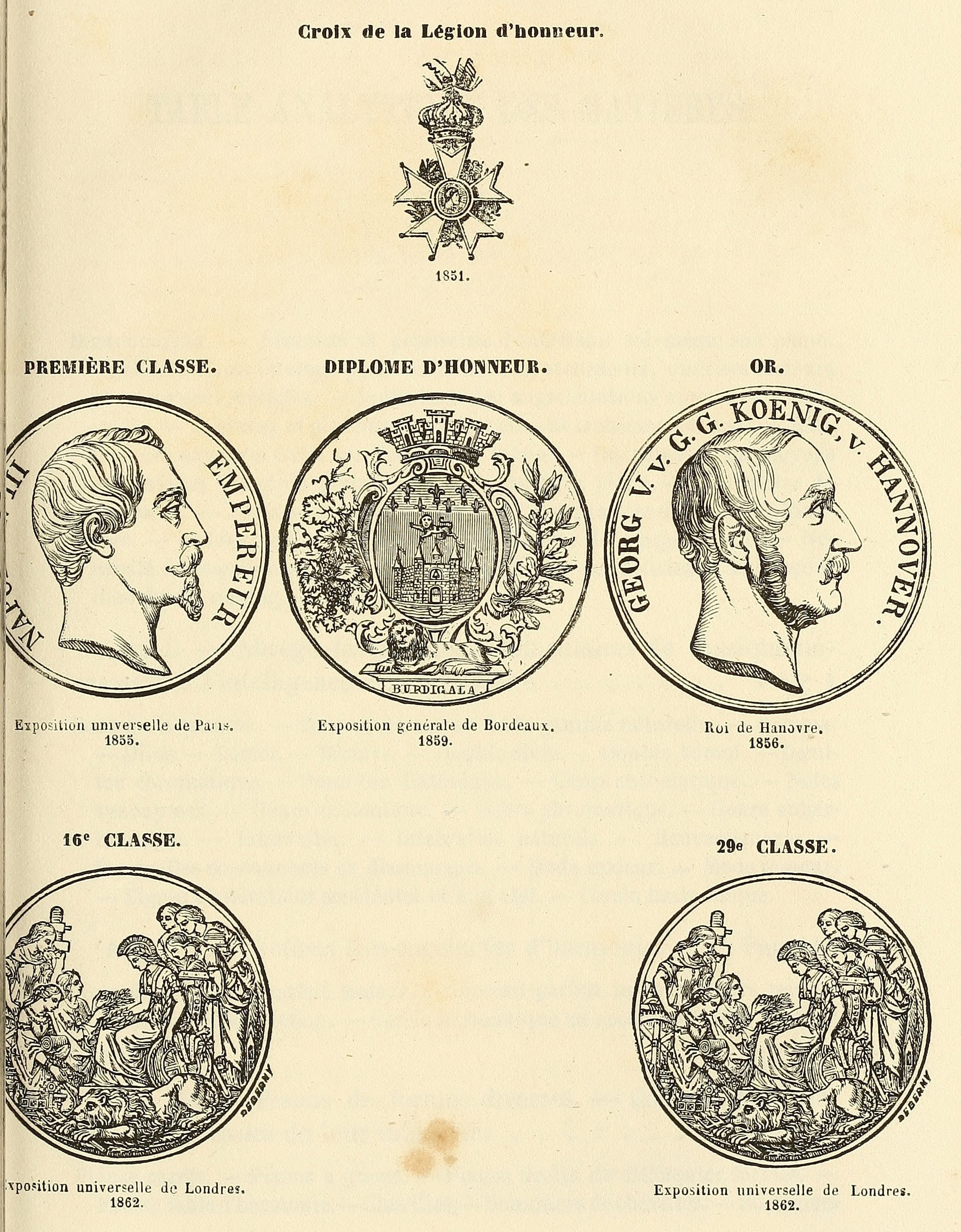
Montal's Medals

Beginning in 1839, Montal exhibited his own pianos at the Industrial Expositions of Paris, showing off his own, patented inventions in piano and action design. He received his first award (a bronze medal) at the French Industrial Exposition of 1844; was awarded the prize medal at the 1851 International Exposition in London, often called The Great Exhibition; a first class medal at the 1855 International Exposition in Paris; and two additional medals at the 1862 International Exposition in London. Montal received several additional awards, fourteen in all, including that of the Legion of Honor, in 1851.

Montal received recognition as official supplier of pianos to the Institute for Blind Youth of Paris, as the result of a competition in which the names of the makers were concealed. He later gained the title of official supplier of pianos to the Emperor and Empress of France and to the Emperor of Brazil.

== Inventions and innovations ==
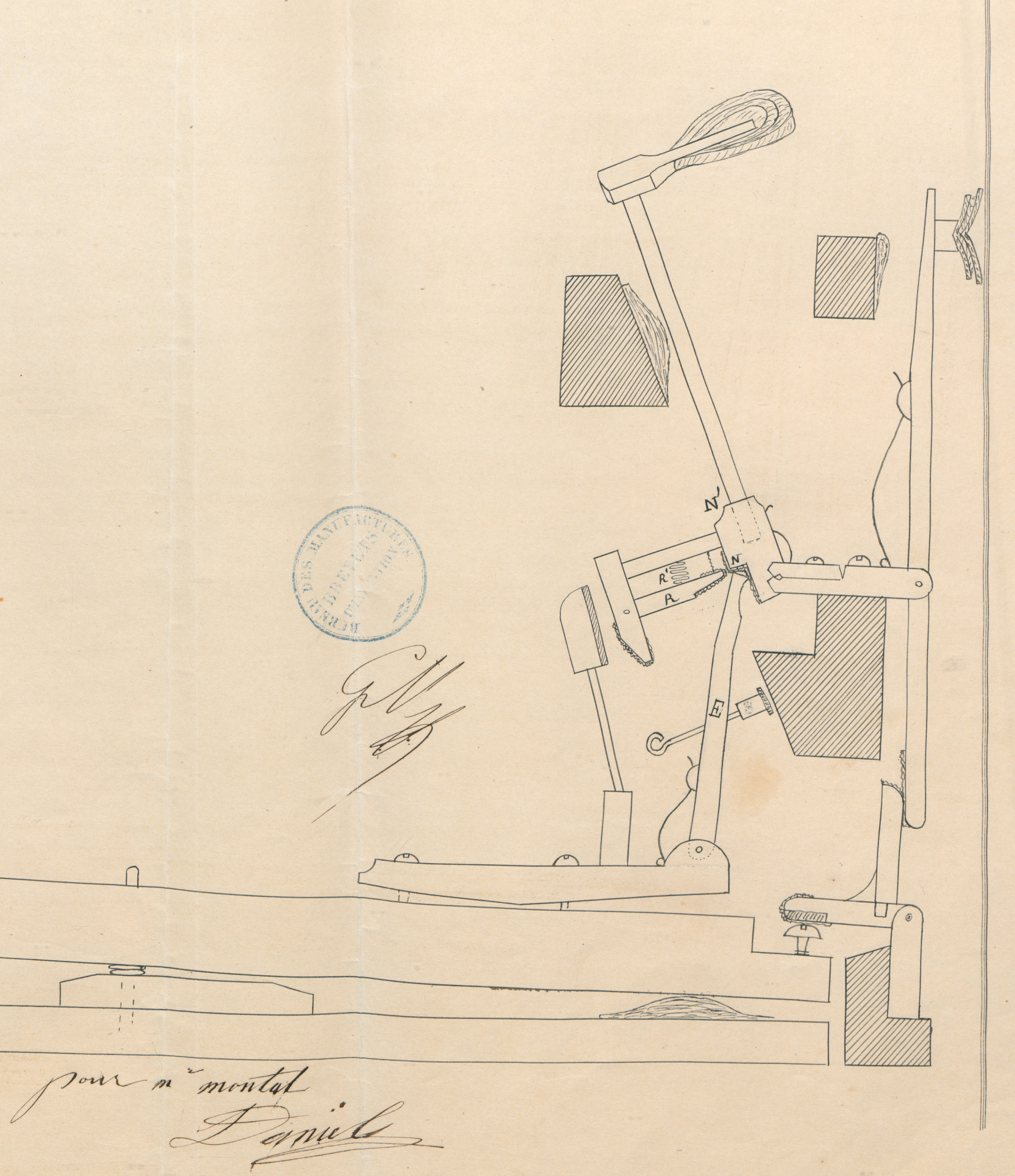
Montal Upright Repetition Action

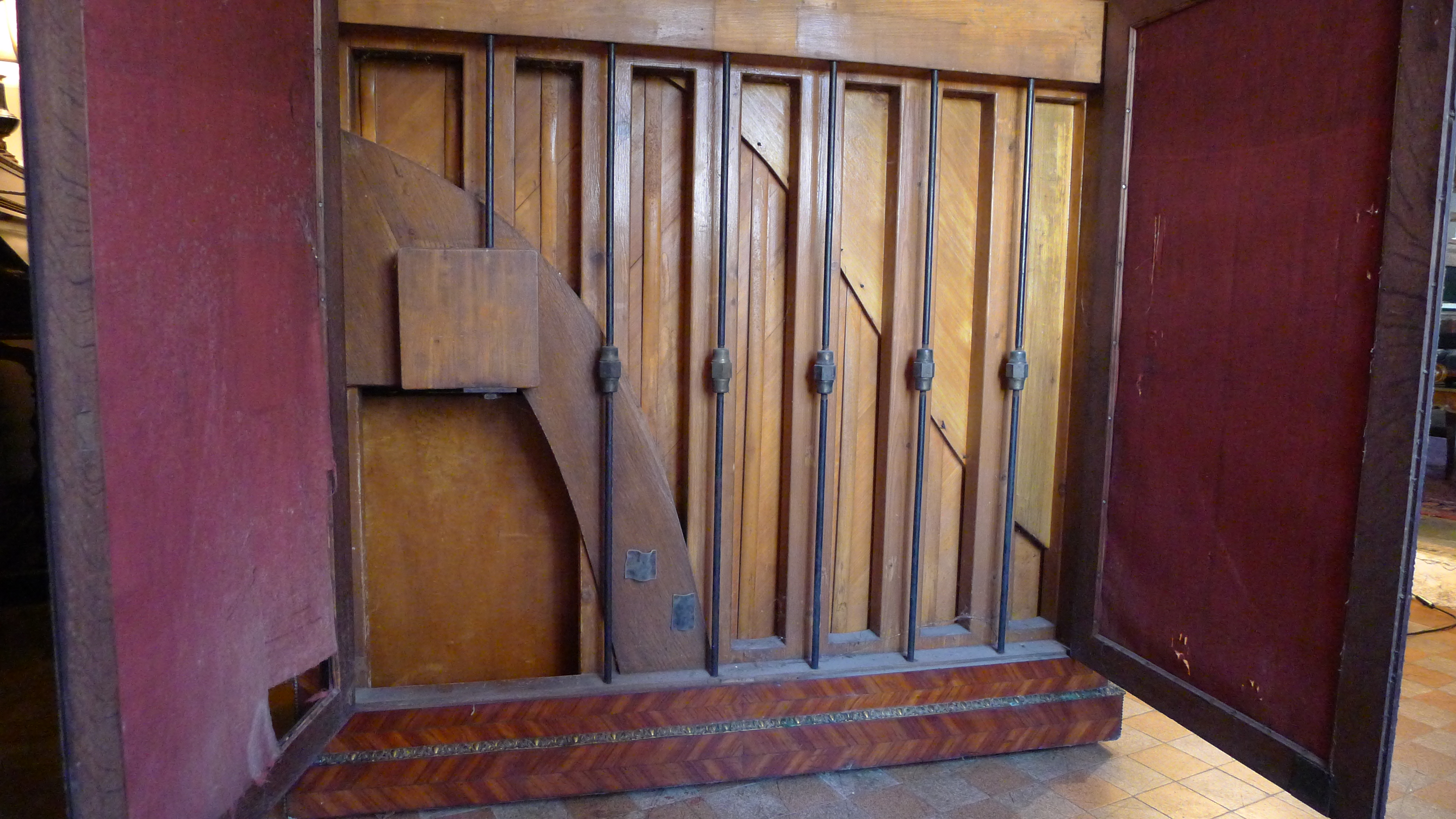
Montal's "Counter-tension" system

Montal's patented inventions included double escapement (repetition) action designs for both grands and upright; a grand piano with inverted soundboard (the soundboard above the strings); a transposition system whereby the piano keyboard could be shifted sharp or flat by several semitones; a system of adjustable iron bars (contre-tirage/counter-tension) to allow for adjustment of the case to match environmental condition; a soft pedal (pédale d'expression) that moved the hammers closer to the string and reduced key dip proportionally; and others.

He was often credited, erroneously, with invention of the sostenuto pedal, which the Boisselot brothers invented in 1844. However, the Boisselots did not pursue their invention, and Montal included his own adaptation of that mechanism in his pianos, including a version for uprights, and exhibited pianos with sostenuto pedal at the International Expositions of 1851, 1855, and 1862.

== Books ==
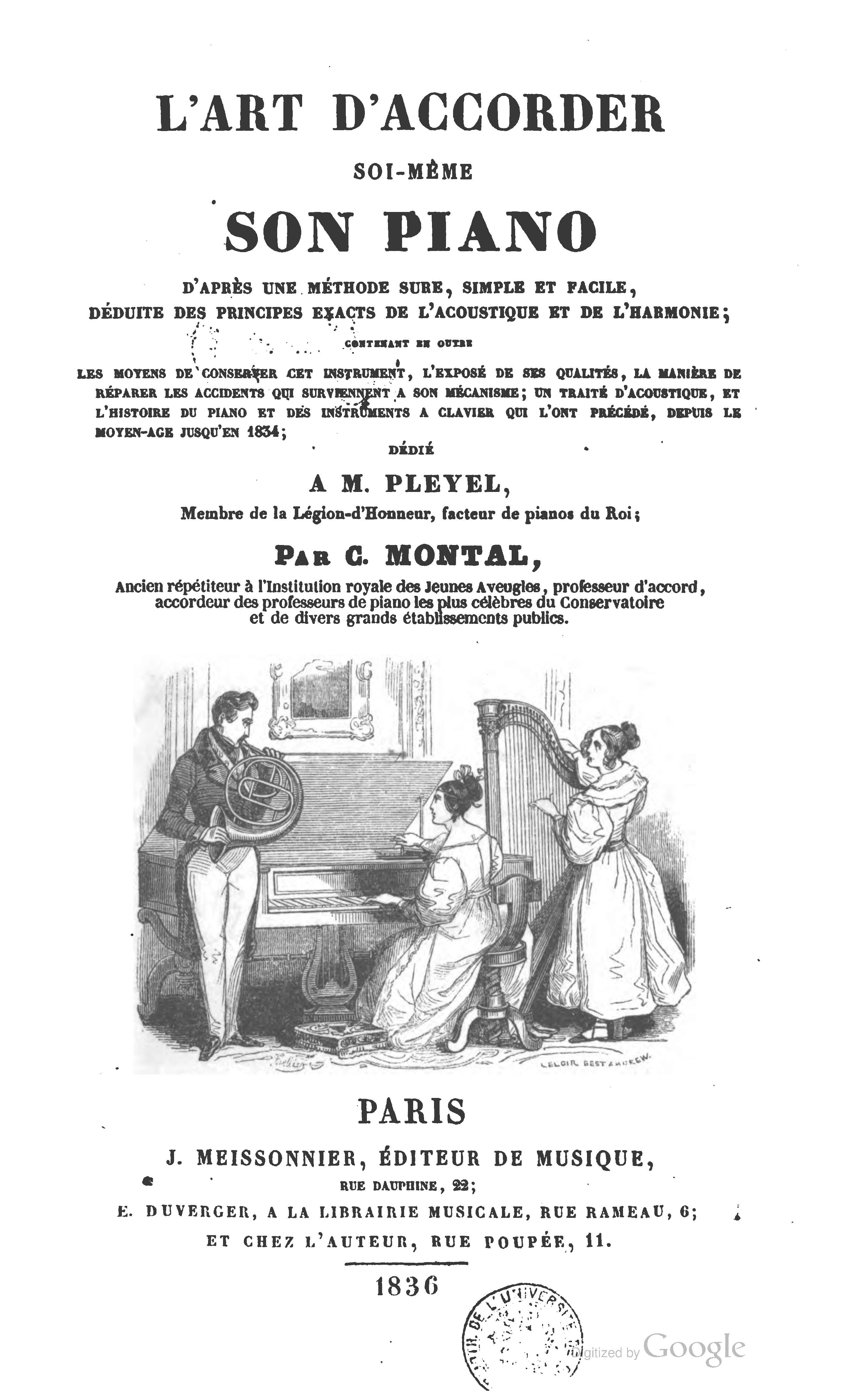
Art of Tuning title page, 1836

Montal's first book, published in 1834, was twenty pages long, solely on the topic of piano tuning. It was intended to help individuals to learn to tune their own pianos, or at least to fill in when a professional tuner was not available. Its full title is very descriptive: "l'Art d'accorder soi-même son piano, d'après une méthode sure, simple et facile, déduite des principes exacts de l'acoustique et de l'harmonie" (The Art of Tuning Your Own Piano Yourself, by a Sure, Simple and Easy Method, Deduced from Precise Principles of Acoustics and Harmony).

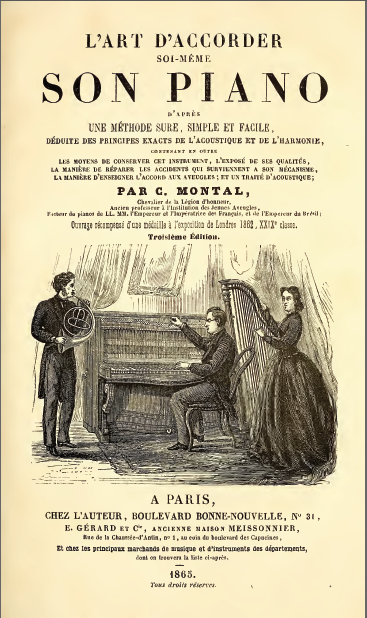
Art of Tuning title page, 1865

This book was translated into German the following year, 1835, and the German version remained in print for many years. It was subsequently translated into Czech (1836) and Dutch (1847).

In 1836, Montal expanded his original book to over 250 pages, and included detailed chapters on a variety of subjects: how to replace a string; the various repairs needed to keep a piano functioning; descriptions of various models and styles of pianos and how to tune and work on them; general advice about the care of the piano (keeping it covered, avoiding moisture and sun); how to pack a piano for moving; and many similar subjects. He also included a detailed chapter on acoustics, in which he laid out the mathematics behind equal temperament, demonstrating how his own system for tuning was in keeping with science. In addition, he appended a "History of the Piano", in which he traced its origins, and wrote in detail of the changes and developments during the early 19th century. The title of this expanded book remained the same, except that additional descriptive words were added to cover the full contents.

In 1865, Montal published a revised version, which brought his initial book up to date, covering the changes that had taken place in the intervening 30 years. He added a new chapter on the training of blind people in the profession of piano tuner/technician, and he also included a new appendix, in which he documented his own life, quoting from reviews of his book, and from reports concerning his pianos (leading to medals and awards).

He died in 1865 in Paris.

== Training for blind people ==
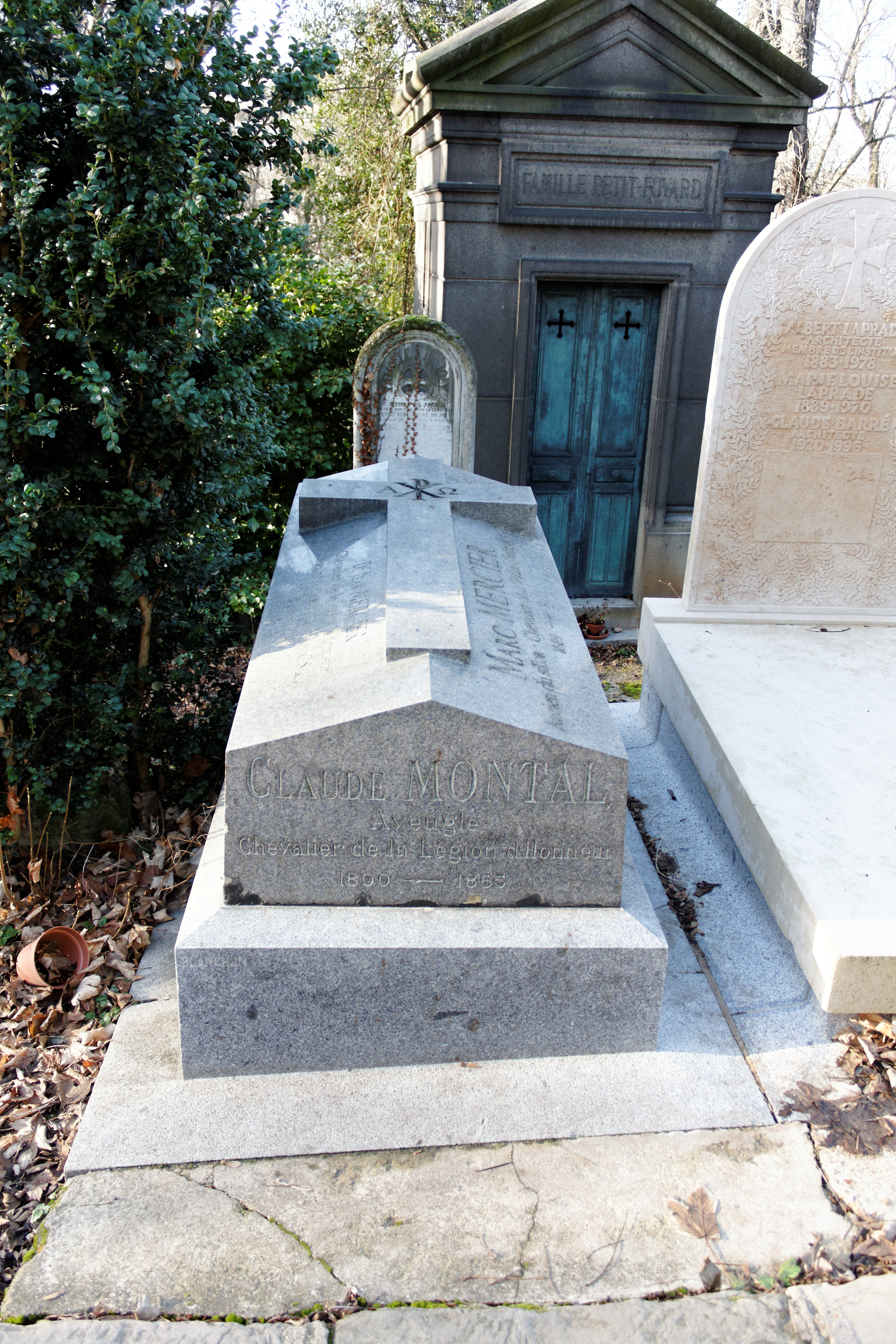
Tomb of Claude Montal, Père Lachaise cemetery

One of Montal's lasting legacy was the establishment of the profession of piano technician as a skill well suited for blind people. He worked closely with the Institute for the Young Blind in establishing a training program that has continued up to the present day and has been imitated around the world. In the 1860s, it was an intensive three-year program of study with some 250 students. Montal was tireless in promoting the employment of the program's graduates by his fellow manufacturers, noting that they were the only tuners who had actually been trained to understand the theory behind the practice. He was adamant in his opinion that blind students should learn to use tools of all sorts, so as to be able to make the many necessary repairs and adjustments as well as tune.

== Bibliography ==
- Anders, G.-E., Revue et Gazette Musicale de Paris, August 1, 1839.
- Annuaire Musicale (Entry on Montal: pp 190-196), d'Aubusson et Kugelmann, Paris 1857
- Armitage, T.R., The Education and Employment of the Blind. Harwick, London, 1871.
- Catalogue Français de l'Exposition Universelle de Londres, Paris, 1862.
- Dufau, F. et al., "Claude Montal, Facteur de Pianos, sa vie et ses travaux." Didot, Paris 1857.
- Exposition des Produits de l'Industrie Française en 1844, Rapport du Jury Central, Paris, 1844.
- Fétis, F.-J., Revue et Gazette Musicale de Paris, October 19, 1851.
- Foucaud, Édouard, Les Artisans Illustres (Entry on Montal: pp 559-563). Dupin et Blanqui, Paris 1841
- Guadet, M., "Notice Biographique sur Claude Montal, Facteur de Pianos." Fain et Thunot, Paris 1845.
- La France musicale, Paris, Jul 13, 1851.
- Lausac, Henri, Galerie historique et critique du dix-neuvième siècle. Volume 1 (Entry on Montal: pp 609-616), Galerie Historique, Paris 1861
- Lucas, M. Al. Panorama de l'Industrie Francaise (Entry on Montal: pp 111-113). Caillet, Paris 1839.
- Montal, Claude, Abrégé de l'Art d'accorder soi-même son piano. Meissonnier, Paris 1834
- Montal, Claude, l'Art d'accorder soi-même son piano. Meissonnier, Paris 1836.
- Montal, Claude, l'Art d'accorder soi-même son piano, 3me édition. Gérard et cie., Paris 1865.
- Montal, Claude (H. R. Reinhold, tr), Korte en duidelijke, op vaste regelen der acustiek en harmonie gegronde, aanwijzing om zelf de piano-forte te leeren stemmen, I.J. Malga, Nijkerk 1847
- Montal, Claude (Jan Pravoslav Přibík, tr), Krátké a pochopitelné nawedenj k laděnj, čili, Sauhlasowánj Forte-Piana, Marek Berry, W Praze 1836
- Montal, Claude (F. Wilke, tr.), Kurz gefasste Anweisung das Piano Forte selbst stimmen zu lernen... B. Shott's Söhne, Berlin 1835
- Möring, Michel, Les Conteurs en Famille (Chapter on Montal: pp 78-99), J. Vermot, Paris 1860
- Revue et Gazette Musicale de Paris, Paris, November 30, 1851.
- Revue et Gazette Musicale de Paris, Paris, November 18, 1855.
- Sturm, Fred, "Claude Montal, the First Piano Technician: Introduction," Piano Technicians Journal v. 55 no 9, Sept 2012, pp 22–25
- Sturm, Fred, "Claude Montal, the First Piano Technician: Montal's Tuning Method," Piano Technicians Journal v. 55 no 10, Oct 2012, pp 14–17
- Sturm, Fred, "Claude Montal, the First Piano Technician: Repairs," Piano Technicians Journal v. 55 no 11, Nov 2012, pp 14–16
- Sturm, Fred, "Claude Montal, the First Piano Technician: Montal's Contribution to Piano History," Piano Technicians Journal v. 55 no 12, Dec 2012, pp 14–16
- Sturm, Fred, "Claude Montal, the First Piano Technician: Montal the Piano Manufacturer and Inventor," Piano Technicians Journal v. 56 no 1, Jan 2013, pp 15–17
- Sturm, Fred, "Claude Montal, the First Piano Technician: Recognition and Influence," Piano Technicians Journal v. 56 no 2, Feb 2013, pp 14–17
