= Zina Weygand =

French historian (born 1945)

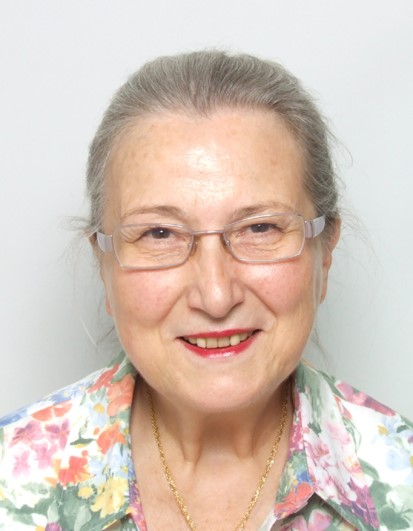
- Born: 23 April 1945 (age 80)

Zina Weygand (born April 23, 1945) is a French historian and emeritus researcher at the Conservatoire national des arts et métiers. She obtained her PhD from University Paris 1 in 1998.

Weygand is a specialist of disability history, especially the history of blind people in France from the Middle Ages to the beginning of the 20th century. She is part of the Annales School, and her scholarship focuses on the history of individual and collective representations of blindness, organisations supporting blind people, and the pedagogical techniques developed for blind pupils during the 18th and 19th century.

She was born in Paris.

== Research themes ==
Weygand has extensively published about the history of education for blind people. In her history of blind people in France, she examines the evolution of collective perceptions of blind people, from duplicitous beggars or powerless people needing Christian charity in the Middle Ages, to educable subjects in the late 18th century. She argues the interest of Enlightenment philosophers for the mechanisms of perception (especially John Locke and Denis Diderot) has driven the support of French philanthropists, enabling Valentin Haüy to open the first school for the blind.

Weygand has also published long-forgotten memoirs and archives, such as the memoir of Thérèse-Adèle Husson, enabling scholars to better understand experiences of blind people of the past.

== Publications ==
- The Blind in French Society from the Middle Ages to the Century of Louis Braille, Stanford University Press, 2009
- Les causes de la cécité et les soins oculaires en France au début du XIXe siècle (1800-1815), Paris, CTNERHI, diffusion PUF, 1989, 332 p11.
- Jacques Lusseyran, entre cécité et lumière, Marion CHOTTIN, Céline ROUSSEL, Zina WEYGAND (dir.), Paris, Éditions Rue d'Ulm, Presses de l'École normale supérieure, 2019, 232p12

== Recognition ==
- 2014: knight of the French Legion of Honour,

== Notes and references ==
Content in this edit is partially translated from the existing French Wikipedia article at Zina Weygand; see its history for attribution.
