= Musée Valentin Haüy =

Museum in Paris, France

Valentin Haüy Museum
- Musée Valentin Haüy
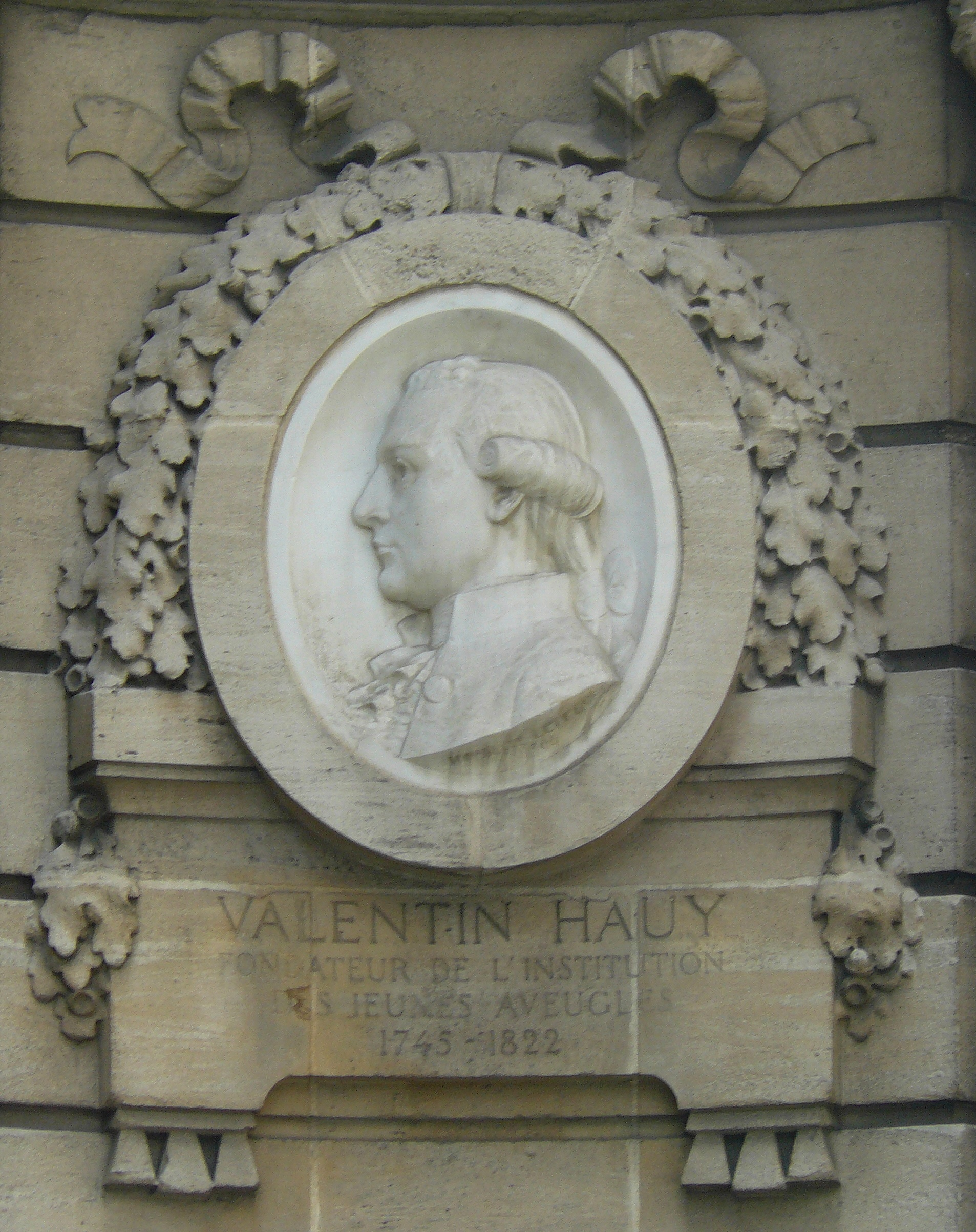
- Established: 1886
- Location: Paris, France
- Coordinates: 48°50′52″N 2°18′51″E
- Type: museum
- Founder: Edgard Guilbeau

The Musée Valentin Haüy (English: Valentin Haüy Museum) is a private museum dedicated to tools and education of the blind, and located in the building of the Valentin Haüy Association, in the 7th arrondissement of Paris at 5, rue Duroc, Paris, France. The museum is open by appointment without charge.

The museum was established in 1886 by Prof. Edgard Guilbeau of the Institut National des Jeunes Aveugles, and named in honor of Valentin Haüy (1745–1822), founder of the first school for the blind. It is now operated by the Association Valentin Haüy. The museum contains objects, equipment, and books from 1771 to the present day that document the history of tools and education for the visually impaired.

== See also ==
- List of museums in Paris
