= French Industrial Exposition of 1834 =

Exposition des produits de l'industrie française
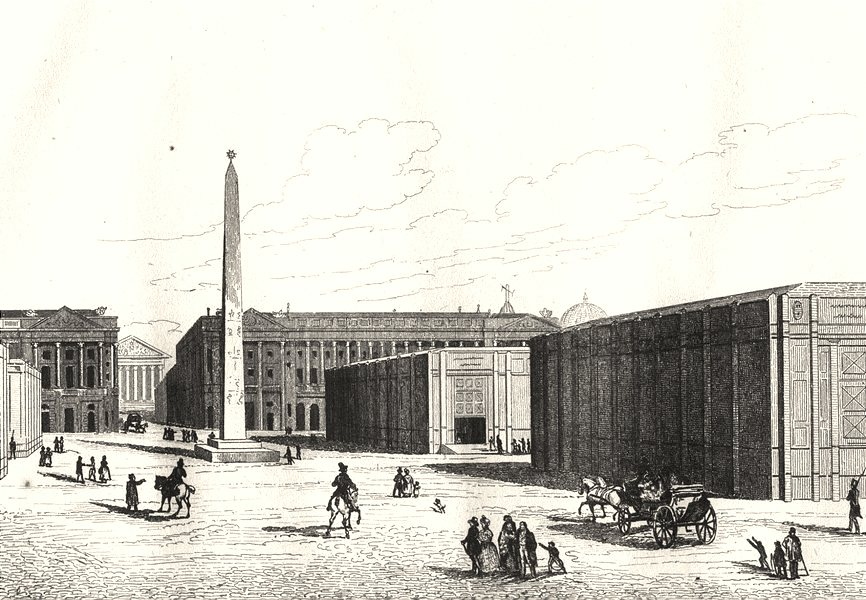
- Buildings for the 1834 exposition

Overview
- BIE-class: Unrecognized exposition
- Name: Exposition des produits de l'industrie française
- Area: 14,288 square metres (1.4288 ha)

Location
- Country: France
- City: Paris

Timeline
- Opening: 1 May 1834
- Closure: 30 June 1834

The French Industrial Exposition of 1834 (French: Exposition des produits de l'industrie française en 1834) was the eighth in a series of eleven French national industrial expositions held to encourage improvements in progressive agriculture and in technology, that had their origins in 1798.

== Preparations ==
Four large buildings were designed for the 1834 exposition by M. Moreau and erected in the Place de la Concorde between La Madeleine and the Palais Bourbon. The buildings had simple exterior decoration and were generally well-made, apart from some problems with rain leaking in. Each building was divided into four 13 metres (43 ft) long aisles and contained a 50 by 21 metres (164 by 69 ft) courtyard.

Commissioner Thiers notified the departmental prefects of the criteria for submissions, saying that the exhibits should mainly be products for the masses, and ideally would combine high quality and low price. Entries were divided into categories of use: food and food preparation; health; weaving processes and clothing; home products; transportation; products for smell, hearing, etc.; calculation, measurement and applied engineering; education and training; and social amenities. The categorization caused confusion among the visitors.

== Exposition ==
The exposition ran from 1 May 1834 to 30 June 1834. There were 2,447 exhibits in an area of 14,288 square metres (153,790 sq ft). Charles Dupin of the Institut Français, a famous statistician, was named rapporteur for the central jury of 1834. For each branch of industry he noted the quantities and value of French exports and imports, with comparative figures for 1823, 1827 and 1834. The exposition lasted 60 days, with 2,447 exhibitors.

== Products and awards ==
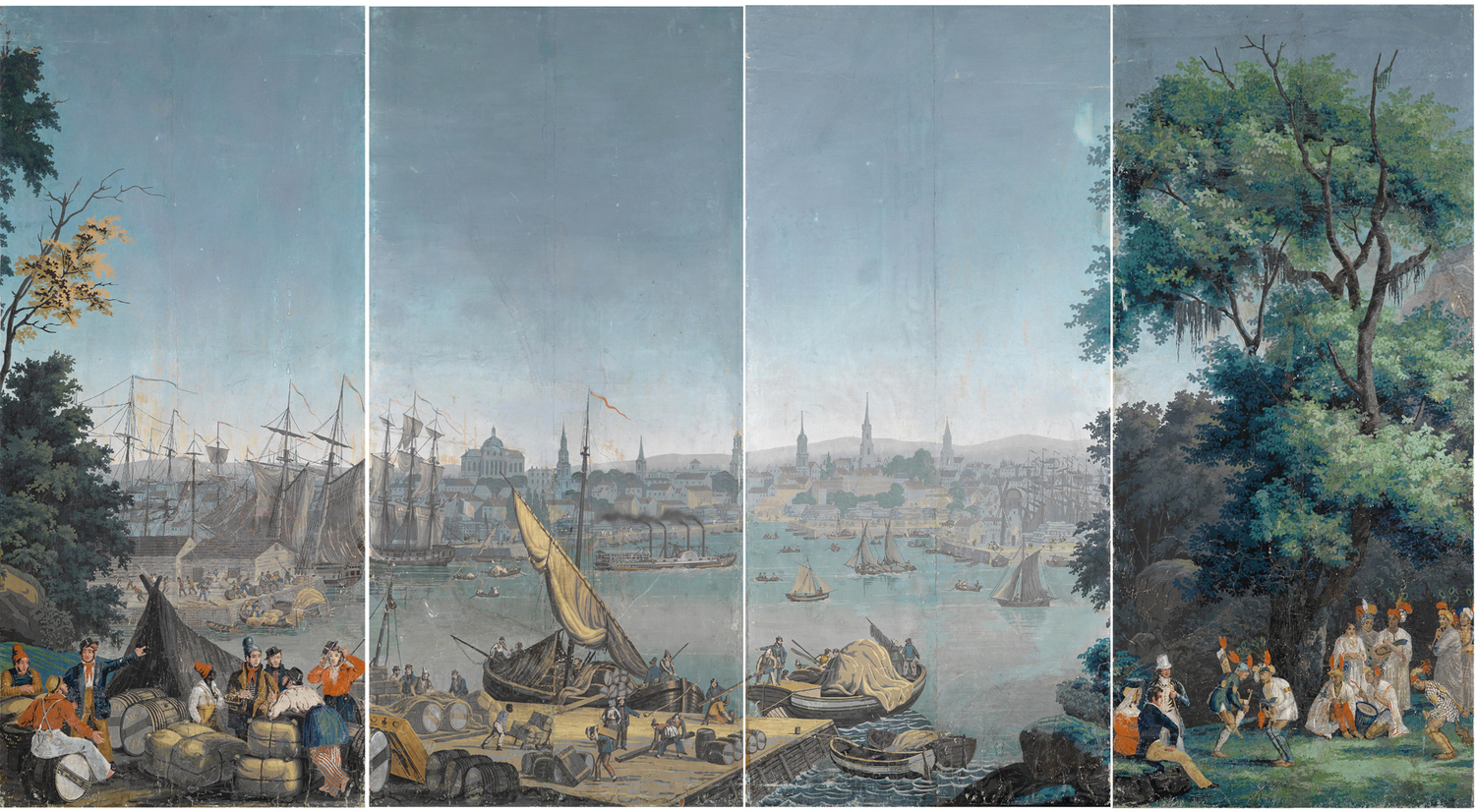
Zuber & Cie wallpaper series – Scenes from North America

There were almost 50 stands of textile manufacturers, mostly from Paris but with a dozen from other parts of France. Products included different types of cotton: fine sewing cotton, and cotton for embroidery, knitting, laces, cords and ropes. There were also wool and leather products. M. Delangre sold "Anticrotte" shoes, which protected against the mud of the street, M. Gudin sold waterproof shoes and M. Nadal sold elegant ladies' shoes. A variety of laces were exhibited, for dresses, scarves and collars. Madame Roche provided new corsets to always maintain even the most defective figure in an agreeable position, while Madame Thorel showed corsets for pregnant women. There were also stands of carpets, ribbons and sheets.

Many exhibitors displayed colors for painters, decorators and dyers. M. Bosc showed indelible ink that resisted all chemical agents. A variety of oils, soaps, salts and waxes were shown. Pianos were the main feature of the musical instruments section, including square, three-sided and upright pianos, grand pianos and pianos with from three to seven octaves. There were also harps, wind instruments, violins and guitars. Other exhibitors included inventors of medical appliances, watchmakers, cabinetmakers, chimney sellers, engravers, pump sellers, cutlers, goldsmiths, jewelers, roofers and paper sellers.

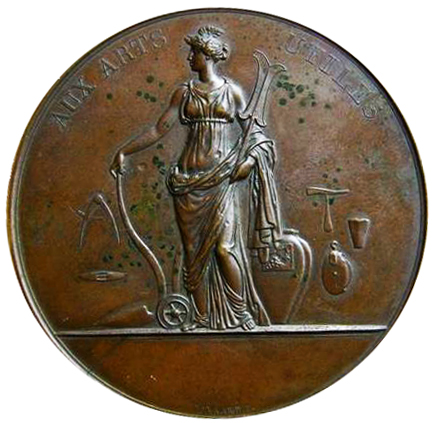
Bronze medal celebrating The Useful Arts

The innovative products included mass-printed rolls of wallpaper made by Zuber & Cie in Mulhouse. Automation in the areas of wood engraving, enameling and wood-inlaying created reduced-cost products that formerly only the wealthy could afford. The most revolutionary product was "elastic tissue", or sheets of rubber, for which there seemed to be great potential although the use was unclear. There were 1,785 awards, including:

- Bronze Medal: Auguste Dupont
- Bronze medal: Claude Montal.

The central jury awarded the Comte de Pontgibaud a gold medal for his mining enterprise, the precursor of the Société des mines et fonderies de Pontgibaud. Robert Flavigny et fils, which had won a gold medal for its fabrics in the 1827 Exposition Nationale, presented new fabrics. The company again won a gold medal, and its owner Robert Flavigny received a Legion of Honour. Other manufacturers from Elbeuf also won awards in 1834 and the subsequent expositions.

== Publications ==
Publications by or about the exposition included:

- Notice des produits de l'industrie française : précédée d'un historique des expositions antérieures et d'un coup d'oeil général sur l'exposition actuelle..., Paris: impr. d'Éverat, 1834, p. 276
- Catalogue des produits de l'industrie française admis à l'exposition publique sur la place de la Concorde en 1834, Paris: Pihan-Laforest, 1834, p. 147
- L'Industrie. Exposition de 1834, Paris: L. Tenre, p. 160
- François Humbert (1834), Notice sur les appareils et machines exposés dans la salle n° 1, section 24, inventés par M. Humbert père et employés dans l'établissement orthopédique fondé par lui à Morley dès l'année 1817, Bar-le-Duc: F. Gigault d'Olincourt, p. 32
- Stéphane Flachat (1834), L'industrie. : exposition de 1834 (Illustrated guide to the Exposition des produits de l'industrie française, 1834), illustrations by Auguste Louis François Ribault, Paris: L. Tenré, p. 239
- Charles Dupin (1836), Rapport du jury central sur les produits de l'industrie française exposés en 1834, Paris: Impr. royale, p. 510

== Sources ==
- Becchia, Alain (2000), La draperie d'Elbeuf, des origines à 1870 (in French), Publication Univ Rouen Havre, ISBN 978-2-87775-747-8
- Chandler, Arthur, Expositions of the July Monarchy
- Colmont, Achille de (1855), Histoire des Expositions des produits de l'Industrie Française (in French), Guillaumin
- Douyere-Demeulenaere, Christiane (2005), "Expositions publiques des produits de l'industrie française avant 1850" (PDF), archivesnationales.culture.gouv.fr (in French)
- Exposition publique des produits de l'industrie française (08; 1834; Paris) (in French), BnF: Bibliotheque nationale de France
- Kiernan, Michael T. (2016-02-11), The Engineers of Cornwall at the Mines of Pontgibaud in France, Lulu.com, ISBN 978-1-326-55341-8
- "L'industrie parisienne présentée à l'exposition de 1834", Histoires de Paris (in French), 31 December 2016
