= Quinze-Vingts National Ophthalmology Hospital =

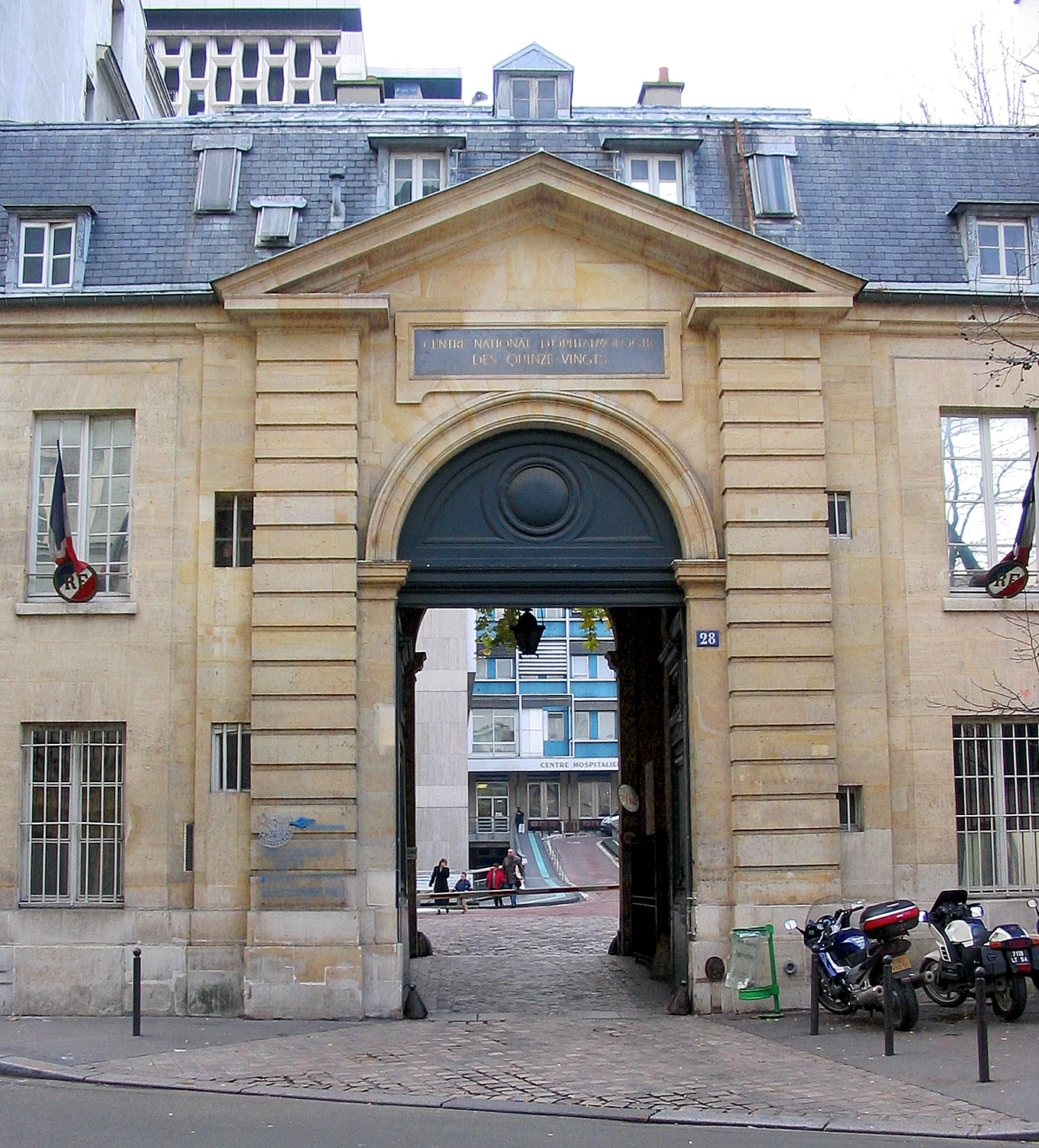

Geography
- Location: 28 rue de Charenton, 75012 Paris, France
- Coordinates: 48.8509186°N 2.3712167°E

Links
- Lists: Hospitals in France

The Quinze-Vingts National Ophthalmology Hospital (Centre hospitalier national d’ophtalmologie des Quinze-Vingts) is France's national ophthalmology hospital located in Paris, in the 12th arrondissement. The hospital gave its name to the Quinze-Vingts quarter.

== Source of the name ==
The name Quinze-Vingts, which means three hundred (15 × 20 = 300; trois cents in modern French), comes from the vigesimal (based on 20) numeral system used in the Middle Ages: it referred to the number of beds in the hospital, and was intended to house 300 poor, blind city-dwellers.

Saint Louis, in the 13th century, is said to have had this hospital built to provide aid to 300 knights taken prisoner by the Saracens during the Seventh Crusade, who were blinded before being freed. However, Jean de Joinville makes no mention of this, and no contemporary source confirms it. According to the historian of the Quinze-Vingts, Léon Le Grand, this is a legend that emerged in the 16th century.

== History ==
The Hospice des Quinze-Vingts, a hospital for the blind, was founded in 1260 by Louis IX, king of France, also known as "Saint Louis". It was built on a piece of land called "Champ-Pourri", an area lying a short distance west of the Louvre fortress, outside the fortified wall built by Philippe Augustus from 1190 to 1209. It was included within the city after the erection of the new fortified wall of Charles V built between 1356 and 1383. Within the new neighborhood thus formed west of the Louvre, the hospice was located on rue Saint-Honoré at the corner of the rue Saint-Nicaise, (in the area between the Palais-Royal and Place du Carrousel, whose construction post-dated by several centuries that of the Quinze-Vingts).

In 1779, during the reign of Louis XVI, the Cardinal de Rohan transferred the hospital to its current location, rue de Charenton, in the former barracks of the "Black Musketeers", (Mousquetaires noirs, named for the color of their horses), which had been disbanded in 1775. Rohan also changed the system of administration and increased the number of beds to eight hundred.

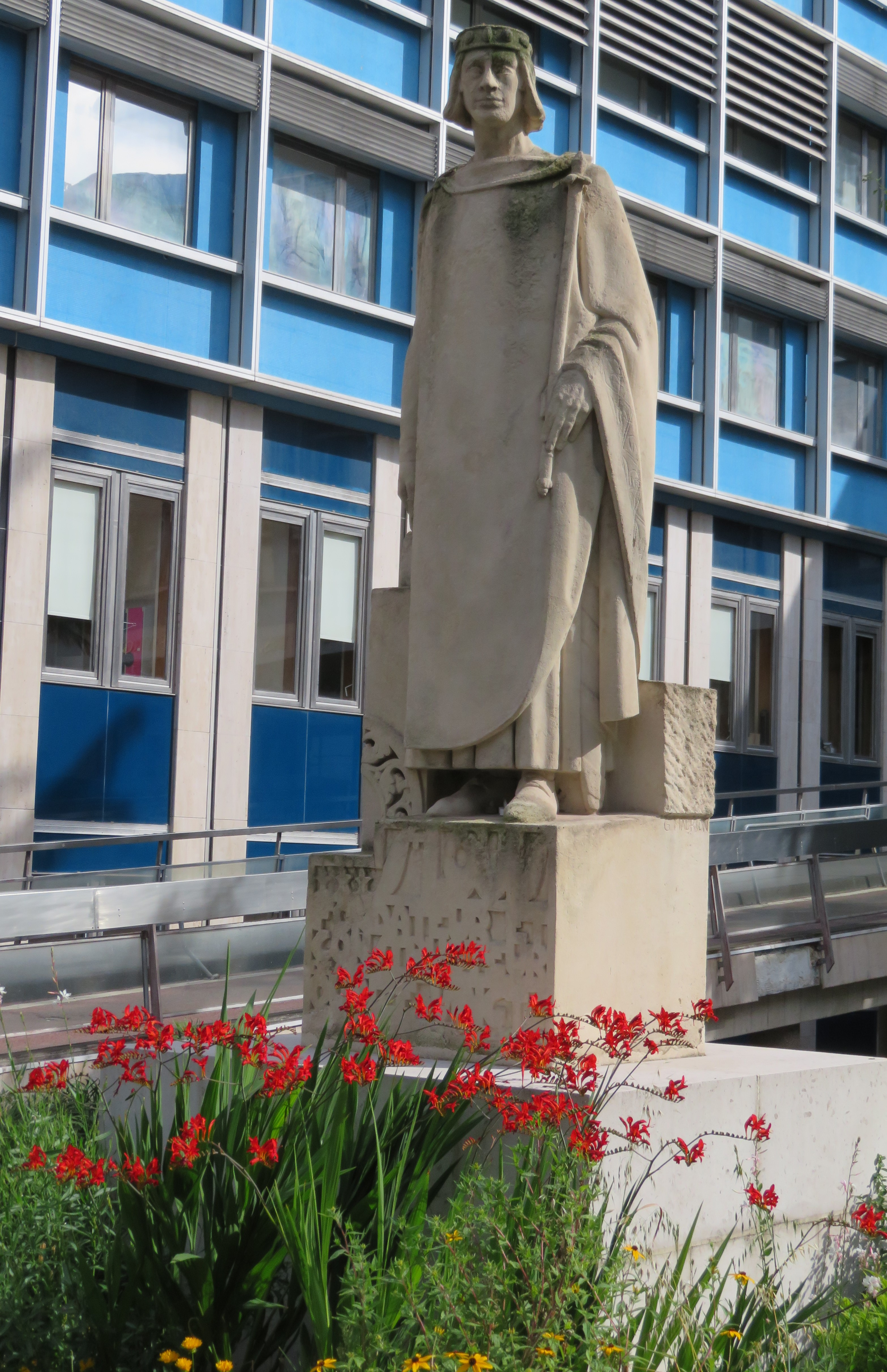
Statue of Louis IX in the courtyard of the hospital

In 1801, during the Consulate, the hospital housed the Institute for the Young Blind (today the Institut National des Jeunes Aveugles) founded by Valentin Haüy in 1784.

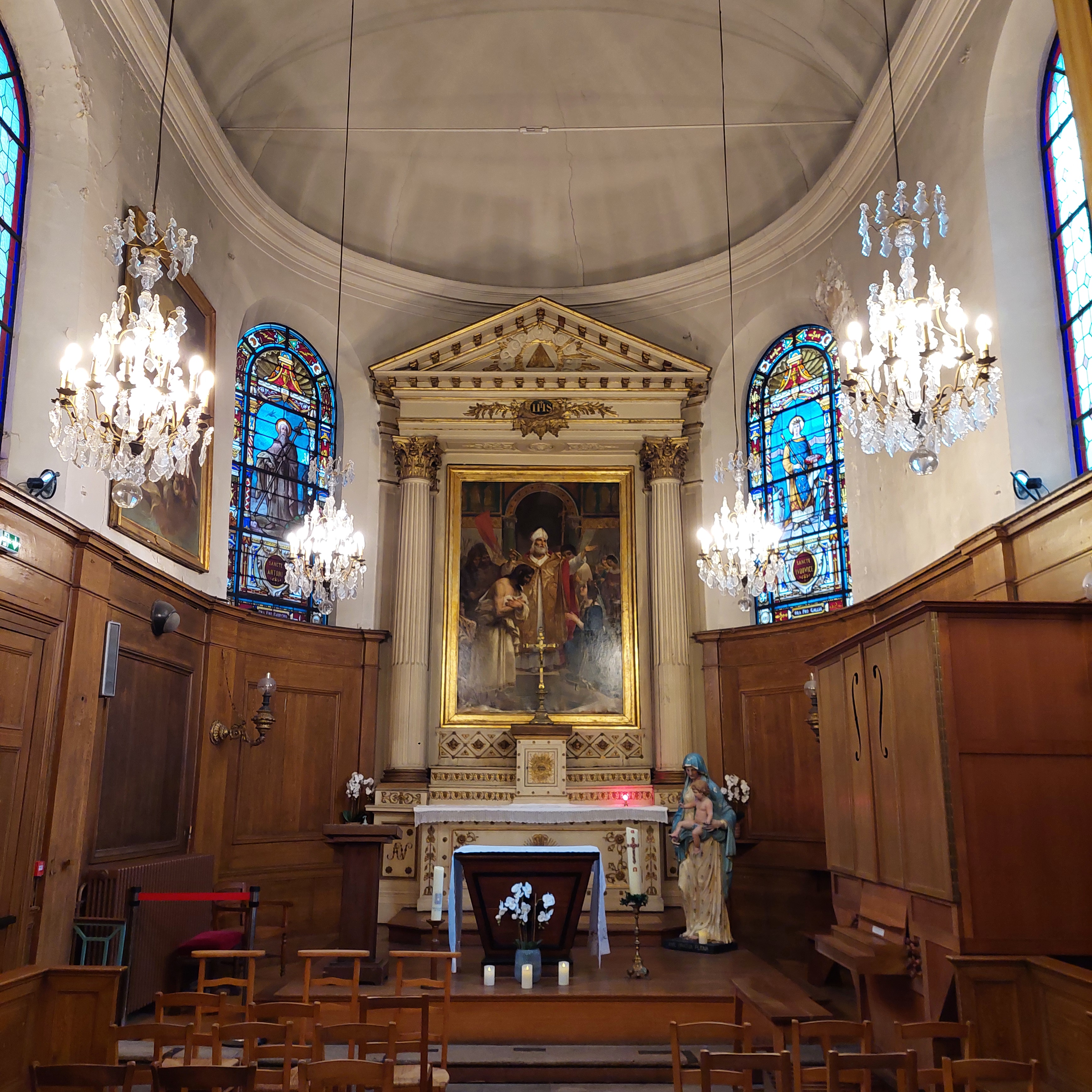
The chapel of the hospital

Between 1957 and 1968, large parts of the former barracks of Black Musketeers were demolished. What was left - entrance and chapel - was classified Monument historique (historical monument) on 26 December 1976.

To this day, the Quinze-Vingts remains a hospital for eye diseases. It also houses the Institut de la Vision (Eye Institute), an ophthalmology research center that opened in 2008.

The courtyard is decorated with a statue of king Saint Louis, created by French sculptor François-Léon Sicard and completed by his student, Gabrielle Maurion.

== Bibliography ==
Zina Weygand, The Blind in French Society from the Middle Ages to the Century of Louis Braille, Stanford University Press, 2009
