= Briant, Saône-et-Loire =

Briant
- Commune
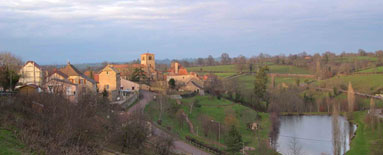
- Location of Briant
- Location within France Location within Bourgogne-Franche-Comté
- Coordinates: 46°18′03″N 4°08′58″E
- Country: France
- Region: Bourgogne-Franche-Comté
- Department: Saône-et-Loire
- Arrondissement: Charolles
- Canton: Chauffailles

Government
  - Mayor (2020–2026): Charles Vernay
- Area^{1}: 13.31 km^{2} (5.14 sq mi)
- Elevation: 400 m (1,300 ft)
- Highest elevation: 548 m (1,798 ft)
- Lowest elevation: 280 m (920 ft)
- Population (2023): 222
  - Density: 16.7/km^{2} (43.2/sq mi)
- Time zone: UTC+01:00 (CET)
  - Summer (DST): UTC+02:00 (CEST)
- INSEE/Postal code: 71060 /71110
- ^{1} French Land Register data, which excludes lakes, ponds, glaciers > 1 km^{2} (0.386 sq mi or 247 acres) and river estuaries.

Briant (French pronunciation: [bʁijɑ̃]) is a commune in the Saône-et-Loire department in the region of Bourgogne-Franche-Comté in eastern France.

== See also ==
- Communes of the Saône-et-Loire department
