= Aniruddha's Bank for the Blind =

Blindness organization based in India

Aniruddha's Bank for the Blind (ABB) is an organization dedicated to the service of the visually challenged. Functioning like a 'bank', it stores knowledge in the form of audio CDs that record the academic syllabus of educational and technical institutions and makes these CD's available free of cost to visually challenged students.

== History ==
It is a joint activity/project of the `Shree Aniruddha Upasana Foundation’, ‘Aniruddha Samarpan Pathak’ and ‘Shree Aniruddha Aadesh Pathak’, committed towards offering service to the visually challenged. These entity are non-profit Organizations incorporated in Mumbai, India. This project was initiated in July 2004 under the guidance of Dr. Aniruddha Dhairyadhar Joshi, a successful consulting Rheumatologist, M.D., the Project began work in Mumbai, Maharashtra, India and then over the last 8 years, has spread its service network to 19 Indian states providing recorded audio material in 11 Indian languages. It has even been extending its hand of support to beneficiaries in Pakistan,(Springfield School Karachi). It initially began with cassettes and over a period of time, has switched to CDs keeping in mind the durability, the better sound quality and their compactness that enables easy storage.

== Organization and Work Structure ==
The team is made of a core active committee and a pool of volunteers (Sevabhavi Karyakartas) who hail from various regions of India. Well-versed in the Indian languages, these volunteers record the required material which is edited meticulously to maintain the quality matter & the sound and organized in such a way that the visually challenged may easily locate the desired page if need be. The recording assignments accepted on receiving written requests from the concerned educational institutions.e.g. Samagra Jeevan Vikas Samsthe, Karnataka The recording of the book is performed only after due clearance from publishing house of that respective book. The CDs are then packed and dispatched to beneficiaries.

== States Covered ==
West Zone : Goa, Gujarat, Maharashtra, Rajasthan

East Zone : West Bengal

North Zone : Chandigarh, Delhi, Haryana, Uttar Pradesh, Punjab

South Zone : Andhra Pradesh, Karnataka, Kerala, Pondicherry, Tamil Nadu

Central Zone : Bihar, Chhattisgarh, Jharkhand, Madhya Pradesh

== Languages Covered ==
Material for students covered in Marathi, Gujarati, English, Sanskrit, Hindi, Malayalam, Tamil, Kannada, Telugu, Bengali, Punjabi languages.

== Beneficiaries ==
Cds are provided to

1. Students of schools
2. Colleges
3. Universities (post graduate)
4. Vocational courses
5. Banking
6. Public service examination etc.

== Overall statistics ==
To date, 11,063 CDs & 30, 721 cassettes have reached 513 beneficiaries (128 individuals & 385 institutions)
