= Valentin Haüy =

Founder of the first school for the blind

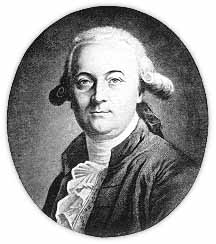
- Valentin Haüy
- Born: 13 November 1745; Saint-Just-en-Chaussée, Oise, France
- Died: 18 March 1822 (aged 76); Paris, France
- Known for: founder of Institut National des Jeunes Aveugles, the first school for the blind
- Relatives: René Just Haüy

Valentin Haüy (pronounced [aɥi]; 13 November 1745 – 18 March 1822) was the founder, in 1785, of the first school for the blind, the Institute for Blind Youth in Paris (now Institut National des Jeunes Aveugles, or the National Institute for the Young Blind, INJA). In 1819, Louis Braille entered this school.

== Life ==
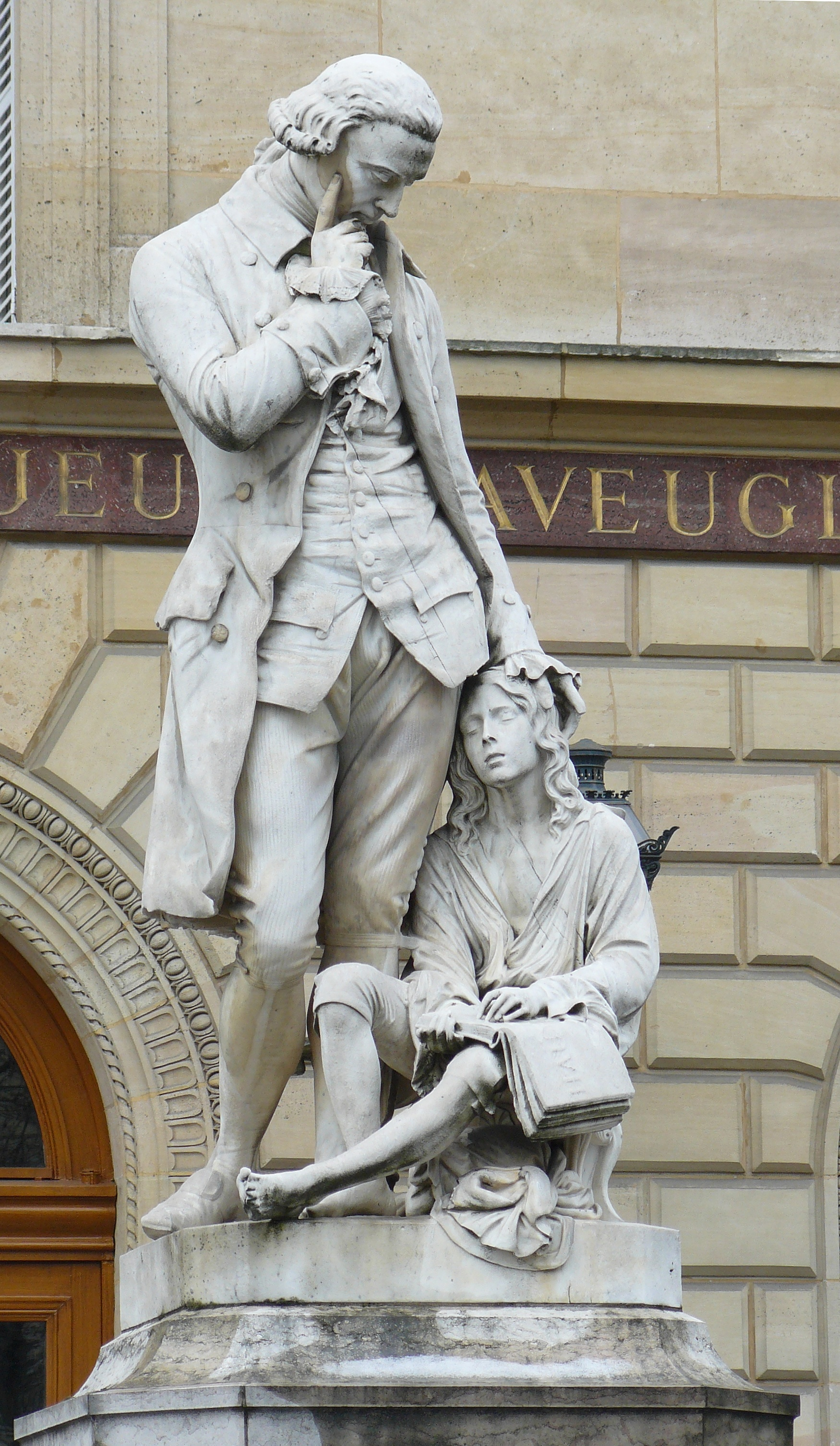
Statue at the Institut national des jeunes aveugles

Haüy was born into a family of weavers. His father, a full-time loomer, also held the job of ringing the Angelus bells in a local Premonstrant Abbey. The abbey monks educated Valentin and he became a skilled linguist speaking ten different languages of the day. He also studied Ancient Greek and Hebrew. In 1783, he gained the title "interpreter to the king", Louis XVI. In 1786, he was the interpreter of the King, to the Admiralty and the City Hall. He was a member of the Office of Writing.

Haüy's impulse to help the blind started in 1771, after he stopped for lunch in a cafe on the Place de la Concorde, Paris. There, he witnessed an ensemble of people from the Quinze-Vingts hospice for the blind being mocked during the religious street festival, "Saint Ovid's Fair". They were given dunce caps, oversized cardboard glasses and told to play their instruments which resulted in a cacophony of noises. He decided to found a school with Charles-Michel de l'Épée.

In May 1784, at Saint-Germain-des-Prés, he met a young beggar, François Lesueur, who became his first student. He developed a method of raised letters, to teach Lesueur to read, and compose sentences. He made rapid progress, and Haüy announced the success, in September 1784 in the Journal de Paris, then receiving encouragement from the French Academy of Sciences.

With the help of the Philanthropic Society Haüy founded the Institute for Blind Youth (Institution des jeunes aveugles), in February 1785. Building on the philanthropic spinning workshop for the blind, it received the support of Louis XVI and became the Royal institution of Blind Children on 26 December 1786. Its purpose was to educate students and teach them manual work: spinning, and letterpress. During the French Revolution, it was taken over by the state on 28 September 1791. It became the National Institute of blind workers in a Celestine monastery.

Valentin Haüy was active in the political life of his time, and was secretary of the National Constituent Assembly elections of 1792, then civil commissioner. He was arrested on 5 Prairial III (24 May 1795), and he was released on 11 by the Committee of Public Safety, arrested again on 20 by the National Convention. He was released on 19 Fructidor, he joined the Panthéon Club, under the French Directory. Under the French Consulate, he was listed as a "terrorist". In 1802, he was retired from management of Blind Asylum, and granted a pension. In February, 1802, he started a private school in the rue Sainte-Avoye. In September 1806, he moved to St. Petersburg, to found a school at the request of Alexander I of Russia.

He returned to Paris, in 1817, to live with his brother, René Just Haüy, who is considered a founder of modern mineralogy.

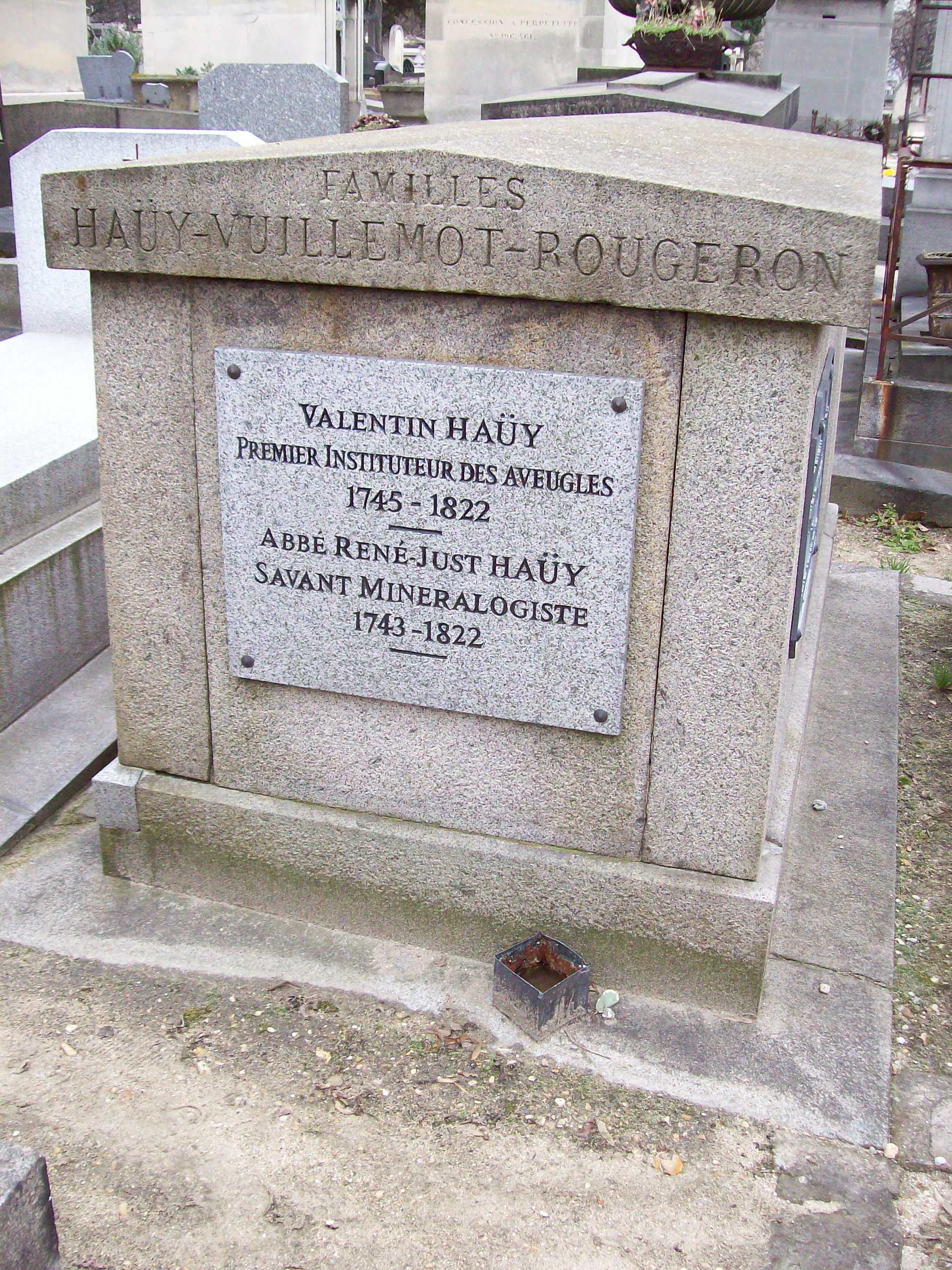
Grave of Valentin Haüy and René Just Haüy

He is buried, with his brother René, in Père Lachaise Cemetery in Paris.

== Legacy ==
In 1889, Maurice de La Sizeranne created an association dedicated to helping the blind and visually impaired, named for him.

== See also ==
- Louis Braille
- Musée Valentin Haüy
- Slate and stylus, History
- fr :Association Valentin Haüy
- Maria Theresia von Paradis
- Musée Valentin Haüy
