= IJ (digraph) =

Latin-script digraph

IJ digraph

IJ (minuscule: ij; Dutch pronunciation: [ɛi]), also encountered as Unicode compatibility characters Ĳ and ĳ, is a digraph of the letters i and j. Occurring in the Dutch language, it is sometimes considered a ligature, or a letter in itself. In most fonts that have a separate character for ij, the two composing parts are not connected but are separate glyphs, which are sometimes slightly kerned.

An ij in written Dutch usually represents the diphthong [ɛi], similar to the pronunciation of ⟨ay⟩ in "pay", and is preserved in such Dutch spellings as the place-name IJsselmeer. In standard Dutch and most Dutch dialects, there are two possible spellings for the diphthong [ɛi]: ij and ei, with no clear usage rules. To distinguish between the two, the ij is referred to as the lange ij ("long ij"), the ei as korte ei ("short ei") or simply E – I. In certain Dutch dialects (notably West Flemish and Zeelandic) and the Dutch Low Saxon dialects of Low German, a difference in the pronunciation of ei and ij is maintained. Whether it is pronounced identically to ei or not, the pronunciation of ij is often perceived as difficult by people who do not have either sound in their native language.

The ij originally represented a 'long i'. It used to be written as ii, as it is in Finnish, Estonian, and notably in West Frisian (where cognates like iis/ijs "ice" can often be found). For orthographic purposes, the second i was eventually elongated to j (considered a stylistic variant of i rather than a distinct letter at the time), which is a reason why it is called lange ij. This can still be seen in the pronunciation of some words like bijzonder /bi.zɔn.dər/, and the etymology of some words in the Dutch form of several foreign placenames: Berlin and Paris are spelled Berlijn and Parijs. Nowadays, the pronunciation mostly follows the spelling, and they are pronounced with [ɛi]. The ij is distinct from the letter y. Particularly when writing capitals, Y used to be common instead of IJ in the past. That practice has long been deprecated, since 1804. In scientific disciplines such as mathematics and physics, the symbol y is usually pronounced ij in Dutch.

To distinguish the Y from IJ in common speech, however, Y is often called Griekse ij (meaning "Greek Y"), a literal translation of i-grec (from French, with the stress on grec: [iˈɡrɛk]) or alternatively called Ypsilon. In modern Dutch, the letter Y occurs only in loanwords, proper nouns, or when deliberately spelled as Early Modern Dutch. The spelling of Afrikaans (a daughter language of early modern Dutch) has evolved in the exact opposite direction and IJ was completely replaced by Y in 1921 in the third edition of Afrikaanse Woordelys en Spelreëls.

Archaic use of Y in Dutch survives in some personal names. For example, the surname Spijker was often changed into Spyker and Snijder into Snyder.

IJ was also used in the Latin Assyrian alphabet, which was used between 1930 and 1938 during the U.S.S.R.'s Latinisation campaign. It represented the close front unrounded vowel (i).

The words ijsvrij and yoghurt in various forms. Depending on the form of handwriting or font used, the IJ and Y can look either nearly identical or very different.

Apt to confusion: (1) i + j, (2) ligature ij, (3) y with diaeresis, (4) y; all in Garamond typeface

Logo of the Rijksmuseum in Amsterdam.

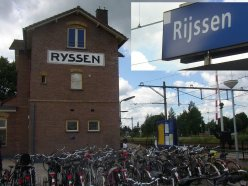
Two signs of Rijssen railway station, each using a different format

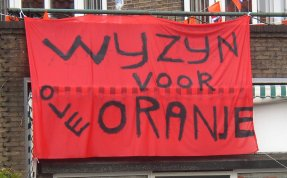
IJ here is written as one letter.

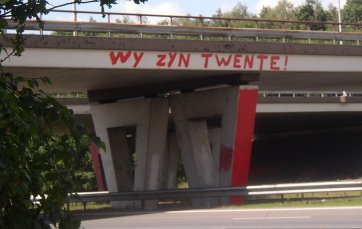
Here, IJ is written as Y.

== History ==
IJ probably developed out of ii, representing a long [iː] sound (which it still does in some cases, such as in the word bijzonder and in several Dutch dialects). In the Middle Ages, the i was written without a dot in handwriting, and the combination ıı was often confused with u. Therefore, the second i was elongated: ıȷ. Later, the dots were added, albeit not in Afrikaans, a language that has its roots in Dutch. In this language y is used instead.

Alternatively, the letter J may have developed as a swash form of i. In other European languages it was first used for the final i in Roman numerals when there was more than one i in a row, such as iij for "three", to prevent the fraudulent addition of an extra i to change the number. In Dutch, which had a native ii, the "final i in a row elongated" rule was applied as well, leading to ij.

Another theory is that IJ might have arisen from the lowercase y being split into two strokes in handwriting. At some time in the 15th or 16th century, this combination began to be spelled as a ligature ij. An argument against this theory is that even in handwriting which does not join letters, ij is often written as a single character.

Some time after the birth of this new letter, the sound which was now represented by ij, in most cases, began to be pronounced much like ei instead, but words containing it were still spelled the same. Nowadays, ij in most cases represents the diphthong [ɛi], except in the suffix -lijk, where it is usually pronounced as a schwa. In one special case, the Dutch word bijzonder, the (old) sound [iː] is correct standard pronunciation, although [i] is more common and [ɛi] is also allowed.

In proper names, ij often appears instead of i at the end of other diphthongs, where it does not affect the pronunciation: aaij, eij, oeij, ooij and uij are pronounced identically to aai [aːi], ei [ɛi], oei [ui], ooi [oːi] and ui [œy]. This derives from an old orthographic practice (also seen in older French and German) of writing y instead of i after another vowel; later, when y and ij came to be seen as interchangeable, the spellings with ij came to be used. Spelling reforms and standardization have removed the redundant js in common words, but proper names continue to use these archaic spellings.

== Status ==
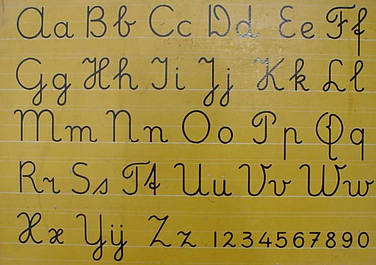
A poster showing the letters of the alphabet used for writing education in the Netherlands. The final three letter pairs read "Xx IJij Zz".

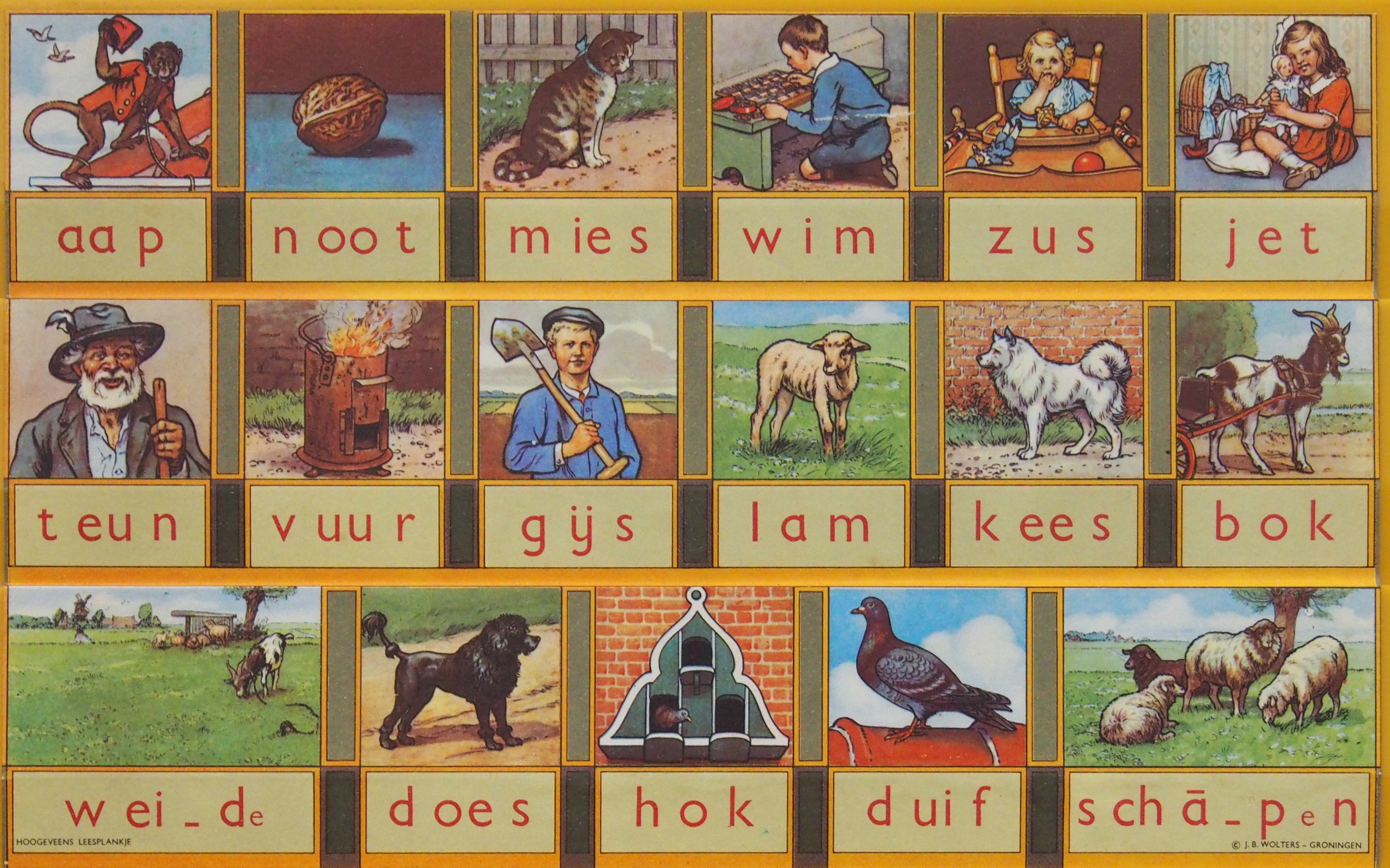
In this version the ij is a single glyph.

As the rules of usage for the IJ differ from those that apply to the many other digraphs in the Dutch language—in some situations behaving more as a single ligature or letter than a digraph—the IJ is not only confusing to foreigners, but also a source of discussion among native speakers of Dutch. Its actual usage in the Netherlands and in Flanders (Belgium) sometimes differs from the official recommendations.

=== Official status ===
Both the Dutch Language Union and the Genootschap Onze Taal consider the ij to be a digraph of the letters i and j. The descriptive dictionary Van Dale Groot woordenboek van de Nederlandse taal states that ij is a "letter combination consisting of the signs i and j, used, in some words, to represent the diphthong ɛi." The Winkler Prins encyclopedia states that ij is the 25th letter of the Dutch alphabet, placed between X and Y. However, this definition is not generally accepted.

In words where i and j are in different syllables, they do not form the digraph ij. In compound words, a hyphen is added, as in gummi-jas.

=== Netherlands ===
In the Netherlands, IJ is often used as a ligature:

- In Dutch primary schools, ij used to be taught as being the 25th letter of the alphabet, and some primary school writing materials still list it as such. However, ij is according to Onze Taal not part of the Dutch alphabet and is usually sorted under the i as it is considered to consist of two letters.
- When a word starting with IJ is capitalised, the entire digraph is capitalised: IJsselmeer, IJmuiden.
- On mechanical Dutch typewriters, there is a key that produces 'ij' (in a single letterspace, located directly to the right of the L). However, this is not the case on modern computer keyboards.
- In many word puzzles, such as Lingo, ij fills one square, but in others, such as Scrabble, ij fills two squares.

=== Flanders ===
In Flanders (Belgium), IJ is generally described in schools as a combination of two separate characters.

- As in the Netherlands, words that begin with IJ (and that are the first word in a sentence) usually capitalise the entire pair: IJzer, IJzertoren.

== Usage ==
=== Capitalisation ===
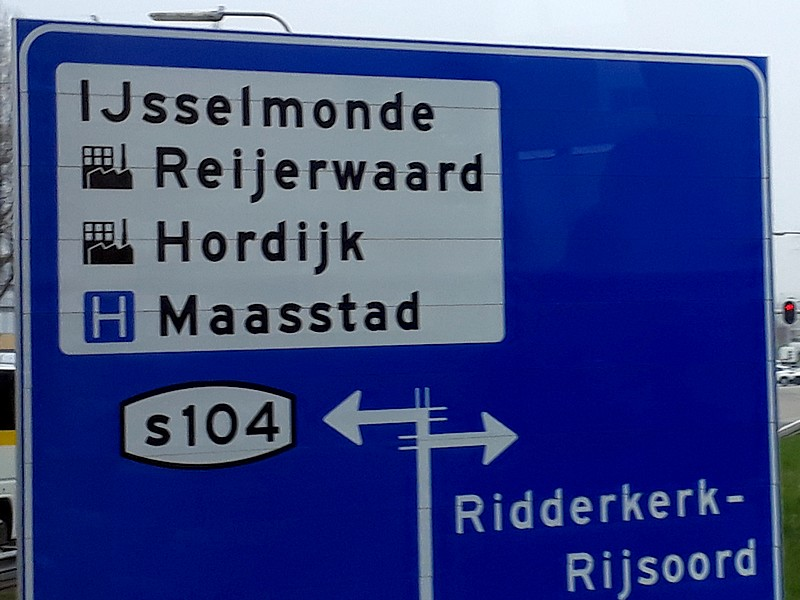
Road sign in Rotterdam area with capitalised digraph IJ in proper name IJsselmonde

When a Dutch word starting with IJ is capitalised, the entire digraph is capitalised, as in IJsselmeer or IJmuiden.

Support for this property in software is limited. Poorly localised text editors with autocorrect functionality may incorrectly convert the second of two initial capital letters in a word to lowercase; such improper spelling can thus be found in informal writing. Support on the internet is similarly inconsistent: Web pages styled with the CSS property text-transform: capitalize are specified to be handled with Unicode language-specific case mapping rules (content language being indicated with HTML language attributes, such as lang="nl" for Dutch), but support for language-specific cases is limited to Mozilla Firefox (version 14 and above) as of January 2021.

=== Collation ===
Dutch dictionaries since about 1850 invariably sort ij as an i followed by a j, i.e. between ih and ik. This is the preferred sorting by the Taalunie. On the other hand, some encyclopedias, like the Winkler Prins, 7th edition, sort ij as a single letter positioned between x and y.

Telephone directories as well as the Yellow Pages in the Netherlands (but not those in Belgium) sort ij and y together, as if they were the same, between x and z. Thanks to this, surnames like Bruijn and Bruyn which sound the same (and even look similar), can be found in the same area. However, Bruin, though it sounds the same as well, is placed with "Brui-" and not with "Bruy-".

=== Abbreviations ===
When words or (first) names are shortened to their initials, in the Netherlands a word or proper name starting with IJ is abbreviated to IJ. For example, IJsbrand Eises Ypma is shortened to IJ. E. Ypma. The digraph "ei" in "Eises", like other digraphs in Dutch, is shortened to just E.

=== Stress ===
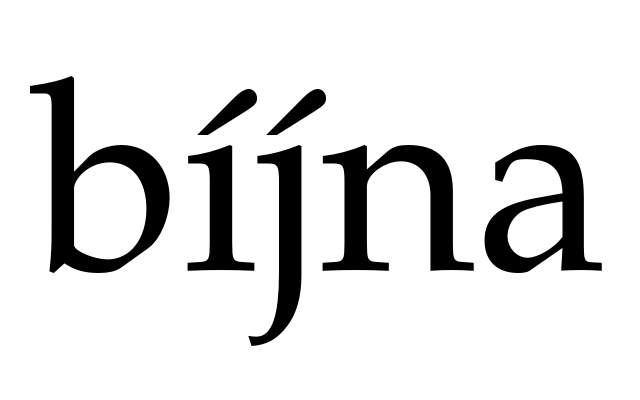
The Dutch word bijna (almost, nearly) with ad hoc stress on the first syllable indicated by two acute accents on the digraph ij

In Dutch orthography, ad hoc indication of stress can be marked by placing an acute accent on the vowel of the stressed syllable. In case of a diphthong or double vowel, both vowels should be marked with an acute accent; this also applies to the IJ (even though J by itself is not a vowel, the digraph IJ represents one distinct vowel sound). However, due to technical limitations the accent on the j is often omitted in electronic documents: "bíjna". Nevertheless, in Unicode it is possible to combine characters into a j with an acute accent — "bíj́na" — though this might not be supported or rendered correctly by some fonts or systems. This j́ is the combination of the regular (soft-dotted) j (U+006A) and the combining acute accent ́ (U+0301). In fonts where the j́ combination is not supported, the tittle on the j may be accompanied by the acute, resulting in ȷ̇́ or similar. This may be avoided by using the dotless ȷ (U+0237) with acute ́ (U+0301), resulting in ȷ́.

=== Spelling ===
Vrijdag can be spelled out in two ways, depending on whether the speller considers ij to be one letter or not:

- V – R – IJ – D – A – G
- V – R – I – J – D – A – G

=== Wide inter-letter spacing ===
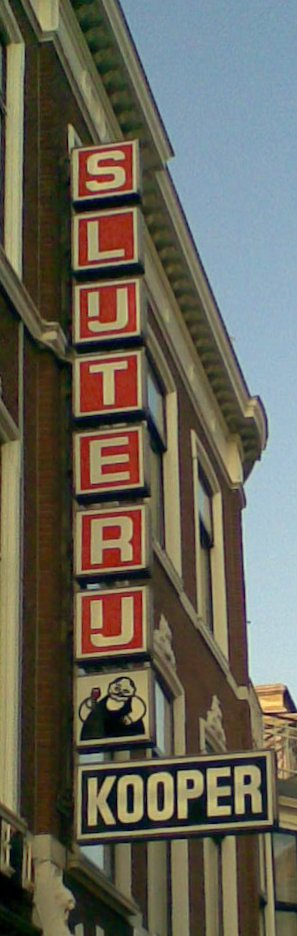
On this signboard of a liquor store (slijterij), IJ occupies the same space as single letters. The I is put over the lower end of the J to reinforce their unity, but this is optional and I and J can also be found separately on other signs

When words are written with large inter-letter spacing, IJ is often, but not always, kept together. F r a n k r ij k or F r a n k r i j k.

When words are written from top to bottom with non-rotated letters IJ, while not mandatory, keeping them together is largely preferred.

F
r
a
n
k
r
ij
k

or

F
r
a
n
k
r
i
j
k

=== Spelling of proper names ===
In Dutch names, interchangeability of i, ij and y is frequent. Some names are changed unofficially for commercial reasons or by indifference:

- Johan Cruijff/Cruyff, former football player and manager
- Ruud van Nistelrooij/Nistelrooy, football player
- Piet Heijn/Heyn/Hein, a Dutch West India Company admiral
- Dirk Kuijt/Kuyt, football player
- Arie Luijendijk/Luyendyk, race-driver
- Spijker/Spyker, car manufacturer
- Anner Bijlsma/Bylsma, cellist

The Dutch football team of Feyenoord changed its name from the original "Feijenoord" to "Feyenoord" after achieving international successes. This was done as a reaction to foreign people often mispronouncing the name. The Feijenoord district in Rotterdam, the namesake of the football club maintains its original spelling.

=== Phonetic radio alphabet ===
In the Dutch phonetic radio alphabet, the codeword IJmuiden represents the IJ. This is clearly different from the codeword Ypsilon, which is used to represent the Y. Dutch and Belgian armed forces use the official NATO phonetic alphabet, where "Y" is "Yankee" and "IJ" is spelled out "India Juliett".

=== Word games ===
In crossword puzzles (except for Scrabble – see next paragraph), and in the game Lingo, IJ is considered one letter, filling one square, but the IJ and the Y are considered distinct. In other word games, the rules may vary.

The Dutch version of Scrabble has a Y with a face value of eight. Some players used it to represent IJ or Y. The recent Dutch version comes with an example game, which clearly indicates that Y is only Y, and IJ should be composed of I and J. In previous editions of Scrabble there was a single IJ sign.

In word games that make a distinction between vowels and consonants, IJ is considered to be a vowel, if it is considered one letter. Whether Y is a vowel or a consonant, is another matter of discussion, since Y can represent both a vowel or a (half-) consonant.

== Technical details ==
=== Print and handwriting ===
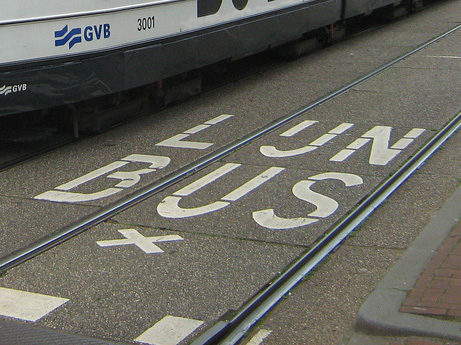
Lijnbus (road section reserved for public bus line, literally "line bus") showing IJ as a "broken U" glyph

In print, the letter ÿ (lowercase y with diaeresis) and ij look very different, but handwriting usually makes ÿ, ij and Y, IJ look identical. However, since y occurs only in loanwords, the letter ÿ is extremely rare (if not altogether nonexistent) in Dutch.

The long ij extends below the baseline and so is written with a long stroke. It is often written as a single sign, even in handwriting that does not join letters.

On some road signs in the Netherlands, IJ appears as a single glyph formed like a U with a break in the left-hand stroke.

Uppercase IJ glyph with the distinctive "broken U" ligature in a Helvetica font for Omega TeX

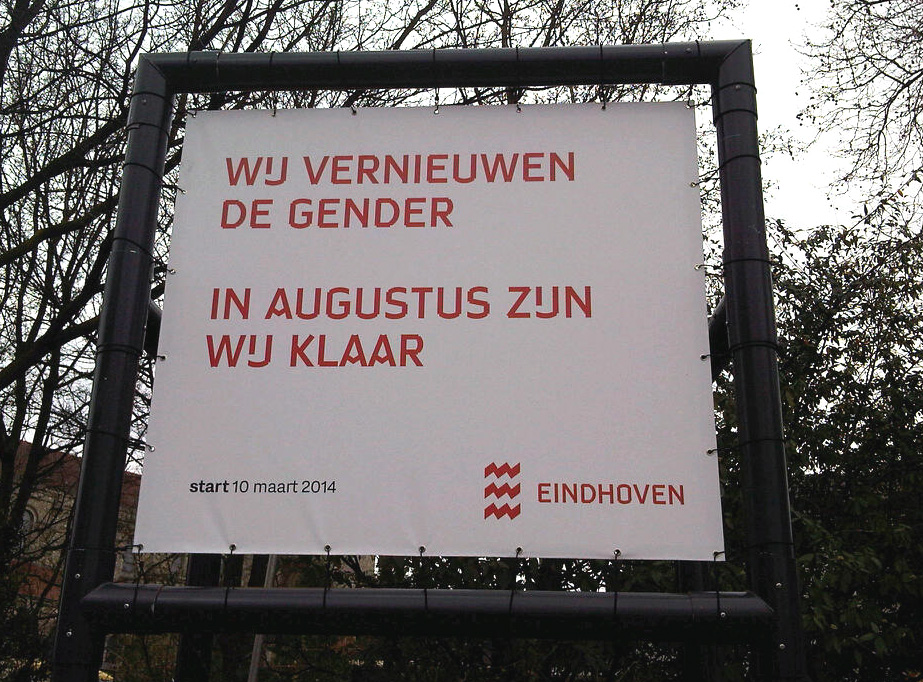
IJ as a "broken U" glyph

=== Braille ===
Dutch six-dot Braille, which is used in the Netherlands, has ⟨ij⟩ represented by ⠽, which represents ⟨y⟩ in other varieties of Braille. ⟨y⟩ is written as ⠠⠽.

In Belgium, French Braille is used, in which ⟨ij⟩ is written simply as ⟨i⟩ + ⟨j⟩: ⠊⠚.

=== Encoding ===
The Dutch ij is not present in the ASCII code, nor in any of the ISO 8859 character encodings. Therefore, the digraph is most often encoded as an i followed by a j. The ligature is present as a national-use character within the Dutch version of ISO 646, one implementation of which is of DEC's National Replacement Character Set (NRCS) aka code page 1102, and it also existed in the Atari ST character set (but not in the GEM character set for PCs) as well as in the Lotus Multi-Byte Character Set (LMBCS). It is also present in Unicode in the Latin Extended-A range as U+0132 Ĳ LATIN CAPITAL LIGATURE IJ (&IJlig;) and U+0133 ĳ LATIN SMALL LIGATURE IJ (&ijlig;). These characters are considered compatibility-decomposable. They are included for compatibility and round-trip convertibility with legacy encodings, but their use is discouraged. Therefore, even with Unicode available, it is recommended to encode ij as two separate letters. Nonetheless, some fonts use this code point for the ligated form of IJ if it exists.

=== Keyboards ===
While Dutch typewriters usually have a separate key for lowercase ij, Belgian typewriters do not. In the Netherlands, a QWERTY computer keyboard layout is common. The standard US layout (often in "International Mode") is widely used, although a specific but rarely used Dutch variant (KBD143) does exist. In Belgium, a specific Belgian variant of AZERTY keyboard layout (KBD120) is widely used. None of these keyboards feature a key for ij or IJ.

== Not as a digraph ==
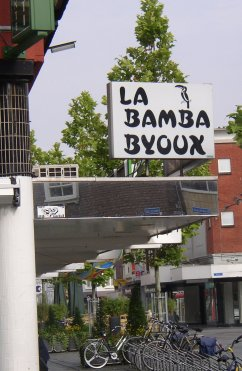
This Dutch shopkeeper wrote 'byoux' instead of 'bijoux'.

If the i and the j belong to different syllables, such as in the mathematical term bijectie (syllablised "bi‧jec‧tie"), words with old spelling minijurk (syllablised "mi‧ni‧jurk"), skijas (syllablised "ski‧jas"), foreign placenames like Beijing, Dijon, Fiji or person names like Khadija, Elijah, Marija, they do not form a ligature or a single letter. Earlier statements about sorting ij on par with y, keeping ij together in the kerning of printed texts, the single square in crossword puzzles, etc., do not apply.
