= Language reform =

Intentional programs to alter language

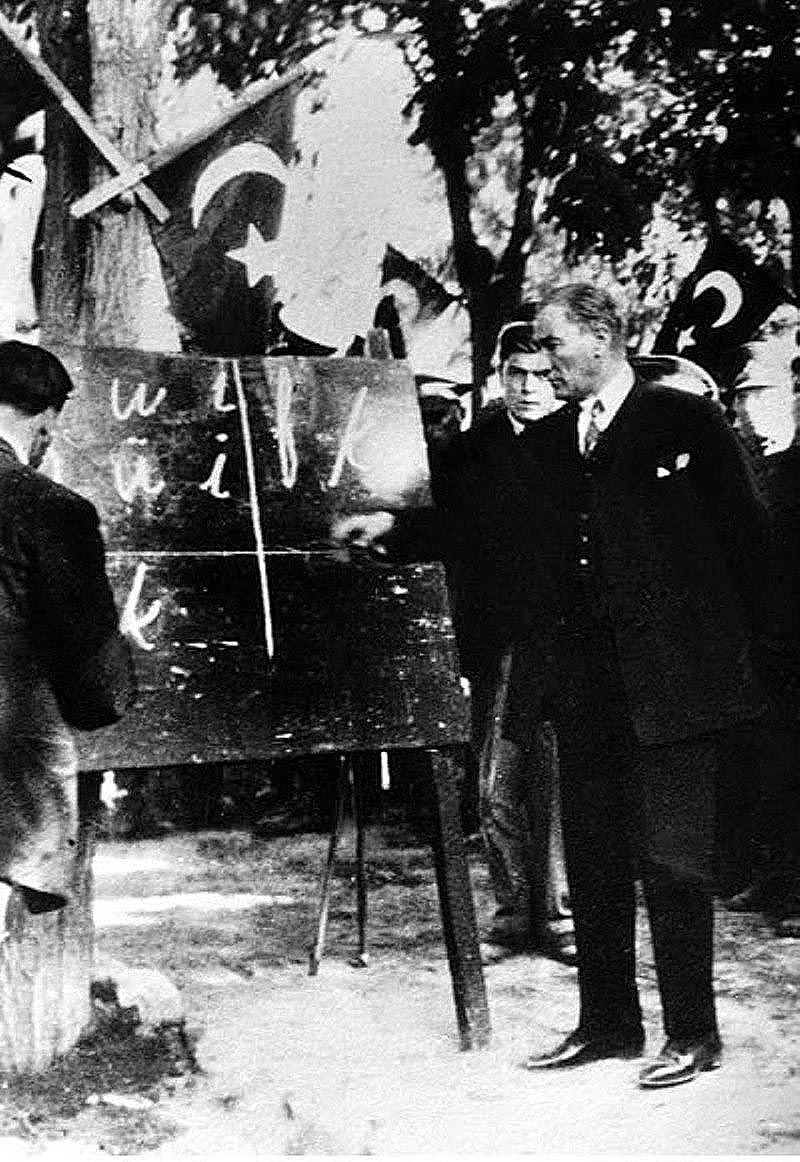
Mustafa Kemal Atatürk introducing the new Turkish alphabet on 20 September 1928

Language reform is a kind of language planning by widespread change to a language. The typical methods of language reform are simplification and linguistic purism. Simplification regularises vocabulary, grammar, or spelling. Purism aligns the language with a form which is deemed 'purer'.

Language reforms are intentional changes to language; this article does not cover natural language change, such as the Great Vowel Shift.

== Simplification ==
By far the most common language reform is simplification. The most common simplification is spelling reform, but inflection, syntax, vocabulary and word formation can also be targets for simplification. For example, in English, there are many prefixes which mean "the opposite of", e.g. un-, in-, a(n)-, dis-, and de-. A language reform might propose to replace the redundant prefixes with one, such as un-.

== Purification ==
Linguistic purism or linguistic protectionism is the prescriptive practice of recognising one form of a language as purer or of intrinsically higher quality than others. The perceived or actual decline may take the form of change of vocabulary, syncretism of grammatical elements, or loanwords, and in this case, the form of a language reform.

== Examples ==
Examples of language reforms are:

- Belgian Dutch (Dutch) – In 1844 (Jan Frans Willems), 1864 (Matthias de Vries and L.A. te Winkel), 1946 (Marchant), 1996 (Actie) and 2006.
- Catalan – In 1917 Pompeu Fabra published Diccionari ortogràfic, the first Catalan dictionary. The complete Diccionari General de la Llengua Catalana was published in 1931.
- Chinese.
  - (1920s) – replaced Classical Chinese with Vernacular Chinese as the standard written language, largely through the efforts of Hu Shih.
  - (1950s PRC) – changed the script used to write the standard language by introducing Simplified Chinese characters (later adopted by Singapore and Malaysia, but Traditional Chinese characters remain in use in Taiwan, Hong Kong, Macau, and various overseas Chinese communities).
- Czech (19th century) – The dictionary of Josef Jungmann contributed to the renewal of the vocabulary. In the 1840s the letter w was replaced by v.
- Deseret Alphabet (1854-)- Early LDS Church effort to restore all language to the pure Adamic language used until the Tower of Babel.
- Dutch (19th and 20th century) — In 1883 (De Vries and Te Winkel), 1934 (Marchant), 1947 (The Green Booklet), 1996 (Actie) and 2006.
- Estonian (1910s/1920s) – reform movement led by Johannes Aavik and Johannes V. Veski renewed the vocabulary, borrowing a lot of roots from Finnish and other Uralic languages and even inventing some roots.
- French (18th, 19th, and 20th century) — In 1740, 1762, 1835, 1992 by the Académie française.
- German (1901/02) – unified the spelling system nationwide (first in Germany, with later adoption by other German-speaking lands). Further reforms were enacted more recently, in the German spelling reform of 1996.
- Greek (1970s/1980s) – while the written "pure" language, the Katharevousa was full of Ancient Greek words, the spoken "popular" language, the Demotic Greek was not. After the fall of the military rule, a law was promulgated, making the latter the written language as well. For example, on Greek coins, the plural of the currency was drachmai (Katharevousa) before and became drachmes (Demotic Greek) after 1982.
- Hebrew (1920s) – Modern Hebrew was created from Ancient Hebrew by grammatical simplification (especially of the syntax) according to Indo-European models, coinage of new words from Hebrew roots based on European models, and simplification of pronunciation rules. Linguist Ghil'ad Zuckermann argues that Modern Hebrew, which he calls "Israeli", is a Semito-European hybrid, based not only on Hebrew but also on Yiddish and other languages spoken by revivalists. Zuckermann therefore endorses the translation of the Hebrew Bible into what he calls "Israeli".
- Hungarian (late 18th and early 19th centuries) – more than ten thousand words were coined, thousands of which are actively used today (see also Ferenc Kazinczy).
- Irish (1940s) – spelling system greatly simplified: Gaedheal became Gael, and Ó Séigheadh became Ó Sé.
- Japanese (1946) – historical kana usage was replaced by modern kana usage, while the kanji system also transformed from Traditional Chinese characters to New Characters.
- Norwegian (20th century) – as Norway became independent from Denmark (1814), Norwegians wanted a written language closer to spoken Norwegian. The reforms in 1907 and 1917 made Riksmål the written standard Norwegian, renamed Bokmål in 1929. Bokmål and the more vernacular Nynorsk were made closer by a reform in 1938. Today both language forms are written: on Norwegian coins, the name of the country is alternately Norge (Bokmål) and Noreg (Nynorsk).
- Portuguese (20th century) – replaced a cumbersome traditional spelling system with a simplified one (asthma, for instance, became asma and phthysica became tísica).
- Romanian (19th century) – replaced Cyrillic script with the Latin alphabet, deprecated thousands of Slavic words in favour of Romance words. Romanian has undergone spelling reforms in 1904, 1953, and, most recently, in 1993, with two minor ones in 1964 and 2005.
- Russian – 1918 – Major changes in Russian orthography. Several letters were removed from Russian alphabet. Minor changes in Russian grammar. The reform has simplified some aspects of the language. Other reforms happened in 1708/1710 and 1956.
- Serbian (19th century) — Slavonic-Serbian, the literary language of Habsburg Serbs, was disused with Vuk Karadžić's reforms and standardisation as official language of Serbia.
- Somali (1970s) – modified Latin script developed by a number of leading scholars of Somali, including Musa Haji Ismail Galal, B. W. Andrzejewski and Shire Jama Ahmed for writing the Somali language; made compulsory in 1972 by the President of Somalia, General Mohamed Siad Barre
- Turkish (1930s) – language and writing system were reformed beginning in the 1920s, such that the older language is called by a different name: Ottoman Turkish. The Ottoman alphabet was based on the Arabic alphabet, which was replaced in 1928 by the new Latin-based Turkish alphabet. Loanwords of Persian and Arabic origin were dropped in favour of native Turkish words or new coinages based on Turkic roots.
- Vietnamese (20th century) – Classical Chinese lost official status in 1918, and the colonial schools instituted a "Franco-Vietnamese Curriculum" at this time. Vietnamese was taught using the Latin alphabet, and this form soon became dominant.

== Instances in popular culture ==
- (Fictional): In George Orwell's novel Nineteen Eighty-Four, English has become Newspeak, a language designed to make official propaganda easy and to make politically undesirable thoughts impossible to express.

== See also ==
- Coptic pronunciation reform
- Spelling reform
- English-language spelling reform
- Language revival
- Language planning
- Language policy
- List of language regulators
- Metrication
- International Phonetic Association
- Constructed language
- Gender-neutral language
- Newspeak
- Diglossia
- Otto Basler
- Simplified Chinese characters
- Text simplification

== Bibliography ==
- Geoffrey Lewis, The Turkish Language Reform: A Catastrophic Success, Oxford University Press, 2002, ISBN 0-19-925669-1.
