= List of Dutch dictionaries =

Notable dictionaries of the Dutch language include:

== Older Dutch dictionaries ==
- Etymologicum teutonicae linguae, the first known Dutch dictionary published by Cornelius Kiliaan in 1599. It continues to be a unique source of obsolete words today.
- 't Nieuw Woorden-Boeck der Regten ("The New Dictionary of Rights"), published by Adriaan Koerbagh in 1664
- Een Bloemhof van allerley lieflijkheyd ("A Flower Garden of All Sorts of Delights"), written by Koerbagh under the pseudonym Vreederijk Waarmond in 1668. This book explained various foreign words and caused a great religious opposition that forced him to flee to Leiden.

== Historical dictionaries ==
- Woordenboek der Nederlandsche Taal, the comprehensive academic dictionary of Dutch begun in 1863 and finished in 1998, listing all words in Dutch used since 1500.

== Current Dutch dictionaries ==
=== General dictionaries ===
Van Dale

- Van Dale Groot woordenboek van de Nederlandse taal, 16th edn. Antwerp/Utrecht: Van Dale Lexicografie, 2022. - referred to as the Dikke Van Dale or Grote Van Dale, it was first published in 1874 and remains the best-known and most widely read unabridged Dutch dictionary.
- Van Dale Groot Woordenboek hedendaags Nederlands, 4th edn. 2 vols. Utrecht: Van Dale, 2008 (out of print)

Prisma

- Martha Hofman, ed. Prisma groot woordenboek Nederlands: met onderscheid tussen Nederlands-Nederlands en Belgisch-Nederlands. Houten: Unieboek/Het Spectrum, 2018.
- André Abeling, ed. De grote Prisma Nederlands, 6th edn. Utrecht: Het Spectrum, 1997 (reprinted under the title Het Groene woordenboek (The Hague: Sdu, 2002). (out of print)

Koenen

- W. Th. de Boer et al., eds. Koenen woordenboek Nederlands, 30th edn. Utrecht: Koenen, 2006. (out of print)
- M.J. Koenen & J.B. Drewes, eds. Wolters’ woordenboek eigentijds Nederlands: Grote Koenen. Groningen: Wolters-Noordhoff, 1986. (out of print)

Kramers

- H. Coenders & H.J. Demeersseman, eds. Kramers’ woordenboek Nederlands: verklarend zakwoordenboek met zakentermen en synoniemen, 21st edn. Amsterdam: Elsevier, 1996 (repr. 1998, 2000, Utrecht: Het Spectrum, 2002). (out of print)
- Gijsbert van Kooten et al., eds. Kramers’ groot woordenboek Nederlands, 2nd edn. Amsterdam: Elsevier, 1986. (out of print)

Verschueren

- Frans Claes, ed. Verschueren groot encyclopedisch woordenboek, 10th edn. 2 vols. Antwerp: Standaard; The Hague: Sdu, 1996. (out of print) - this dictionary had many illustrations and pictures

There are also two notable Dutch word lists (spelling dictionaries):

- het Groene Boekje, the "Green Booklet", the official Dutch orthography published by the Dutch Language Union since 1954
- het Witte Boekje, the "White Booklet", published since 1998 and offers alternative Dutch spellings

=== Bilingual ===
English/Dutch

- Cora Bastiaansen et al., eds. Van Dale Groot woordenboek Nederlands-Engels, 4th edn. 2 vols. Utrecht: Van Dale Lexicografie, 2008. 2302 pp.
- Cora Bastiaansen et al., eds. Van Dale Groot woordenboek Engels-Nederlands, 4th edn. 2 vols. Utrecht: Van Dale Lexicografie, 2008. 2220 pp.
- A.F.M. de Knegt, C. de Knegt-Bos, & Prue Gargano, eds. Prisma woordenboek Nederlands-Engels. Houten: Het Spectrum, 2018. 672 pp.
- M.E. Pieterse-van Baars, ed. Prisma woordenboek Engels-Nederlands. Houten: Het Spectrum, 2018. 640 pp.

=== Specialist dictionaries ===
Legal

- Wasima Khan. Groot juridisch woordenboek. The Hague: Sdu, 2018.
- Joseph Moors in collab. with Siegfried Theissen. Juridisch woordenboek NF/FN, 7th edn. 2 vols. Bruges: Die Keure, 2015.
- Lieve Nackom & Mark van Hoecke. Juridisch zakwoordenboek, 2nd rev'd edn. Leuven: Acco, 2007.
- Bernard Tilleman, Steven Lierman, & Vincent Sagaert, eds. De Valks juridisch woordenboek, 5th edn. Antwerp: Intersentia, 2020.
- R.D.J. van Caspel & M.P. Damen. Fockema Andreae's juridisch woordenboek, 16th edn. Groningen: Noordhoff, 2016.

Linguistics

- Yvonne Halink. Taaltermen van A tot Z. Alphen aan den Rijn: Kluwer, 2003.
- Basisbegrippen taalkunde, 3 vols.
  - Hans Smessaert & Wivine Decoster. Basisbegrippen fonetiek en fonologie. Leuven: Acco, 2012.
  - Hans Smessaert, Jeroen van Craenenbroeck, & Guido J. vanden Wyngaerd. Morfologie en syntaxis, 2nd edn. Leuven: Acco, 2019.
  - Hans Smessaert. Semantiek en pragmatiek, 2nd edn. Leuven: Acco, 2019.

Medical

- J.J.E. van Everdingen & A.M.M. van den Eerenbeemt, eds. Pinkhof geneeskundig woordenboek, 12th rev'd & exp'd edn. Houten: Bohn Stafleu Van Loghum, 2012.

== See also ==
- List of French dictionaries
- List of German dictionaries
