= Buitenvrouw =

Suriname Dutch mistress

Buitenvrouw (IPA: [ˈbœytə(ɱ)ˌvrʌu]; lit. 'outside woman') is a Surinamese Dutch word for a mistress. Although traditionally considered a taboo, some contemporary Surinamese cultural figures like Jetty Mathurin and Frits Wols are found to satirize or criticize the institution.

After the Surinamese mass immigration to the Netherlands, some Surinamese developed extramarital affairs with local Dutch women, i.e., buitenvrouwen. The 1994 novel De buitenvrouw by Joost Zwagerman reverses the roles, featuring Iris, an Afro-Surinamese as the mistress of a White Dutchman.

The word buitenvrouw has become a part of the standard Dutch vocabulary and it is found in the Wordlist of the Dutch language.
