= Surinamese Dutch =

Dutch spoken in Suriname

- Surinaams-Nederlands
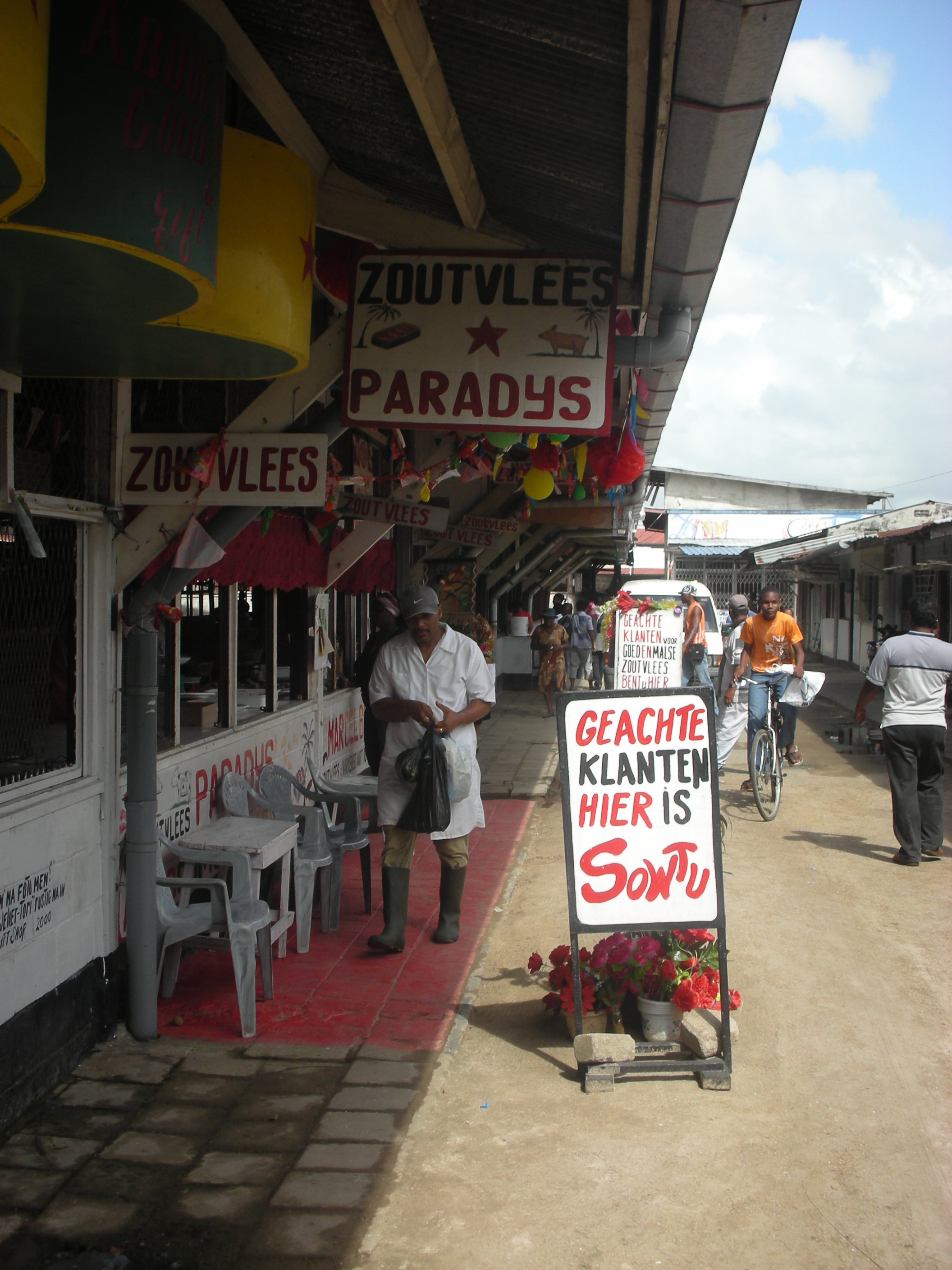
- Butcher signs in a Paramaribo market
- Pronunciation: [syːriˌnaːms ˈneːdərlɑnts]
- Native to: Suriname
- Region: French Guiana (Saint-Laurent-du-Maroni and Cayenne), Guyana (Georgetown)
- Native speakers: 600,000 (2024)
- Language family: Indo-European: Germanic; West Germanic; Weser–Rhine Germanic; Low Franconian; Dutch; Surinamese Dutch
- Early forms: Frankish: Old Dutch; Middle Dutch; Modern Dutch
- Writing system: Dutch alphabet

Official status
- Official language in: Suriname
- Regulated by: Dutch Language Union

Language codes
- ISO 639-3: –
- IETF: nl-SR
- Coordinates: 4°N 56°W

Surinamese Dutch (Surinaams-Nederlands, pronounced [syːriˌnaːms ˈneːdərlɑnts]) is the form of Dutch spoken in Suriname. Dutch is the sole official language in Suriname, a former colony of the Netherlands, and is spoken as a native language by about 80% of the population, most of whom are also bilingual in other languages such as Sranan Tongo, Sarnámi Hindustáni, English and Javanese.

Surinamese Dutch is easily intelligible with other forms of Dutch. It is generally easily distinguishable from other standardized forms of Dutch due to its accent and some loanwords adopted from other languages spoken in Suriname. Furthermore, as opposed to other languages that have different forms in the Americas compared to those in Europe (such as English and Portuguese), the regulation and thus standardised spelling of the Dutch language is done through a joint Dutch–Belgian–Surinamese organization, the Dutch Language Union, and thus has no regional differences regarding spelling. Suriname has been an associate member of this Nederlandse Taalunie since 2004. Therefore, many typical Surinamese words were added to the official Wordlist of Standard Dutch, known as "the Green Booklet" (Groene Boekje).

== History ==
Dutch was introduced in what is now Suriname when Paramaribo and its environs became a Dutch colony. The remainder of Suriname, however, remained in British hands. Only after the Dutch had lost New Netherland (now New York) to the British did they in exchange receive the rest of Suriname. Then, Dutch became the language of communication between Native Surinamese, African slaves, and the Dutch colonial administration. In 1876, the language also became official in the Surinamese education system, and new immigrants from British India and the Dutch East Indies also picked up the language. The immigrants also added features to spoken Dutch that are not present in the original European variants of Dutch, and preserved features (mostly vocabulary) that are not present in Dutch from the Netherlands.

== Phonology ==
In Surinamese Dutch, the voiced fricatives /v, z, ɣ/ have completely merged into the voiceless fricatives /f, s, x/.

== See also ==
- Standard Dutch
- Indonesian Dutch

== Bibliography ==
- De Schutter, Georges (2013) [First published 1994], "14 Dutch", in van der Auwera, Johan; König, Ekkehard (eds.), The Germanic Languages, Routledge, pp. 439–477, ISBN 978-0-415-05768-4
