= Johan Hendrik van Dale =

Dutch teacher, lexicographer and archivist

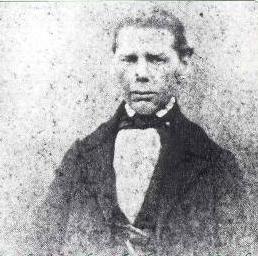
- Born: 15 February 1828; Sluis, Netherlands
- Died: 19 May 1872 (aged 44); Sluis, Netherlands
- Occupation: Lexicographer
- Known for: Van Dale Groot woordenboek van de Nederlandse taal

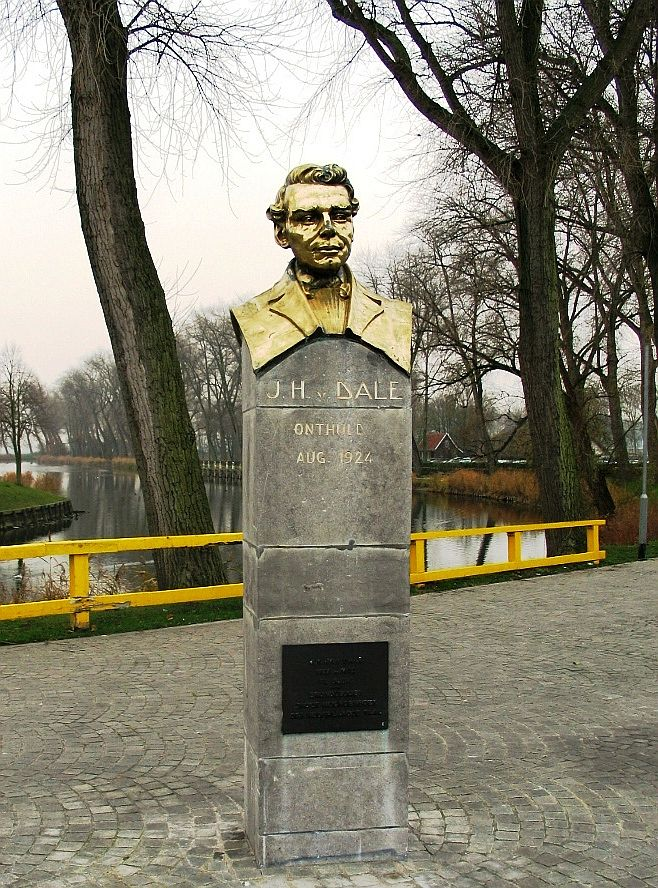
The Johan Hendrik van Dale memorial in Sluis

Johan Hendrik van Dale (pronounced [ˈjoːɦɑn ˈɦɛndrɪk fɑn ˈdaːlə]; 15 February 1828 - 19 May 1872) was a Dutch teacher, archivist, and lexicographer. He created Van Dale's Great Dictionary of the Dutch Language (Dutch: Van Dale Groot woordenboek van de Nederlandse taal); first published in 1874, after his death. It was, and in its subsequent editions remains, the leading dictionary of the Dutch language.

== Biography ==
Van Dale's parents were from Eeklo, in the Flemish province of East Flanders, Belgium. There was a smallpox epidemic in Meetjesland, in East Flanders: Abram (Abraham) van Dale (1799-1837) and his pregnant wife Pietje (Pieternella Johanna du Bois, 1802-1865) fled from it to Sluis, in the Netherlands; where their son, Johan Hendrik, was born.

Johan Hendrik must have been an excellent student and scholar. At the age of 16, he was awarded an official teaching certificate (onderwijsbevoegdheid), fourth class. Four years later, he was promoted to the second class. In 1854, he was appointed headmaster of the public school in Sluis. In 1857, he was appointed honorary city archivist. He wrote textbooks about the importance of clarity in language, and articles about the history of Sluis.

In 1866, he published his first lexigraphical work: Taalkundig handboekje, of alphabetische lijst van alle Nederlandsche woorden, die wegens spelling of taalkundig gebruik aan eenige bedenking onderhevig zijn ("Linguistic handbook, or alphabetical list of all Dutch words which, on account of their spelling or linguistic use, may be open to objection"). In 1867, he was asked to revise the Nieuw woordenboek der Nederlandsche taal ("New Dictionary of the Dutch Language" (nl)) of 1864 by Isaac Marcus and Nathan Salomon Calisch, which used the obsolete Siedenbeek spelling (nl) rather than the recently proposed De Vries and Te Winkel spelling (nl). He accepted the task, and completed it within four years. He wrote in the preface to the first edition, of 1872:

Het schrijven van een Woordenboek is een ondankbaar en verdrietig werk. Is er veel dat men heeft opgenomen of verbeterd, er is nog veel meer dat men vergeten heeft, dat de aandacht ontsnapt is en alzoo onverbeterd is gebleven.

(The writing of a dictionary is a thankless and sorrowful task. Even when there is much that one has included or corrected, there is still much more that one has forgotten, or has escaped attention, and therefore remains unimproved.)

The dictionary was in its final stages of completion - the first volume had already been published - when, in 1872, van Dale caught smallpox, and died of it. His pupil (kwekeling (nl)) Jan Manhave saw the rest of it through to publication.

The first edition of the Groot woordenboek received some criticism for not upholding academic standards of correctness; but was also widely praised. From its fourth edition on, and in its later revisions, van Dale's name has been attached to the Groot woordenboek as a sign of its authority in all matters concerning the Dutch language.
