= History of Dutch orthography =

The history of Dutch orthography covers the changes in spelling of Dutch both in the Netherlands itself and in the Dutch-speaking region of Flanders in Belgium. Up until the 18th century there was no standardization of grammar or spelling. The Latin alphabet had been used from the beginning and it was not easy to make a distinction between long and short vowels (a / aa). The word jaar (year) for instance, could be spelt jar, jaer, jair, or even yaer and iaer. With the spirit of the French Revolution, attempts were made to unify Dutch spelling and grammar. Matthijs Siegenbeek, professor at Leiden, was officially asked in 1801 to draw up a uniform spelling.

This did not prove popular, however, and another attempt was made in 1844. Still not entirely satisfactory, an ambitious project was proposed in 1851 to produce a large dictionary incorporating vocabulary of the past centuries. This led to a large degree of uniformity of spelling in the Netherlands and Belgium.

Various other attempts at simplification followed, culminating in the Spelling Act of 15 September 2005. This gives the Committee of Ministers of the Dutch Language Union the authority to determine the spelling of Dutch by ministerial decision. The law requires that this spelling be followed "at the governmental bodies, at educational institutions funded from the public purse, as well as at the exams for which legal requirements have been established". In other cases, it is recommended, but not mandatory, to follow the official spelling.

== Dutch spelling in the Middle Ages ==
The Dutch spoken between 1150 and 1500 is referred to as Middle Dutch. During this period there was no standardization of grammar. Authors generally wrote in their own dialects. Very often it is possible to tell from the language whether a text comes from Limburg, Brabant, or Holland. There was a lot of variation in the spelling. Words were often written as they were pronounced: lant (land), hi vint (he finds). The sound determined the spelling, irrespective of the basic word. This is no longer the case with modern Dutch, where land is still pronounced [lant] but spelled to conform with the plural landen, and hij vindt (he finds) (still [vint]) has both d of the infinitive (vinden) and the 3rd person singular ending t.

Karel ende Elegast (lines 1-6)
Fraeye historie ende al waer
Mach ic v tellen hoort near
Het was op enen auontstont
Dat karel slapen begonde
Tengelem op den rijn
Dlant was alle gader sijn.

From the very start of its written history, Dutch used the Latin alphabet. At first there were 23 letters: a, b, c, d, e, f, g, h, i, k, l, m, n, o, p, q, r, s, t, v, x, y, z. It was not until later that the j, u, and w were added.

A problem with the Latin alphabet was that it was not easy to make a distinction between long and short vowels (a / aa). Various solutions were found. At the beginning of the 13th century the word jaar (year) was spelt jar but other variants soon appeared: jaer and jair and later jaar or even yaer and iaer.

Another feature of Middle Dutch is that articles or prepositions were often joined onto the word they belonged to: tjaer (the year) and dlant (the land), as in the accompanying fragment from Karel ende Elegast. The text translates: “I will tell you a marvelous story, and a true one. Listen! One evening Charles was sleeping in Ingelheim on the Rhine. All the land you could see was his.”

There were also regional differences. Thus a clerk in Amsterdam in the 14th century would usually write lant, but one in Utrecht would write land.

The invention of printing led to a more standardized approach.

== The Siegenbeek spelling (1804, the Netherlands) ==
With the spirit of the French Revolution pervading all areas of thought, attempts were made to unify Dutch spelling and grammar. Matthijs Siegenbeek, professor at Leiden was officially asked in 1801 to draw up a uniform spelling; the priest Petrus Weiland was asked to write a grammar book. A few years later Siegenbeek published his spelling in Verhandeling over de Nederduitsche spelling ter bevordering van de eenparigheid in dezelve (Treatise on Lower Dutch spelling to promote uniformity herein) (1804) and a Woordenboek voor de Nederduitsche spelling (Dictionary for the Dutch Spelling) (1805). The government of the Batavian Republic officially introduced Siegenbeek's spelling on 18 December 1804.

Siegenbeek thought that the spelling should reflect refined Dutch pronunciation, taking into account the uniformity, etymology, and analogy. From the Siegenbeek spelling reforms, one gets the modern Dutch ij (called lange ij (long y) as distinct from the usually identically pronounced ei, called korte ei (short ei)). The word for iron ijzer used to be written yzer. Other spellings from Siegenbeek include: berigt (modern Dutch: bericht / report), blaauw (blauw / blue), Dingsdag (dinsdag / Tuesday), gooijen (gooien / to throw), magt (macht / power), kagchel (kachel / stove), koningrijk (koninkrijk /kingdom), muzijk (muziek / music) and zamen (samen / together).

Siegenbeek's spelling never achieved real popularity. In particular the poet Willem Bilderdijk fought against it, largely out of personal spite. He produced some of his own spellings which were popular in the 1830s and 1840s including the modern kachel (stove), plicht (instead of pligt /duty) and gooien (to throw). However, other spellings of his did not last: andwoord (antwoord / answer), hair (haar /hair/her), ontfangen (ontvangen / to receive), thands (thans / at present) and wareld (wereld / world).

== The Willems spelling (1844, Belgium) ==
In the Dutch-speaking areas in the south of the Netherlands, the Siegenbeek spelling was always unpopular. After Belgium declared independence in 1830, the spelling was denounced as “Hollandish” and “Protestant”. The spelling situation was quite chaotic with much discussion about whether to use a or ae, oo or oó, ee or eé, ei or ey, ui or uy, ambt or ampt, u or ue, and about the spelling of verbs.

In 1836, the Belgian government offered a reward for a proposal for a new spelling. In the end, the jury, headed by Jan Frans Willems, produced their own suggestion in 1839 which remained quite close to the Siegenbeek spelling in use in the Netherlands. They retained their own spelling of a few words such as kaes (cheese), ryden (to ride) and vuerig (fiery). The Willems spelling was given royal approval on 9 January 1844.

== The De Vries and Te Winkel spelling (1864, Belgium; 1883, The Netherlands; 1888, South Africa) ==
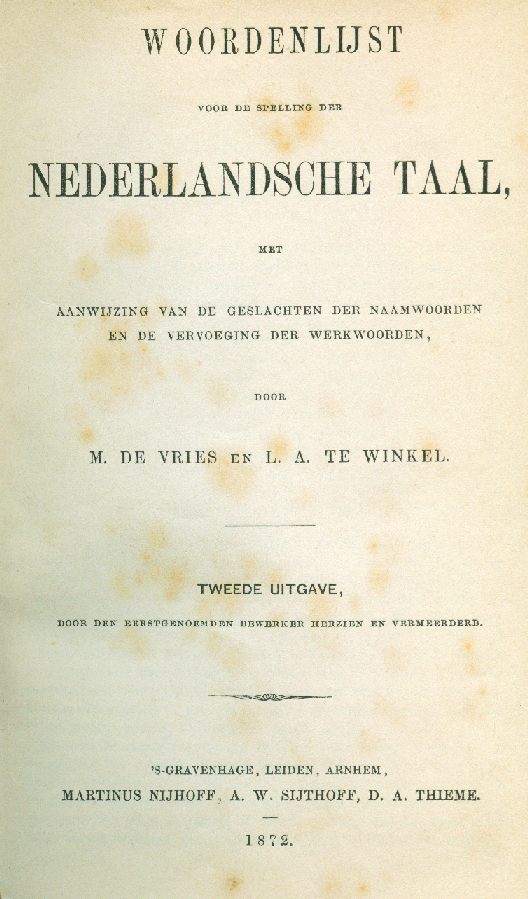
Title page of the Word List for the Spelling of the Dutch Language (1872), a predecessor of the Green Booklet.

The spelling used today both in the Netherlands and in Flanders (Dutch-speaking Belgium) is based on an orthography originally intended only for use in a dictionary. An ambitious project was proposed in 1851 at the Taal- en Letterkundig Congres (Linguistic and Literary Congress) in Brussels at which both the Netherlands and Flanders were represented. The project aimed to produce a large dictionary: Woordenboek der Nederlandsche Taal (WNT) (Dictionary of the Dutch Language), incorporating vocabulary of the past centuries.

There was a problem with this project: which spelling was to be used for the dictionary? There were three spelling systems in use at the time: the Willems spelling in Belgium, the Siegenbeek spelling in the Netherlands, and several variants of Bilderdijk's system. It would have been unacceptable to have used a mixture of these systems. In addition, the Siegenbeek system did not address certain issues such as when compounds were to be written as one word or the interpolation of letters in between. It was proposed to create a special dictionary spelling.

This spelling was established by the linguists Matthias de Vries and L.A. te Winkel. In 1863 Te Winkel published the results in De grondbeginselen der Nederlandsche spelling. Ontwerp der spelling voor het aanstaande Nederlandsch Woordenboek (The foundations of Dutch spelling. Project for the spelling of the forthcoming Dutch Dictionary). The spelling of De Vries and Te Winkel combined elements of the three current systems, providing a much needed solution to the chaos. By 21 November, the decision was accepted by a royal decree in Belgium. In 1866 De Vries and Te Winkel produced Woordenlijst voor de spelling der Nederlandsche taal (Vocabulary for the spelling of the Dutch language), which can be seen as a precursor of today's Groene Boekje (Green Booklet).

The Netherlands was slower in accepting the De Vries and Te Winkel spelling. Schools continued to use the Siegenbeek spelling until 1870, and in government circles it was not until 1883 that the new spelling started to be used. The De Vries and Te Winkel spelling eventually led to a large degree of uniformity of spelling in the Netherlands and Belgium.

The De Vries and Te Winkel spelling was introduced to the South African Republic (Transvaal) in 1888, after Dutch was declared to be the sole official language of the country by a constitutional amendment.

== The Kollewijn Spelling (1906, South Africa) ==
Teachers and linguists continued to object to certain features of the spelling. It was thought that too great an emphasis was being given to etymology. For instance, /eː/ was spelt differently in lezen ("to read", single e in open syllable for /eː/) and in heeten ("to be called", double e in open syllable for the same /eː/). This reflected the etymological distinction between "sharp-long" e (from Old Dutch long ē) and "soft-long" e (from Old Dutch short e and i that were lengthened in open syllables). However, the etymological reasoning was hard to teach, as the distinction was not made by most Dutch speakers anymore.

R.A. Kollewijn produced an article in 1891 Onze lastige spelling. Een voorstel tot vereenvoudiging (Our difficult spelling: a proposal for simplification). He emphasized the need for spelling to relate to pronunciation, therefore mensch (person/human) and Nederlandsch ought to become mens and Nederlands, respectively. Russisch (Russian) he thought should be spelt Russies and moeilijk (difficult) moeilik. Heeten would be written heten, but lezen would stay the same. However, academics from the Netherlands and Flanders challenged Kollewijn's proposals with the argument that said proposals would break down "the unity of the Dutch language" and would make it too "vulgar".

In South Africa, however, there was no such opposition to Kollewijn's proposals. This was due to the fact that by the end of the 19th century, many Afrikaners viewed Dutch as a difficult language to write, and as a consequence, there was a movement among many Dutch-language promoters in the South African states and colonies to simplify Dutch as a written language.

This movement came from the Zuid-Afrikaansche Taalbond (South African Language Association), as well as from teachers and journalists in the Orange Free State and the South African Republic (both of which had Dutch as an official language). The Language Association was founded in 1890 to promote the knowledge and usage of "the people's language", which was decided by 47 votes to 36 votes would be the Dutch language, as opposed to Afrikaans. The members of the Language Association came to realize that Dutch would be in a much stronger position to compete with the English language in South Africa if its spelling were to be simplified, and so convened a joint conference of Afrikaners from the Cape Colony, Natal, the Orange Free State and the Transvaal to suggest simplification of the written Dutch language in the direction of Kollewijn's proposals.

After the Second Boer War, the conference met again in Stellenbosch on 23 January 1903, and reaffirmed the simplification of Dutch orthography. The conference asked Willem Viljoen (a professor of language at Victoria College (the modern-day Stellenbosch University) and a member of the Language Association) to prepare a report on simplification. Viljoen consulted linguists and experts from the Netherlands and Flanders, and on 19 September 1903, the Commissie voor Taal en Letteren bij de Maatschappij der Nederlandsche Letterkunde te Leiden (the Commission for Language and Literature in Leiden at the Society for Dutch Literature) held a meeting which twenty professors attended.

Viljoen received support from the management for the simplification of written Dutch on 5 October 1903. On 28 December 1904, a language conference was held in Cape Town, and included delegates invited by the Language Association from Natal, the Transvaal and the Orange River Colony, and created the Vereenvoudigde Hollandse Spelling (the "Simplified Dutch Spelling") with the aim of reviving Dutch as a medium of education and as a public language.

The Simplified Dutch Spelling deviates from the De Vries-Te Winkel Spelling in the following manner:

- The letter ⟨e⟩ would not be doubled in open syllables: delen ("to divide"), kwekeling ("pupil teacher"), preken ("preach"), veren ("feathers"). However, the letter ⟨e⟩ would be doubled in word-final open syllables: twee ("two"), zee ("sea"), mee ("together"), dominee ("Reverend"). The derivatives of such words (tweede, zeeën) and compounds (tweeledig, zeeschip, veevoeder) retained the doubled ⟨e⟩.
- The letter ⟨o⟩, like the letter ⟨e⟩, would also not be doubled in open syllables: lopen ("walk"), stromen ("streams"), boze ("angry"), stro ("straw").
- The sound /i/ would be written as ⟨ie⟩ in open syllables: wielewaal ("oriole"), kieviet ("plover"), biezonder ("particular"). However, this change only applies to Germanic words.
- The suffixes ⟨-lijk⟩ and ⟨-lijks⟩ would be spelled as ⟨-lik⟩ and ⟨-liks⟩, respectively: gewoonlik ("commonly"), huiselik ("homely"), dageliks ("daily"), jaarliks ("yearly").
- The silent digraph ⟨ch⟩ following the letter ⟨s⟩ is deleted: vis ("fish"), mens ("human"), wensen ("to wish"), Nederlands ("Dutch"), tussen ("in between").
- The so-called tussenletters ⟨n⟩ and ⟨s⟩ would no longer be written in compounds: zedeleer ("ethics"), sterrekunde ("astronomy"), hondehok ("doghouse"), meisjeschool ("girls' school"), oorlogschip ("warship"). However, the letters ⟨n⟩ or ⟨s⟩ would be retained if they are a part of the stem of the first part of the compound: toetssteen ("touchstone"), tussentijd ("interim").
- The following changes were made to the spelling of loanwords:
  - The sound /i/ would be spelled as ⟨i⟩ in open syllables: individu ("individual"), naïveteit ("naïveté"), artikel ("article"). However, the same sound would also be spelled as ⟨ie⟩ in word-final open syllables: traditie ("tradition"), Februarie ("February"), kolibrie ("hummingbird"). Loanwords ending in ⟨ie⟩, or in ⟨ie⟩ followed by one consonant, would retain ⟨ie⟩ in the inflected form: lelieën ("lilies"), projektielen ("projectiles").
  - The suffix ⟨-isch⟩ would be spelled as ⟨-ies⟩: fantasties ("fantastic"), histories ("historic").
  - The digraph ⟨ae⟩ would be replaced by ⟨e⟩: ether ("ether"), prehistorie ("prehistory").
  - The letter ⟨c⟩, representing the sound /k/, would be replaced by ⟨k⟩: lokomotief ("locomotive"), akteur ("actor"), kontributie ("contribution").
  - The digraphs ⟨ph⟩ and ⟨rh⟩, representing the sounds /f/ and /r/, respectively, would be replaced by ⟨f⟩ and ⟨r⟩, as the case requires: alfabet ("alphabet"), fotografie ("photography"), retorika ("rhetoric"), rododendron ("rhododendron").
  - The letter ⟨x⟩ can either remain or be replaced by ⟨ks⟩ in "integrated" loanwords: eksamen or examen ("exam"), relaksatie or relaxatie ("relaxation"). However, certain loanwords which are not considered "integrated" are only spelled with ⟨x⟩: annexatie ("annexation"), maximaal ("maximal").
  - The digraph ⟨qu⟩ was replaced with ⟨kw⟩ where it represented the sound /kʋ/ or with ⟨k⟩ where it represented the sound /k/: likwidatie ("liquidation"), karantaine ("quarantine"). However, there were certain words to which this new rule did not apply: equinox ("equinox"), quadrille ("quadrille").
  - The most commonly used loanwords would be spelled as they were pronounced: faljiet ("bankrupt"), kanapee ("sofa"), rosbief ("roast beef"), toost ("toast").
- Adjectives derived from proper nouns would no longer be spelled with a capital letter: duits ("German"), amerikaans ("American"). In addition, adjectives derived from proper nouns which are compounds spelled with a hyphen would be spelled as one word without hyphenation: zuidafrikaans ("South African"), noordhollands ("North Hollandic").
- Proper nouns would retain the contemporary spelling: George, Visscher, Tusschenbroek, 's-Hertogenbosch.
- Instead of separating nouns into three genders (those being masculine, feminine and neuter), all nouns would be separated into two genders, namely, the common gender (de-words) and the neuter gender (het-words). All common gender nouns use the masculine pronouns hij ("he"), hem ("him") and zijn ("his"), with the exception of common gender nouns referring to women or to female animals, which continue to use the traditional feminine pronouns zij or ze ("she") and haar ("her"). One would therefore write: De regering heeft zijn besluit herzien, nadat hij hernieuwd advies ingewonnen had. ("The government has reviewed its decision after it had received new advice").
- The old Dutch case system would no longer be used in writing. Instead, the accusative case would use the article and pronoun declensions of the nominative case, the genitive case would be expressed with the preposition van followed by the article and the dative case would be expressed with the preposition aan followed by the article. In relation to the names of persons, the genitive case could also be expressed by using the suffix -s after the person's name or by the pronouns z'n (for men) or haar (for women).

The Simplified Dutch Spelling was not without opposition. The Dutch Reformed Church opposed the new spelling as it broke with the tradition of the Dutch language, and proponents of Afrikaans felt that the simplified orthography was still too difficult to learn.

In 1917, the Zuid-Afrikaanse Akademie voor Taal, Letteren en Kunst (the South African Academy for Language, Literature and Art) published the first edition of the Afrikaanse Woordelys en Spelreëls (the Afrikaans Wordlist and Spelling Rules), which set out the five principles which govern Afrikaans spelling as of 2019. The fourth principle is that the spelling "[should] deviate as little as possible from the Simplified Dutch Spelling". In 1925, the South African Parliament passed the Official Languages of the Union Act which declared that Afrikaans and Dutch were synonyms for the same language, but de facto replaced Dutch with Afrikaans in Government usage.

== The Marchant spelling (1934, the Netherlands) ==
In 1916, a Dutch commission looked into the possibility of a compromise between De Vries and Te Winkel and the Kollewijn spelling. This gradually led to adaptations: on 1 September 1934, the minister for Education, Marchant, accepted most of Kollewijn's proposals. (These proposals were extended to the Dutch East Indies in 1 August 1935.) The Netherlands and Belgium were starting to diverge once again.

The Marchant spelling included:

- abolition of declension for cases (e.g. den heer for accusative form of “de heer” (the gentleman))
- oo and ee at the end of open syllables (zoo (so), heeten (to be called)) changed to zo and heten, but ee at the end of a word remained (zee (sea)).
- unpronounced 'ch' in words like mensch (person/human) and visch (fish) disappeared.

The endings '-isch' (as in logisch (logical)) and '-lijk' (mogelijk (possible)) remained unchanged. Kollewijn's proposals '-ies' and '-lik' remain popular in some circles as a "progressive" spelling to the present day.

== The spelling reform of 1946 (Flanders) and 1947 (The Netherlands) ==
During World War II the governments of the Netherlands and Flanders decided to look for a way to restore the unification of spelling based on De Vries and Te Winkel. This led to the introduction of a simplification of the Marchant spelling being introduced in Flanders in 1946 and in the Netherlands the following year. In the Netherlands, the Act on the Spelling of the Dutch Language of 14 February 1947 was passed.

A Flemish-Dutch committee compiled a vocabulary which was published in 1954 in a green volume entitled “Woordenlijst van de Nederlandse taal” (Vocabulary of the Dutch language), which became known as “het Groene Boekje” (the Green Booklet). The spelling rules of the green book was officially adopted by Decree of 31 October 1953.

A "temporary" article of the binational agreement specified that place names would be left unchanged until appropriate legislation was passed by the competent national authorities. This happened rather fast in Belgium, where Saventhem became Zaventem, Crainhem became Kraainem, Coxyde became Koksijde etc., but the corresponding law was never passed in the Netherlands, where among many others Coevorden (not ~~Koevoorde~~) en Hooge Zwaluwe (not ~~Hoge Zwaluw~~) subsist to this day.

== The spelling reform of 1996 (The Netherlands and Flanders) ==
There was still dissatisfaction after 1954. Uncertainty arose about many words which had alternative spellings: one version was the preferred spelling (e.g. actie (action)), the other was the permissible or progressive spelling (e.g. aktie). The Dutch generally used the former, the Belgians the latter. Another problem was the speed at which Dutch was developing new vocabulary for which the 1954 dictionary was of no help for spelling definition.

In 1980, Belgium and the Netherlands concluded a treaty establishing the Dutch Language Union (Nederlandse Taalunie). Article 4(b) of the treaty gives the Taalunie the mandate to decide on matters concerning official spelling.

In 1994, after much discussion, new spelling rules were agreed upon. In 1995, the new Green Booklet was published; the alternative “progressive” spellings were abolished (it was now actie) and there were new rules about the n linking the compounds of words (pannekoek (pancake) became pannenkoek and bessesap (currant juice) became bessensap). The acute accent was made the only stress mark to be used on the vowel of stressed syllables, on the first two letters of vowels spelled with more than two letters, instead of the acute accent being used on long vowels and the grave accent being used on short vowels, for example de énige échte instead of the previous de énige èchte. Previously, the stress mark could be placed on single letters, on the first letter of digraphs composed of two different letters, or on the two double letters for long vowels.

The new spelling was officially adopted in the Netherlands by the Spelling Decree of 19 June 1996 (which came into force on 1 August 1996); the decree of 31 October 1953 was repealed. In Belgium, it was adopted on 30 May 1996 and came into effect on 1 September 1996.

== The spelling reform of 2006 (The Netherlands and Flanders) ==
In 1994 it was agreed that the vocabulary of het Groene Boekje should be revised every ten years without changing the actual rules of spelling. On 15 October 2005 the first of these revisions appeared. Only one rule concerning exceptions was made (the so-called Dandelion Rule): paardebloem (dandelion) and vliegezwam (fly agaric) became paardenbloem and vliegenzwam for consistency with other similar compounds, e.g. paardenstaart (horse-tail) and vliegenmepper (fly swatter). (Note that these 'n's are not normally pronounced.)

Apart from this there were a few individual changes. Here are some of the most important ones:

- Names of population groups are now spelt with a capital letter, even if there is no geographical area connected with the name: Kelt (Celt), Azteek (Aztec), and Eskimo (Inuit) are capitalized. Exceptions are made for names which cover a number of different ethnic groups: indiaan (North American Indian, First Nations) and zigeuner (Gypsy)
- Jood/jood (Jew) is a special case. It has a small initial letter when referring to the religious group, but is capitalized when referring to the ethnic or cultural group, as there people who identify with Jewish culture, but not (in public life) with Judaism as a religion (Jewish atheism, Jewish secularism, and so on). Thus, lowercase joden, christenen en moslims (Jews, Christians, and Muslims) are religious groups, but uppercase Joden, Europeanen en Marokkanen (Jews, Europeans, and Moroccans) are ethnic or cultural groups, or nationalities.
- There are changes for new English compounds: online instead of on line, full colour instead of fullcolour.
- A few rules for the hyphen have been changed: extreem-rechts (extreme right) is now spelt extreemrechts, ikroman (novel written in first person) is now ik-roman and a few more.
- A few compounds which had still not acquired the n now conform: paddenstoel (toadstool), dronkenman and dronkenlap (drunkard).

In the Netherlands, the Spelling Act of 15 September 2005 was passed. Coming into force on 22 February 2006, the 2005 law replaced the 1947 Act on the Spelling of the Dutch Language as the legislation for the legal basis of official spelling. The Spelling Act gives the Committee of Ministers of the Dutch Language Union the authority to determine the spelling of Dutch by ministerial decision. The law requires that this spelling be followed "at the governmental bodies, at educational institutions funded from the public purse, as well as at the exams for which legal requirements have been established". In other cases, it is recommended, but it is not mandatory to follow the official spelling.

The Decree on the Spelling Regulations 2005 of 2006 contains the annexed spelling rules decided by the Committee of Ministers on 25 April 2005. This decree entered into force on 1 August 2006, replacing the Spelling Decree of 19 June 1996. In Flanders, the same spelling rules are currently applied by the Decree of the Flemish Government Establishing the Rules of the Official Spelling and Grammar of the Dutch language of 30 June 2006.

Although government and educational establishments are required to conform, some newspapers and other publications in the Netherlands are refusing to use the new spelling and have released Het Witte Boekje (The White Booklet) as an alternative to the latest edition of Het Groene Boekje. This "white spelling" allows more than one spelling in several cases, e.g. presence or absence of linking ns, hyphens and capitalisation. It has, in return, been accused of being even more inconsistent than Het Groene Boekje. In Flanders, the white spelling is not used by any large media.

== Developments since 2006 ==
In 2019, prominent newspaper NRC updated its 2000 Style Book (Stijlboek) with several modernisations to be more in line with evolving everyday usage of the Dutch language. Some changes brought it closer to the Green Booklet or English-derived translations or transcriptions, such as Kairo to Caïro for Cairo, or Talibaan (NRC 2000) to Taliban (Green spelling; White spelling prescribes taliban), and brexit (White spelling) became Brexit (Green spelling). Certain new spellings removed redundant letters, such as Oekraïeners to Oekraïners (same pronunciation) for Ukrainians, sometimes moving a bit further away from English, such as Zimbabweanen to Zimbabwanen (as they are commonly called in Dutch) for Zimbabweans. On the other hand, Sri Lankezen became Sri Lankanen (Sri Lankans). Some words were replaced by descriptions, such as vrouwenvoetbal ("women's football") to voetbal voor vrouwen ("football for women"), and likewise mannenvoetbal to voetbal voor mannen, as these aren't separate kinds of sport, but the same sport organised by gender.
