= Matthijs Siegenbeek =

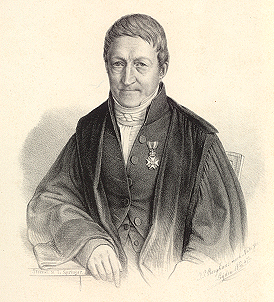
Matthijs Siegenbeek by J.P. Berghaus, 1847.

Matthijs Siegenbeek (Dutch pronunciation: [mɑˈtɛis ˈsiɣə(m)ˌbeːk]; 23 June 1774 in Amsterdam – 26 November 1854 in Leiden) was a Dutch academic. From 1797 to 1847 he was the first professor of the Dutch language at the University of Leiden. From 1803 he was the member, then secretary, of the head-office of that university's literary faculty. Initially he was a Mennonite voorganger in Dokkum.

== Family ==
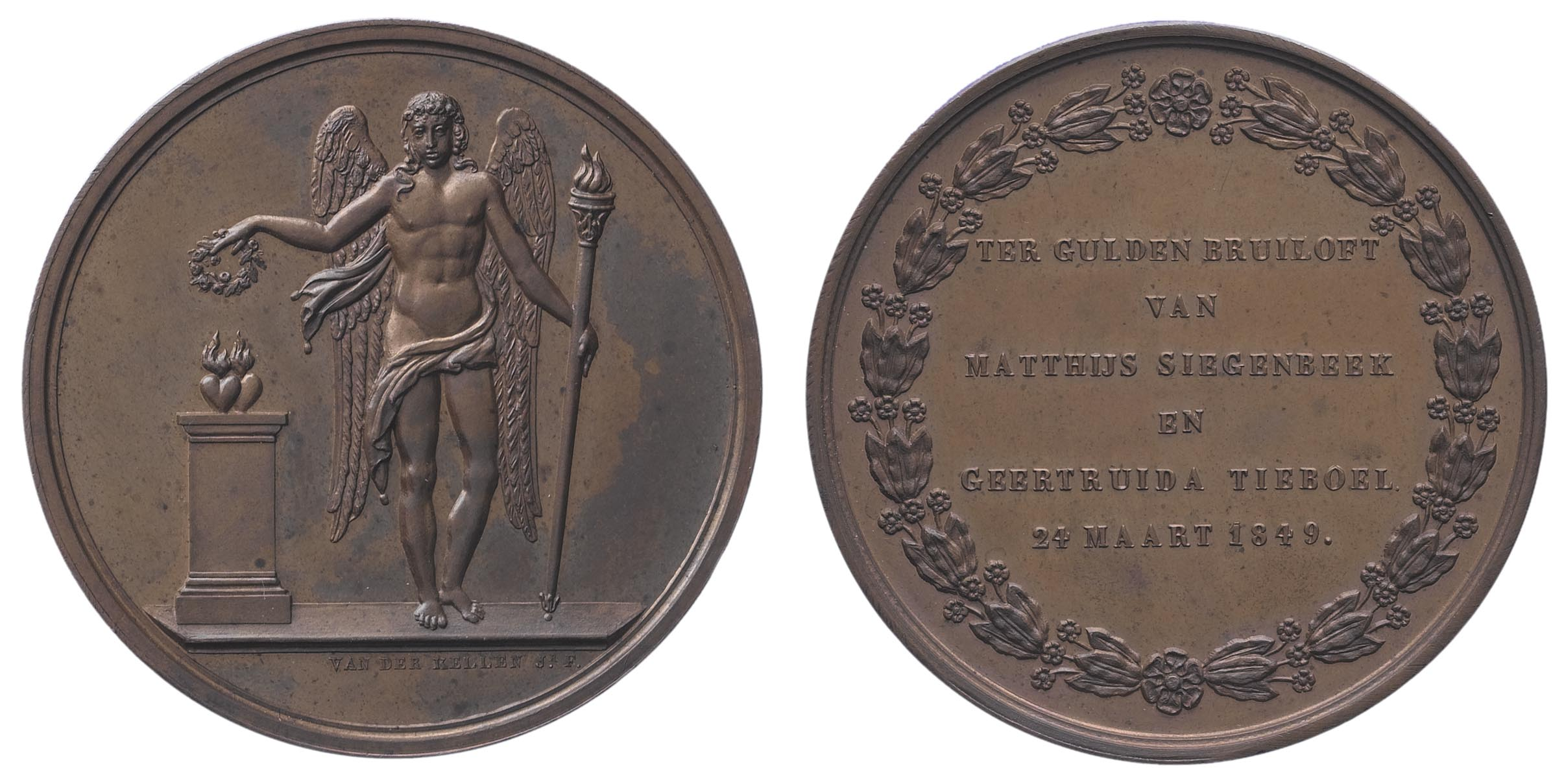
Golden wedding anniversary medal for Matthijs Siegenbeek and Geertruida Tieboel. 1849.

Siegenbeek married Geertruida Tieboel (1773-1851) in 1799. They had two sons: Daniel Tieboel Siegenbeek and Jan Willem Siegenbeek.

== Spelling-Siegenbeek ==
In 1804 Siegenbeek set out the official spelling of Dutch. This was attacked by the poet Willem Bilderdijk. From 1818 he became a member of the Teylers First Society and continued in that position until his death.

== Works ==
- Verhandeling over de Nederduitsche spelling ter bevordering van de eenparigheid in dezelve, 1804
- Woordenboek voor de Nederduitsche spelling, 1805
- Betoog van den rijkdom en de voortreffelijkheid der Nederlandsche taal, en opgave der middelen om de toenemende verbastering van dezelve tegen te gaan, 1810
- Over de middelen ter vorming van een Nationaal Tooneel, 1817
- Beknopte Geschiedenis der Nederlandsche Letterkunde, 1826
- De eer van Wagenaar en die van Jacoba van Beijeren, 1835

== Bibliography ==
- Rob Naborn, De Spelling-Siegenbeek (1804), Master's thesis, VU University Amsterdam, 1985.
- Noordegraaf, Jan. De 'Maatschappij' en haar grammatici. pp. 121–124. hdl:1871/10962.
- Jan Noordegraaf, Norm, geest en geschiedenis. Nederlandse taalkunde in de negentiende eeuw. Dordrecht & Cinnaminson: Foris 1985.
