= Witte Boekje =

Alternative spelling list of the Dutch language

Witte Boekje (English: White Booklet) is the popular name for the Spelling Guide of Our Language (Spellingwijzer Onze Taal), a publication of the Genootschap Onze Taal. The first edition was released in October 1998; the latest edition is the tenth and was released in 2004. All these publications are explanations of the official spelling rules, as set by the Dutch Language Union.

Although the words in the guide have been based on the same official rules as the Green Booklet, the spellings in the two booklets do not always match. To aid users, the differences between the White Booklet and Green Booklet are made clear by appending GB to the differently spelled words.

After the spelling reform of 2005, the White Booklet was updated explicitly in a break with the Dutch Language Union.

== Boycott of official spelling ==
The latest edition will, because of the changes, be unable to bear the official certification mark of the Dutch Language Union. The White Booklet will then become the spelling prescription of a group of media organizations and companies in the Netherlands who will boycott the new spelling rules. These parties have jointly announced in December 2005 that they will not switch to the new official spelling, and they had not done as of August 1, 2006. These are de Volkskrant, Trouw, NRC Handelsblad, Elsevier, HP/De Tijd, De Groene Amsterdammer, Vrij Nederland, Planet Internet, TekstNet, and the NOS. They will follow the spelling as determined by the White Booklet.

Even though Onze Taal is a society for both Belgium and the Netherlands, no major media or publisher in Flanders uses the White Booklet.
