= Van Dale =

Leading dictionary of the Dutch language

Van Dale's Great Dictionary of the Dutch Language
- Dikke Van Dale
- Author: drs. C. A. den Boon, prof. dr. D. Geeraerts (editors)
- Original title: Van Dale's Groot woordenboek der Nederlandsche taal
- Language: Dutch
- Subject: Dictionary
- Publisher: Van Dale Lexicografie
- Publication date: 2005
- Publication place: Netherlands
- Pages: 4464
- ISBN: 90-6648-427-6
- OCLC: 697452253
- Dewey Decimal: 439.3
- LC Class: PF625 .G44 2005

Van Dale Great Dictionary of the Dutch Language (Dutch: Van Dale Groot woordenboek van de Nederlandse taal, pronounced [vɑn ˈdaːlə ˌɣroːt ˈʋoːrdə(m)ˌbuk fɑn də ˈneːdərlɑntsə ˈtaːl]), called Dikke Van Dale ([ˈdɪkə vɑn ˈdaːlə], lit. 'Thick Van Dale') for short, is the leading dictionary of the Dutch language. The latest edition was published in April 2022.

== History ==
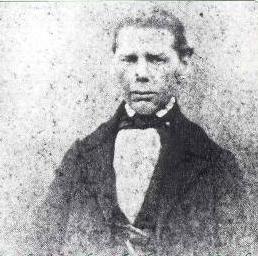
J.H. van Dale (1828–1872)

Van Dale's dictionary was first published after the death of Johan Hendrik van Dale, who had started work on his New Dictionary of the Dutch Language (Nieuw woordenboek der Nederlandsche taal [niu ˈʋoːrdə(m)ˌbuɡ dɛr ˈneːdərlɑntsə ˈtaːl]) in 1867. This was built upon the original same-named 1864 dictionary of I.M. Calisch and N.S. Calisch. Van Dale did not see the new work published in his lifetime, as he died in 1872. It was finished by his student Jan Manhave. Today it is published by the private company Van Dale Lexicografie.

Commonly nicknamed Dikke Van Dale ("thick Van Dale") and Grote Van Dale ("big Van Dale") due to its size, the dictionary is published in three volumes (A-I, J-R, S-Z). It is usually updated every 7–8 years, and the 15th edition was published in 2015. Today there are compilations, pocket editions, electronic editions on CD-ROM and an online edition on the Van Dale website. The online edition includes a free version for the more common words, and a subscription-based professional version with access to the full 90,000-word dictionary.

== Position ==
The Van Dale Dictionary is a private endeavor, to be distinguished from the government-published "Green Booklet" that lists the official spelling mandated for schools and government employees. Van Dale includes the official spelling of the words as well, but it further provides their definitions. The position of the editors is clear: the actual use is decisive. Disapproved words are marked as such, but not omitted. The purpose is to inform the reader, therefore the responsibility of using certain words lies solely on them.

== Editions ==
Edition	Year	Editors	Notes
1st edition	1864	I. M. Calisch en N. S. Calisch	Nieuw woordenboek der Nederlandsche taal; in one volume.
	1872	J. H. van Dale	Facsimile-reprint 1992
	1874	J. H. van Dale	
3rd edition	1884	J. Manhave	
4th edition	1898	H. Kuiper jr., dr. A. Opprel en P. J. van Malssen jr.	New title: Van Dale's Groot woordenboek der Nederlandsche taal.
5th edition	1914	P. J. van Malssen jr.	
6th edition	1924	P. J. van Malssen jr.	
7th edition	1950	dr. C. Kruyskamp, dr. F. de Tollenaere	
8th edition	1961	dr. C. Kruyskamp	
9th edition	1970	dr. C. Kruyskamp	For the first time in two volumes (A-N, O-Z).
10th edition	1976	dr. C. Kruyskamp	
11th edition	1984	prof. dr. G. Geerts en dr. H. Heestermans, with collaboration of dr. C. Kruyskamp	For the first time in three volumes (A-I, J-R, S-Z).
12th edition	1992	prof. dr. G. Geerts en dr. H. Heestermans	Republished in 1995 with the new official spelling.
13th edition	1999	prof. dr. G. Geerts, drs. C. A. den Boon	Also appeared on CD-ROM, edited by prof. dr. D. Geeraerts.
14th edition	2005	drs. C. A. den Boon, prof. dr. D. Geeraerts	Used the new official spelling of 2005. New title: Van Dale Groot woordenboek van de Nederlandse taal.
15th edition	2015	drs. C. A. den Boon, Ruud Hendrickx	Published on 23 September 2015.
16th edition	2022	drs. C. A. den Boon, Ruud Hendrickx	First edition with a gender-neutral "x" for several words which refer to non-binary people.

== See also ==
- Dutch Language Union
- Woordenboek der Nederlandsche Taal
- Word list of the Dutch language
