= Dutch Language Union =

Dutch language regulator

Nederlandse Taalunie Dutch Language Union
- Logo

- A map showing the member states of the Dutch Language Union (red)
- Headquarters: The Hague, Netherlands; Brussels, Belgium
- Official language: Dutch (Standard Dutch)
- Membership: Belgium; Netherlands; Suriname

Leaders
  - Secretary-general: Kris Van de Poel

Establishment
  - Treaty: 9 September 1980

Population
  - 2022 estimate: ~25 million
- Website taalunie.org

The Dutch Language Union (Dutch: Nederlandse Taalunie [ˈneːdərlɑntsə ˈtaːlˌyni], NTU) is an international regulatory institution that governs issues regarding the Dutch language. It is best known for its spelling reforms which are promulgated by member states, grammar books, the Green Booklet and its support of Dutch language courses and studies worldwide. It was founded on a treaty concluded between the Netherlands and Belgium (in respect of the Flemish Community) on 9 September 1980. Suriname has been an associate member of the Taalunie since 2004.

== History ==
The Dutch-speaking world.

The Dutch Language Union was established by a treaty between Belgium and the Netherlands, signed on 9 September 1980 in Brussels. It succeeded the "Cultural Agreement" (governing more than just language) between the two countries signed just after the Second World War. This agreement was redone in 1995, after the federalization of Belgium, and a new treaty was signed between the Netherlands and Flanders. On 12 December 2003, president of the Committee of Ministers of the Dutch Language Union Medy van der Laan and Minister of Education of Suriname Walter Sandriman signed the agreement to the accession of Suriname to the union. The accession was ratified by the National Assembly of Suriname in 2004 and came into force in 2005.

Standard Dutch (Algemeen Nederlands, often abbreviated to AN) is the standard language as it is taught in schools and used by authorities in the Netherlands, Flanders, Suriname, and the Dutch Caribbean. The Dutch Language Union defines what is AN and what is not. Since efforts to "uplift" people had come to be considered rather presumptuous, the earlier name Algemeen Beschaafd Nederlands ("Common Civilised Dutch") and its abbreviation, ABN, were replaced with Algemeen Nederlands (AN). The implication that non-standard varieties are not civilised was thus removed.

== Word list ==
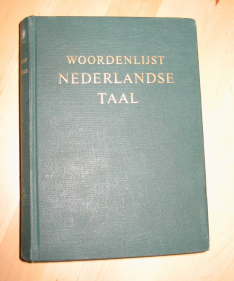
Groene Boekje (1954)

An important change that was carried out by the Dutch Language Union was the modification of Dutch orthography in 1995, regarding in particular the writing of the interfix -n in many compounds. Among the Union's publications is the well-known Word list of the Dutch language (Woordenlijst Nederlandse taal), commonly known as the “Groene boekje” ("Green booklet", because of its distinctive green colour). The green booklet is the official orthographic and grammatical reference of the Dutch language. It is laid out like a vocabulary, including plural forms and spelling but without actual word definitions.

The most recent version of the Green Booklet appeared on 13 October 2015. Its content does not differ from the previous version of 2005, which included a somewhat controversial spelling reform that was not received well in general because a part of the spelling reforms of 1996 was changed again. In December 2005, most of the Dutch mainstream media announced a boycott. In August 2006, they released a 'White book' as their own, subtly different guideline. Currently these two spellings are both in use, sometimes confusing people; the 'green' one is used by schools and officials, the 'white' one by papers, magazines and television stations.

In Belgium, on the other hand, the spelling reform was generally accepted without protest.

== Dictionary ==
The Van Dale dictionary is commonly accepted as the most authoritative Dutch dictionary. Commonly named the Dikke Van Dale ("Thick" Van Dale due to its size) the dictionary is split into three volumes (A–I, J–R, S–Z) and is usually updated every 7–8 years. The 15th edition was published on 23 September 2015.

The Woordenboek der Nederlandsche Taal (WNT) is a historic dictionary that includes all words used from 1500 to the present day. Work began in 1864 and was finished in 1998 when the last volume was published. It has 46 volumes, occupying about 3 metres of shelf space, with about 400,000 words on 49,255 pages. In 2001, three additional volumes were published containing mostly words from the 20th century that were not included in the previous 43 volumes. This dictionary is published by Instituut voor Nederlandse Lexicologie and can be found online.

== Dutch as a foreign language ==
The Dutch Language Union supports the teaching of Dutch in primary and secondary schools in the neighbouring regions and countries. It concerns Belgium (Brussels and Wallonia; 350,000 learners), Germany (Lower Saxony and North Rhine-Westphalia, 40,000 learners) and France (Nord-Pas-de-Calais, 8,000 learners).

The Union also supports the study of Dutch language and culture at universities and schools worldwide. Approximately 14,000 people study the Dutch language and Dutch literature at 140 institutions.

== Organisation ==
=== Internal organisation ===
The NTU has offices in The Hague and Brussels, and it comprises four institutions:

- The Secretariat-General, responsible for preparing and implementing policy, headed by Kris Van de Poel since March 2020
- The Committee of Ministers, containing the ministers of education and culture from the Netherlands and Flanders;
- The Interparliamentary Commission, made up of members of the Dutch and Flemish parliaments;
- The Council for Dutch Language and Literature.

==== Instituut voor de Nederlandse Taal ====
The binational (Belgium and the Netherlands) Instituut voor de Nederlandse Taal ("Institute for the Dutch Language") in Leiden, formerly Instituut voor Nederlandse Lexicologie, works under the auspices of the Dutch Language Union, and is responsible for the Woordenboek der Nederlandsche Taal (Dictionary of the Dutch language). In addition, the institute publishes a number of dictionaries, including the Old Dutch Dictionary, the Early Middle Dutch Dictionary, and an etymological dictionary; and databases, including databases indexing various newspapers and magazines, and legal documents. The Spoken Dutch Corpus has contemporary Dutch as spoken in the Netherlands and Flanders, including audio recordings of Standard Dutch.

==== Royal Academy of Dutch Language and Literature ====
The Royal Academy of Dutch Language and Literature was founded in Belgium in 1886 to stimulate the culture and literature of Flanders. It is the official advisory board to the Flanders government, and publishes the Materiaal Willems database, based on the dialect surveys done by Pieter Willems, containing material from dialects in Flanders, the Netherlands, and French Flanders.

=== External connections ===
The organisation is also responsible for the external linguistic policy of the Netherlands and Flanders and is active in Indonesia and South Africa, two countries with historic links with the Dutch language. Nevertheless, cooperation with South Africa is not limited to the Afrikaans language but aimed also at fostering multilingualism.

The purposes of the organisation are limited to Dutch language and Dutch-language literature, and are hence not as wide as those of the Community of Portuguese Language Countries, La Francophonie or the Commonwealth of Nations.

The Treaty on the Dutch Language Union foresees the possibility that the Kingdom of the Netherlands extends application to NTU members’ parts outside Europe. The organs of the NTU are its Committee of Ministers (composed of the ministers of education and culture of the Dutch and Flemish Governments), its Secretariat-General, an Interparliamentary Committee (composed of members of the States General of the Netherlands and the Flemish Parliament) and a Dutch Language and Literature Council (composed of twelve independent experts). There are specific arrangements for the participation of Suriname in the organisation's inner workings.

=== Member states ===
The basis of the Taalunie is a treaty between the Kingdom of the Netherlands and the Kingdom of Belgium, the two sovereign states that constitute the Union. For the Kingdom of the Netherlands, the treaty is only applicable to its European territory. The treaty allows for two types of extensions:

- membership of other sovereign states through an "association membership"
- extension to other territories of the Kingdom of the Netherlands (presently: Aruba, Curaçao, Sint Maarten, and the Caribbean Netherlands).

In 2004, Suriname signed an "associative treaty" with the Taalunie. From 27 November 2013 the treaty also applies to the Caribbean Netherlands. The three autonomous Caribbean countries of the Kingdom of the Netherlands, Aruba, Curaçao, and Sint Maarten, are designated as candidate member states. Additionally, Indonesia and South Africa are considered "special partners" of the Dutch Language Union.

== Prizes ==
The Dutch Language Union has administered the Prijs der Nederlandse Letteren (Dutch Literature Prize) since 1986. The prize is awarded every three years to an author from the Netherlands, Belgium or Suriname. It is considered one of the most prestigious prizes in Dutch language literature.

Another literary award administered by the Dutch Language Union is the Toneelschrijfprijs for playwrights.

== See also ==
- Dutch orthography
- List of language regulators
- Verwantschapslanden
- Genootschap Onze Taal
- Digital Library for Dutch Literature

By ISO 639-3 code
Enter an ISO code to find the corresponding language article.
