= Woordenboek der Nederlandsche Taal =

Dictionary of Dutch language

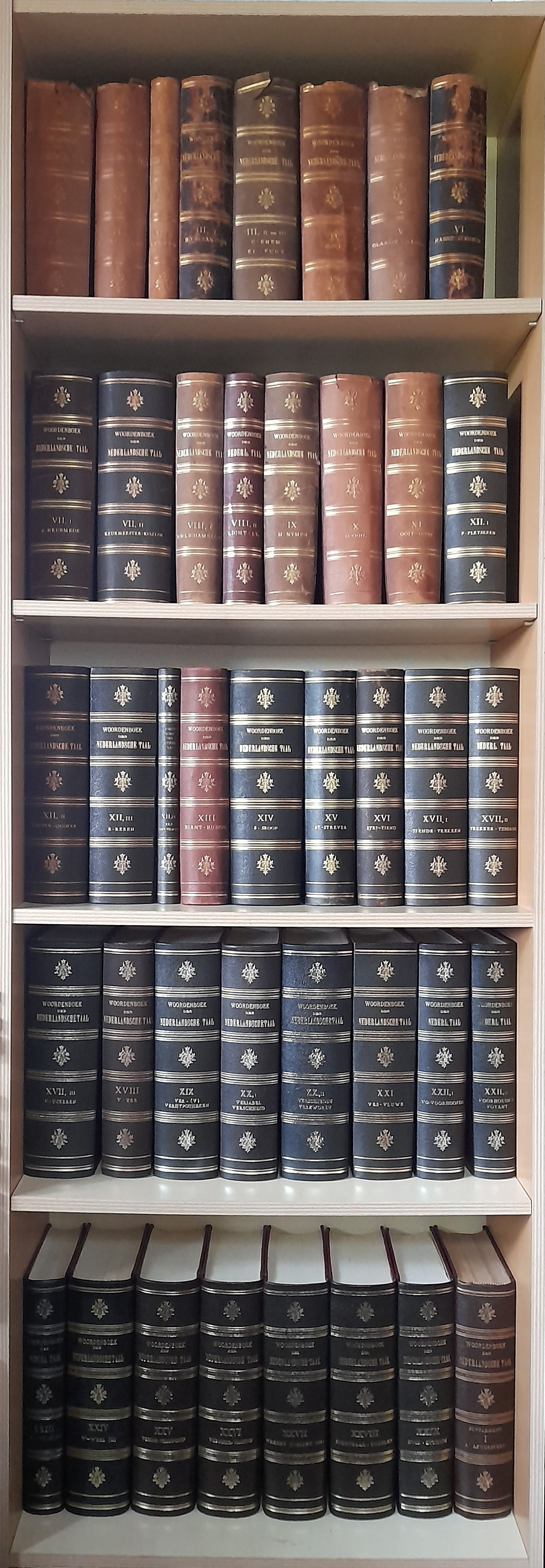
3 metres WNT

The Woordenboek der Nederlandsche Taal (WNT; lit. 'Dictionary of the Dutch language') is a dictionary of the Dutch language. It contains between 350,000 and 400,000 entries describing Dutch words from 1500 to 1976. The paper edition consists of 43 volumes (including three supplements) on 49,255 pages. It is believed to be the largest dictionary in the world in number of pages. The dictionary was nearly 150 years in the making from 1849; the first volume was published in 1864, and the final volume was presented to Albert II of Belgium and Beatrix of the Netherlands in 1998.

== Background ==
The WNT follows the formula of the Oxford English Dictionary and the Deutsches Wörterbuch in being a historical dictionary whose entries are based on primary sources of actual usage.

Its impetus was the inaugural 1849 Nederlandsch Congres ("Dutch Congress"), a conference of linguists from the Netherlands and Belgium. The conference, which was held alternately south and north of the border, ran from 1849 to 1912; its goal was to (re-)establish contacts between Netherlanders and Belgians (after Belgium split off from the Netherlands in 1830) and to lend strength to the Flemish movement in Belgium (which was up against the widespread influence of French). At that first conference, in August 1849 at Ghent University, it was proposed that a dictionary be written "for our common tongue". Dutch linguist Matthias de Vries (1820–1892) was given the task of writing it.

Financial support for the project came from the Dutch and Belgian governments. Also part of the project was spelling reform; De Vries's coauthor Lammert Allard te Winkel (1809–1868) designed the new orthography, though the system is named for both. Another project related to the WNT was the development of a dictionary of Middle Dutch, the Middelnederlandsch Woordenboek (1885–1927), by two students of De Vries, Jacob Verdam and Eelco Verwijs.

De Vries published the first fascicle (A-Aanhaling) in 1864; the first volume (A-Ajuin) in 1882. The last (Zuid-Zythum) was published in 1998; afterward, three supplements to the original dictionary text containing modern-day Dutch words were published, in 2001. It is published by the Instituut voor Nederlandse Lexicologie ("Institute for Dutch Lexicology"), which works under the supervision of the Dutch Language Union, and is available for free online.

== Importance ==
Besides its sheer size and its historical value, the WNT is credited with supporting the "integrationist" movement in Flanders, that is, those who sought a rapprochement between the speakers of Dutch in the Netherlands and Belgium. The De Vries-Te Winkel orthography was made mandatory by the Belgian government in 1864, and shortly thereafter by the Dutch government. It still underlies the rules for orthography and has thus contributed to orthographic unity between the two countries.

== See also ==
- Van Dale
