= Word List of the Dutch Language =

Dutch official spelling guide

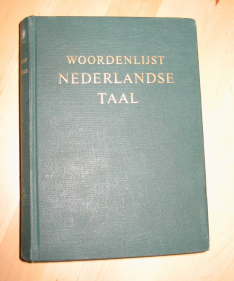
A Green Book from 1954.

The Word List of the Dutch Language (Dutch: Woordenlijst Nederlandse Taal; Dutch pronunciation: [ˈʋoːrdə(n)ˌlɛist ˈneːdərlɑntsə ˈtaːl]) is a spelling dictionary of the Dutch language. It is officially established by the Dutch Language Union (Nederlandse Taalunie). Because of the colour of its published form, it is better known as the Green Book (Groene Boekje; Dutch pronunciation: [ˈɣrunə ˈbukjə]).

== History ==
The first publication was in 1954. A revised word list was not released until 1990. The most recent publication was in 2015. Its content does not differ from the previous version published in 2005. The current spelling has been effective since 1 August 2006.

The Green Book is published by Sdu in the Netherlands and Lannoo in Flanders. It is available in a paper edition and on CD-ROM at a fee. The Dutch Language Union offers a free official internet version of the list at Woordenlijst.org. The latest edition was released on 13 October 2015.

In 1994, the committee of Ministers of the Dutch Language Union decided that the word list of the Green Book would be updated every ten years. The 2005 edition was the first time that Surinamese Dutch words were included; about 500 of them were added as was agreed upon when Suriname joined the Language Union in January 2005.

The Green Book should not be confused with the Green Dictionary, which is also a publication of Sdu.

== Green Book versus White Book ==
Sample of spelling differences
Green (official)	White (Onze Taal)	English meaning
1 aprilgrap	1-aprilgrap	April Fools' joke
50 eurobiljet	50-eurobiljet	50 euro note
dedain	dédain	disdain
de-escalatie	deëscalatie	de-escalation
gedachtegoed	gedachtengoed	body of thought
oud en nieuw	Oud en Nieuw	New Year's Eve
paddenstoel	paddestoel	toadstool
pannenkoek	pannekoek	pancake
per se	persé	per se
stand-by	standby	standby
van tevoren	vantevoren	beforehand

The 2005 edition of the Green Book was criticised for its complicated rules such as the rules on how to use an -n between certain compound words. Opponents claimed that the rules were too fuzzy and changing too fast, causing problems in education. Teachers and pupils complained about the lack of simple rules, and the many exceptions to the rules.

In December 2005, a number of major Dutch newspapers (including NRC, De Volkskrant and Trouw), magazines and the broadcaster NOS announced that they would boycott the latest edition of the Green Book. It was said to be too confusing, illogical and unworkable to be usable. Instead, they would follow the spelling which is laid out in the 2004 White Book (Witte Boekje) by the Genootschap Onze Taal. In Flanders, media use the official Green Book-spelling.

In November 2023, the NOS announced that they were switching to the official Green Book-spelling. They argued that there were fewer disagreements between the Dutch Language Union and Genootschap Onze Taal, and that the spelling from the Green Book was often more logical. Various emails received by the NOS involved readers pointing out 'errors', which often concerned cases of White spellings that readers perceived to be 'incorrect', as they had already come to accept the 2005 official Green spelling as the standard. An important factor was that only the Green spelling was taught in schools, and the resulting demographic shift significantly increased the number of official spelling users versus alternate spelling users over the course of 18 years. The NOS' own editors were often confused by the double Green and White spelling choices offered by the Taalloket ("Language Desk") of Onze Taal as well. Sometimes, the NOS had already switched; for example, from persé (White) to per se (Green), as readers were often annoyed by persé.

== Yellow Book ==
Although the Green Book is also the official list of words for Flemish people, they use some words which are not in the Green Book and not known by people in the Netherlands. However, those words are so commonly used in Flanders, most people are not aware these are not official. Many of those words are even used in newspapers, magazines, and television.

On 31 January 2015, Flemish newspaper De Standaard and some language professionals published the Yellow Booklet (Dutch: Gele Boekje). In this book, various words are printed in black or in grey. A black word is a non-official word, but De Standaard would allow it in their newspapers. A grey word is a non-official word which should not be used. It was the intention that other Flemish media would make use of the Yellow Book.

== See also ==
- History of Dutch orthography
- Van Dale Great dictionary of the Dutch language, uses the official spelling since 2005.
- White Book, the wordlist of the Genootschap Onze Taal.
