= Genootschap Onze Taal =

Dutch society

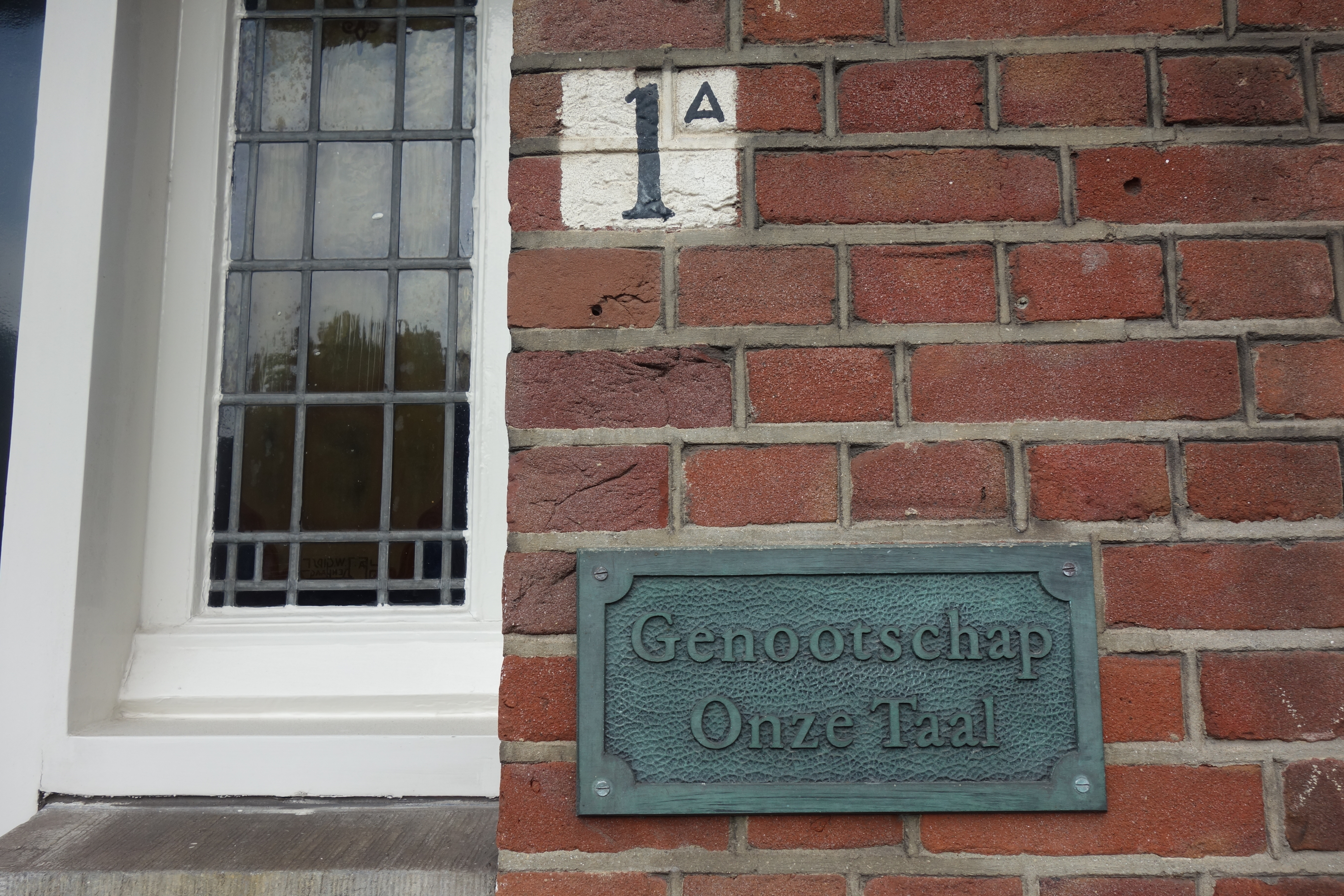
Onze Taal offices

Genootschap Onze Taal ('Society Our Language') is a Dutch society dedicated to the Dutch language. It was founded in 1931, initially to guard the language against what was then seen as creeping invasion of Germanisms into the language.

The society publishes a journal, "Onze Taal", and a number of regularly appearing booklets on spelling, the most notable of which is the White Booklet. It also has an advisory service called the Taaladviesdienst.
