= Dutch Braille =

Dutch Braille may refer to:

- Dutch six-dot Braille
- Dutch eight-dot Braille
