= Dutch language =

West Germanic language

Dutch
- Nederlands
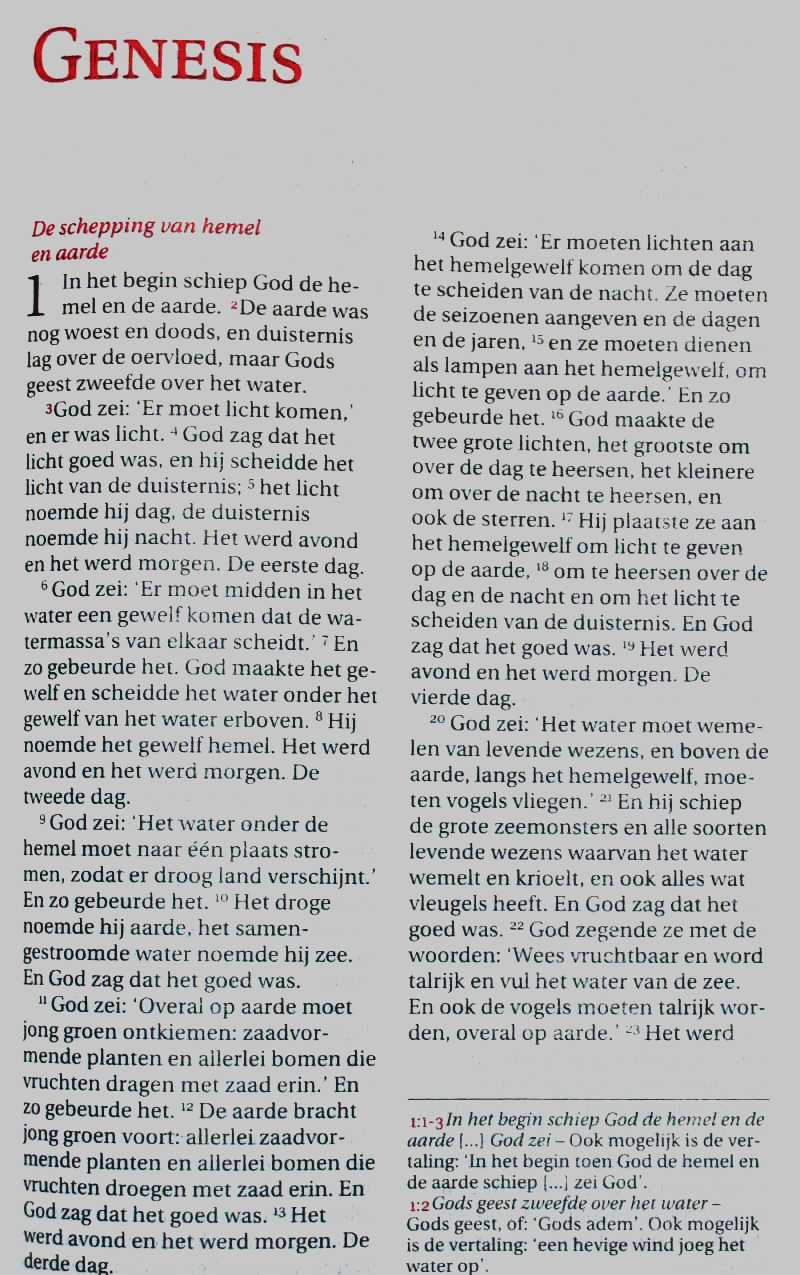
- Book of Genesis 1 in Dutch
- Pronunciation: [ˈneːdərlɑnts]
- Native to: The Netherlands; Belgium; Suriname; France (Nord)
- Ethnicity: Dutch; Flemings; Indo; Afrikaners; Cape Coloureds; Cape Malays; Griquas; Oorlams; Basters; Indo-Surinamese; Javanese Surinamese; Chinese Surinamese; Afro-Surinamese; Indigenous Surinamese; European Surinamese
- Native speakers: 25 million (2021); Total (L1 plus L2 speakers): 30 million (2021)
- Language family: Indo-European: Germanic; West Germanic; Weser–Rhine Germanic; Low Franconian; Dutch
- Early forms: Frankish: Old Dutch; Middle Dutch; Modern Dutch
- Standard forms: Standard Dutch
- Dialects: Central; Flemish; Stadsfries; West Frisian Dutch; Surinamese Dutch; Jersey Dutch
- Writing system: Latin (Dutch alphabet); Dutch six-dot Braille; Dutch eight-dot Braille
- Signed forms: Signed Dutch (NmG)

Official status
- Official language in: Netherlands; Aruba; Bonaire; Curaçao; Sint Eustatius; Sint Maarten; Saba; Belgium; Suriname; Organisations: Benelux; Caribbean Community; European Union; PROSUR; South American Union
- Regulated by: Nederlandse Taalunie (Dutch Language Union)

Language codes
- ISO 639-1: nl
- ISO 639-2: dut (B) nld (T)
- ISO 639-3: nld Dutch/Flemish
- Glottolog: dutc1256
- Linguasphere: 52-ACB-a
- Dutch-speaking world (included are areas of daughter language Afrikaans)

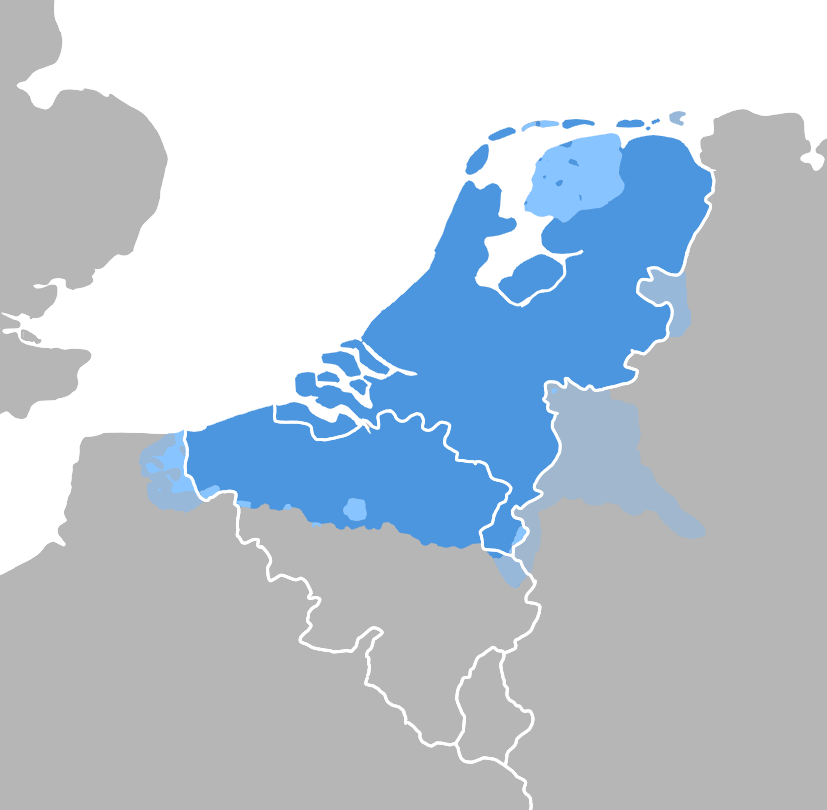
- Distribution of Standard Dutch in Europe; Dark blue where a majority language, light blue for Brussels, Friesland and Low Franconian dialects in France and Germany

A young woman speaking Dutch (1:32)

Dutch (Endonym: Nederlands [ˈneːdərlɑnts], Nederlandse taal) is a West Germanic language of the Indo-European language family, spoken by about 25 million people as a first language and 5 million as a second language and is the third most spoken Germanic language. In Europe, Dutch is the native language of most of the population of the Netherlands and Flanders (which includes 60% of the population of Belgium). Dutch was one of the official languages of South Africa until 1925, when it was replaced by Afrikaans, a separate but partially mutually intelligible daughter language of Dutch. (Note: Afrikaans is a daughter language of Dutch; see Booij 1999, p. 2, Jansen, Schreuder & Neijt 2007, p. 5, Mennen, Levelt & Gerrits 2006, p. 1, Booij 2003, p. 4, Hiskens, Auer & Kerswill 2005, p. 19, Heeringa & de Wet 2007, pp. 1, 3, 5. Afrikaans was historically called Cape Dutch; see Deumert & Vandenbussche 2003, p. 16, Conradie 2005, p. 208, Sebba 1997, p. 160, Langer & Davies 2005, p. 144, Deumert 2002, p. 3, Berdichevsky 2004, p. 130. Afrikaans is rooted in 17th-century dialects of Dutch; see Holm 1989, p. 338, Geerts & Clyne 1992, p. 71, Mesthrie 1995, p. 214, Niesler, Louw & Roux 2005, p. 459. Afrikaans is variously described as a creole, a partially creolised language, or a deviant variety of Dutch and has a vastly simplified grammar compared to Dutch; see Sebba 2007, p. 116.) Afrikaans, depending on the definition used, may be considered a sister language, spoken, to some degree, by at least 16 million people, mainly in South Africa and Namibia, (Note: It has the widest geographical and racial distribution of all official languages of South Africa; see Webb 2003, pp. 7, 8, Berdichevsky 2004, p. 131. It has by far the largest geographical distribution; see Alant 2004, p. 45. It is widely spoken and understood as a second or third language; see Deumert & Vandenbussche 2003, p. 16, Kamwangamalu 2004, p. 207, Myers-Scotton 2006, p. 389, Simpson 2008, p. 324, Palmer 2001, p. 141, Webb 2002, p. 74, Herriman & Burnaby 1996, p. 18, Page & Sonnenburg 2003, p. 7, Brook Napier 2007, pp. 69, 71. An estimated 40 percent of South Africans have at least a basic level of communication in Afrikaans; see Webb 2003, p. 7 McLean & McCormick 1996, p. 333. Afrikaans is a lingua franca of Namibia; see Deumert 2004, p. 1, Adegbija 1994, p. 26, Batibo 2005, p. 79, Donaldson 1993, p. xiii, Deumert & Vandenbussche 2003, p. 16, Baker & Prys Jones 1998, p. 364, Domínguez & López 1995, p. 399, Page & Sonnenburg 2003, p. 8, CIA 2010. While the number of total speakers of Afrikaans is unknown, estimates range between 15 and 23 million. Afrikaans has 16.3 million speakers; see de Swaan 2001, p. 216. Afrikaans has a total of 16 million speakers; see Machan 2009, p. 174. About 9 million people speak Afrikaans as a second or third language; see Alant 2004, p. 45, Proost 2006, p. 402. Afrikaans has over 5 million native speakers and 15 million second language speakers; see Réguer 2004, p. 20. Afrikaans has about 6 million native and 16 million second language speakers; see Domínguez & López 1995, p. 340. In South Africa, over 23 million people speak Afrikaans to some degree, of which a third are first-language speakers; see Page & Sonnenburg 2003, p. 7. L2 "Black Afrikaans" is spoken, with different degrees of fluency, by an estimated 15 million; see Stell 2008, p. 1. Dutch and Afrikaans share mutual intelligibility; see Gooskens 2007, p. 453, Holm 1989, p. 338, Baker & Prys Jones 1998, p. 302, Egil Breivik & Håkon Jahr 1987, p. 232. For written mutual intelligibility; see Sebba 2007, p. 116, Sebba 1997, p. 161. It is easier for Dutch speakers to understand Afrikaans than the other way around; see Gooskens 2007, p. 454.) and evolving from Cape Dutch dialects.

In South America, Dutch is the native language of the majority of the population of Suriname, and spoken as a second or third language in the multilingual Caribbean island countries of Aruba, Curaçao and Sint Maarten. All these countries have recognised Dutch as one of their official languages, and are involved in one way or another in the Dutch Language Union. The Dutch Caribbean municipalities (St. Eustatius, Saba and Bonaire) have Dutch as one of the official languages. In Asia, Dutch was used in the Dutch East Indies (now mostly Indonesia) by a limited educated elite of around 2% of the total population, including over 1 million indigenous Indonesians, until it was banned in 1957, but the ban was lifted afterwards. About a fifth of the Indonesian language can be traced to Dutch, including many loan words. Indonesia's Civil Code has not been officially translated, and the original Dutch language version dating from colonial times remains the authoritative version. Up to half a million native speakers reside in the United States, Canada and Australia combined, (Note: 410,000 in the United States, 159,000 in Canada, 47,000 in Australia; see Simpson 2009, p. 307. Between 200,000 and 400,000 in US alone; see McGoldrick, Giordano & Garcia-Preto 2005, p. 536.) and historical linguistic minorities on the verge of extinction remain in parts of France and Germany. (Note: In France, a historical dialect called French Flemish is spoken. There are about 80,000 Dutch speakers in France; see Simpson 2009, p. 307. In French Flanders, only a remnant of 20,000 Flemish-speakers remain; see Berdichevsky 2004, p. 90. French Flemish is spoken in the north-west of France by an estimated population of 20,000 daily speakers and 40,000 occasional speakers; see European Commission 2010. A dialect continuum exists between Dutch and German through the Kleverlandish, Lower Saxon and Limburgish dialects. In 1941, 400,000 Indonesians spoke Dutch, and Dutch exerted a major influence on Indonesian; see Sneddon 2003, p. 161. In 1941, about 0.5% of the inland population had a reasonable knowledge of Dutch; see Maier 2005, p. 12. At the beginning of World War II, about one million Asians had an active command of Dutch, while an additional half million had a passive knowledge; see Jones 2008, p. xxxi. Many older Indonesians speak Dutch as a second language; see Thomson 2003, p. 80. Some of the ethnic Chinese in Indonesia speak Dutch amongst each other; see Tan 2008, pp. 62–64, Erdentuğ & Colombijn 2002, p. 104. Dutch is spoken by "smaller groups of speakers" in Indonesia; see Bussmann 2002, p. 83. Some younger Indonesians learn Dutch as a foreign language because their parents and grandparents may speak it and because in some circles, Dutch is regarded as the language of the elite; see Vos 2001, p. 91. At present, only educated people of the oldest generation, in addition to specialists who require knowledge of the language, can speak Dutch fluently; see Ammon et al. 2006, p. 2017. Around 6.4% of present-day Indonesian vocabulary can be traced back to Dutch words, see Tadmor 2009, p. 698.)

Dutch is one of the closest relatives of both German and English, (Note: Dutch and English are the closest relatives of German; see Abraham 2006, p. 124. Dutch is the closest relative of German; see Czepluch & Abraham 2004, p. 13. Dutch and English are closely related; see Ingram 1989, p. 494, Todd 2004, p. 37, Kager 1989, p. 105, Hogg 2002, p. 134, De Bot, Lowie & Verspoor 2005, pp. 130, 166, Weissenborn & Höhle 2001, p. 209, Crisma & Longobarde 2009, p. 250. Dutch and English are very closely related languages; see Fitzpatrick 2007, p. 188. Dutch is, after Frisian, the closest relative of English; see Mallory & Adams 2006, p. 23, Classe 2000, p. 390, Hogg 2002, p. 3, Denning, Kessler & Leben 2007, p. 22. English is most closely related to Dutch; see Lightfoot 1999, p. 22, and more so than to German; see Sonnenschein 2008, p. 100, Kennedy Wyld 2009, p. 190.) and is colloquially said to be "roughly in between" them. (Note: Dutch is traditionally described as morphologically between English and German, but syntactically closer to German; see Clyne 2003, p. 133. Dutch has been positioned to be between English and German; see Putnam 2011, p. 108, Bussmann 2002, p. 83, Müller 1995, p. 121, Onysko & Michel 2010, p. 210. Typologically, Dutch takes a position between German and English, a similar word order to that of German, grammatical gender, and a largely Germanic vocabulary with many cognates to German words. It is morphologically close to English, and the case system and subjunctive have largely fallen out of use; see Swan & Smith 2001, p. 6.) Dutch, like English, has not undergone the High German consonant shift, does not use Germanic umlaut as a grammatical marker, has largely abandoned the use of the subjunctive, and has levelled much of its morphology, including most of its case system. (Note: Dutch shares with English its simplified morphology and the abandonment of the grammatical case system; see Booij 1999, p. 1, Simpson 2009, p. 309. In contrast to German, case markings have become vestigial in English and Dutch; see Hogg 2002, p. 134, Abraham 2006, p. 118, Bussmann 2002, p. 83, Swan & Smith 2001, p. 6. The umlaut in Dutch and English matured to a much lesser extent than in German; see Simpson 2009, p. 307, Lass 1994, p. 70, Deprez 1997, p. 251.) Features shared with German, however, include the survival of two to three grammatical genders – albeit with few grammatical consequences (Note: Dutch has effectively two genders; see Booij 1999, p. 1, Simpson 2009, p. 309, De Vogelaer 2009, p. 71. Grammatical gender has little grammatical consequences in Dutch; see Bussmann 2002, p. 84) – as well as the use of modal particles, final-obstruent devoicing, and (similar) word order. (Note: Simpson 2009, p. 307, Booij 1999, p. 1 Dutch and German do not have a strict SVO order as in English; see Hogg 2002, pp. 87, 134. In contrast to English, which has SVO as the underlying word order, for Dutch and German this is SV_{1}OV_{2} or (in subordinate clauses) SOV; see Ingram 1989, p. 495, Jordens & Lalleman 1988, pp. 149, 150, 177. Dutch has almost the same word order as German; see Swan & Smith 2001, p. 6.) Dutch vocabulary is mostly Germanic; it incorporates slightly more Romance loans than German, but far fewer than English. (Note: Dutch vocabulary has more Germanic words than English and more Romance words than German; see Simpson 2009, p. 309, Swan & Smith 2001, p. 17. Dutch vocabulary is mostly Germanic; see Swan & Smith 2001, p. 6. Dutch has the most similar vocabulary to English; see Mallory & Adams 2006, p. 1.)

== Name ==
In Belgium, the Netherlands and Suriname, the native official name for Dutch is Nederlands (historically Nederlandsch before the Dutch orthographic reforms). Sometimes Vlaams ("Flemish") is used as well to describe Standard Dutch (Standaardnederlands) in Flanders, whereas Hollands ("Hollandic") is occasionally used as a colloquial term for the standard language in the central and northwestern parts of the Netherlands.

English uses the adjective Dutch as a noun for the language of the Netherlands and Flanders. The word is derived from Proto-Germanic *þiudiskaz. The stem of this word, *þeudō, meant "people" in Proto-Germanic, and *-iskaz was an adjective-forming suffix, of which -ish is the Modern English form. Theodiscus was its Latinised form and used as an adjective referring to the Germanic vernaculars of the Early Middle Ages. In this sense, it meant "the language of the common people". The term was used as opposed to Latin, the non-native language of writing and the Catholic Church. It was first recorded in 786, when the Bishop of Ostia writes to Pope Adrian I about a synod taking place in Corbridge, England, where the decisions are being written down "tam Latine quam theodisce" meaning "in Latin as well as common vernacular".

According to a hypothesis by De Grauwe, In northern West Francia (i.e. modern-day Belgium) the term would take on a new meaning during the Early Middle Ages, when, within the context of a highly dichromatic linguistic landscape, it came to be the antonym of *walhisk (Romance-speakers, specifically Old French). The word, now rendered as dietsc (Southwestern variant) or duutsc (Central and Northern Variant), could refer to the Dutch language itself, as well as a broader Germanic category depending on context. During the High Middle Ages "Dietsc/Duutsc" was increasingly used as an umbrella term for the specific Germanic dialects spoken in the Low Countries, its meaning being largely implicitly provided by the regional orientation of medieval Dutch society: apart from the higher echelons of the clergy and nobility, mobility was largely static and hence while "Dutch" could by extension also be used in its earlier sense, referring to what today would be called Germanic dialects as opposed to Romance dialects, in many cases it was understood or meant to refer to the language now known as Dutch.

In the Low Countries Dietsch or its early modern Dutch form Duytsch as an endonym for Dutch gradually went out of common use and was gradually replaced by the Dutch endonym Nederlands. This designation (first attested in 1482) started at the Burgundian court in the 15th century, although the use of neder, laag, bas, and inferior ("nether" or "low") to refer to the area known as the Low Countries goes back further in time, with the Romans referring to the region as Germania Inferior ("Lower" Germania). It is a reference to the Low Countries' downriver location at the Rhine–Meuse–Scheldt delta near the North Sea.

From 1551, the designation Nederlands received strong competition from the name Nederduytsch (literally "Low Dutch", Dutch being used in its archaic sense covering all continental West Germanic languages). It is a calque of the aforementioned Roman province Germania Inferior and an attempt by early Dutch grammarians to give their language more prestige by linking it to Roman times. Likewise, Hoogduits ("High German") and Overlands ("Upper-landish") came into use as a Dutch exonym for the various German dialects used in neighboring German states. Use of Nederduytsch was popular in the 16th century but ultimately lost out over Nederlands during the close of the 18th century, with (Hoog)Duytsch establishing itself as the Dutch exonym for German during this same period.

In the 19th century Germany saw the rise of the categorisation of dialects, with German dialectologists terming the German dialects spoken in the mountainous south of Germany as Hochdeutsch ("High German"). Subsequently, German dialects spoken in the north were designated as Niederdeutsch ("Low German"). The names for these dialects were calqued by Dutch linguists as Nederduits and Hoogduits. As a result, Nederduits no longer serves as a synonym for the Dutch language. In the 19th century, the term "Diets" was revived by Dutch linguists and historians as well, as a poetic name for Middle Dutch and its literature.

== History ==
Map of the pre-Roman Iron Age in Northern Europe culture(s) associated with the Proto-Germanic language, ca 500–50 BCE. The area south of Scandinavia is the Jastorf culture.

Old Dutch can be discerned more or less around the same time as Old English (Anglo-Saxon), Old High German, Pre-Old Frisian, and Old Saxon. These names are derived from the modern standard languages. In this age no standard languages had yet developed, while a perfect West Germanic dialect continuum remained present; the division reflects the contingent future contribution dialect groups would have to the later languages. The early form of Dutch was a set of Franconian dialects spoken by the Salian Franks in the 5th century. These happened to develop through Middle Dutch to Modern Dutch over the course of fifteen centuries. During that period, they forced Old Frisian back from the western coast to the north of the Low Countries, and influenced or even replaced Old Saxon spoken in the east (contiguous with the Low German area). On the other hand, Dutch has been replaced in adjacent lands in present-day France and Germany. The division into Old, Middle and Modern Dutch is mostly conventional, since the transition between them was very gradual. One of the few moments when linguists can detect something of a revolution is when the Dutch standard language emerged and quickly established itself. The development of the Dutch language is illustrated by the following sentence in Old, Middle and Modern Dutch:

- Irlôsin sol an frithe sêla mîna fan thên thia ginâcont mi, wanda under managon he was mit mi (Old Dutch)
- Erlossen sal [hi] in vrede siele mine van dien die genaken mi, want onder menegen hi was met mi (Middle Dutch)
- Verlossen zal hij in vrede ziel mijn van degenen die genaken mij, want onder menigen hij was met mij (Modern Dutch, same word order)
- Hij zal mijn ziel in vrede verlossen van degenen die mij genaken, want onder menigen was hij met mij (Modern Dutch, default word order)
- He will deliver my soul in peace from those who approach me, because, amongst many, he was with me (English)

=== Origins ===
Among the Indo-European languages, Dutch is grouped within the Germanic languages, meaning it shares a common ancestor with languages such as English, German, and the Scandinavian languages. All Germanic languages are subject to the Grimm's law and Verner's law sound shifts, which originated in the Proto-Germanic language and define the basic features differentiating them from other Indo-European languages. This is assumed to have taken place in approximately the mid-first millennium BCE in the pre-Roman Northern European Iron Age.

The Germanic languages are traditionally divided into three groups: East (now extinct), West, and North Germanic. They remained mutually intelligible throughout the Migration Period. Dutch is part of the West Germanic group, which also includes English, Scots, Frisian, Low German (Old Saxon) and High German. It is characterised by a number of phonological and morphological innovations not found in North or East Germanic.

=== Frankish (3rd–5th centuries) ===
The Frankish language itself is not directly attested, the only possible exception being the Bergakker inscription, found near the Dutch city of Tiel, which may represent a primary record of 5th-century Frankish. Although some place names recorded in Roman texts such as vadam (modern Dutch: wad, English: "mudflat"), could arguably be considered as the oldest single "Dutch" words, the Bergakker inscription yields the oldest evidence of Dutch morphology. However, interpretations of the rest of the text lack consensus.

The Franks emerged in the southern Netherlands (Salian Franks) and central Germany (Ripuarian Franks), and later descended into Gaul. The name of their kingdom survives in that of France. Although they ruled the Gallo-Romans for nearly 300 years, their language, Frankish, became extinct in most of France and was replaced by later forms of the language throughout Luxembourg and Germany in around the 7th century. It was replaced in France by Old French (a Romance language with a considerable Old Frankish influence).

However, the Old Franconian language did not die out at large, as it continued to be spoken in the Low Countries, and subsequently evolved into what is now called Old Low Franconian or Old Dutch in the Low Countries. In fact, Old Frankish could be reconstructed from Old Dutch and Frankish loanwords in Old French.

=== Old Dutch (5th–12th centuries) ===
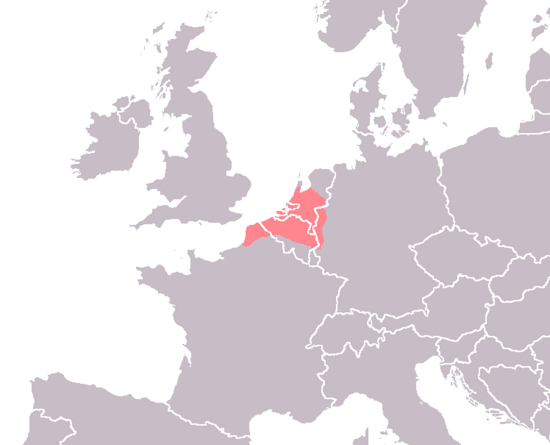
Area in which Old Dutch was spoken

The term Old Dutch or Old Low Franconian refers to the set of Franconian dialects (i.e. West Germanic varieties that are assumed to have evolved from Frankish) spoken in the Low Countries during the Early Middle Ages, from around the 5th to the 12th century. Old Dutch is mostly recorded on fragmentary relics, and words have been reconstructed from Middle Dutch and Old Dutch loanwords in French. Old Dutch is regarded as the primary stage in the development of a separate Dutch language. It was spoken by the descendants of the Salian Franks who occupied what is now the southern Netherlands, northern Belgium, part of northern France, and parts of the Lower Rhine regions of Germany.

The High German consonant shift, moving over Western Europe from south to west, caused a differentiation with the Central and High Franconian in Germany. The latter would as a consequence evolve (along with Alemannic, Bavarian and Lombardic) into Old High German. At more or less the same time the Ingvaeonic nasal spirant law, moving over Western Europe from west to east, led to the development of Old English (or Anglo-Saxon), Old Frisian and Old Saxon. Hardly influenced by either development, Old Dutch probably remained relatively close to the original language of the Franks. However, the language did experience developments of its own, such as very early final-obstruent devoicing. In fact, the find at Bergakker indicates that the language may already have experienced this shift during the Old Frankish period.

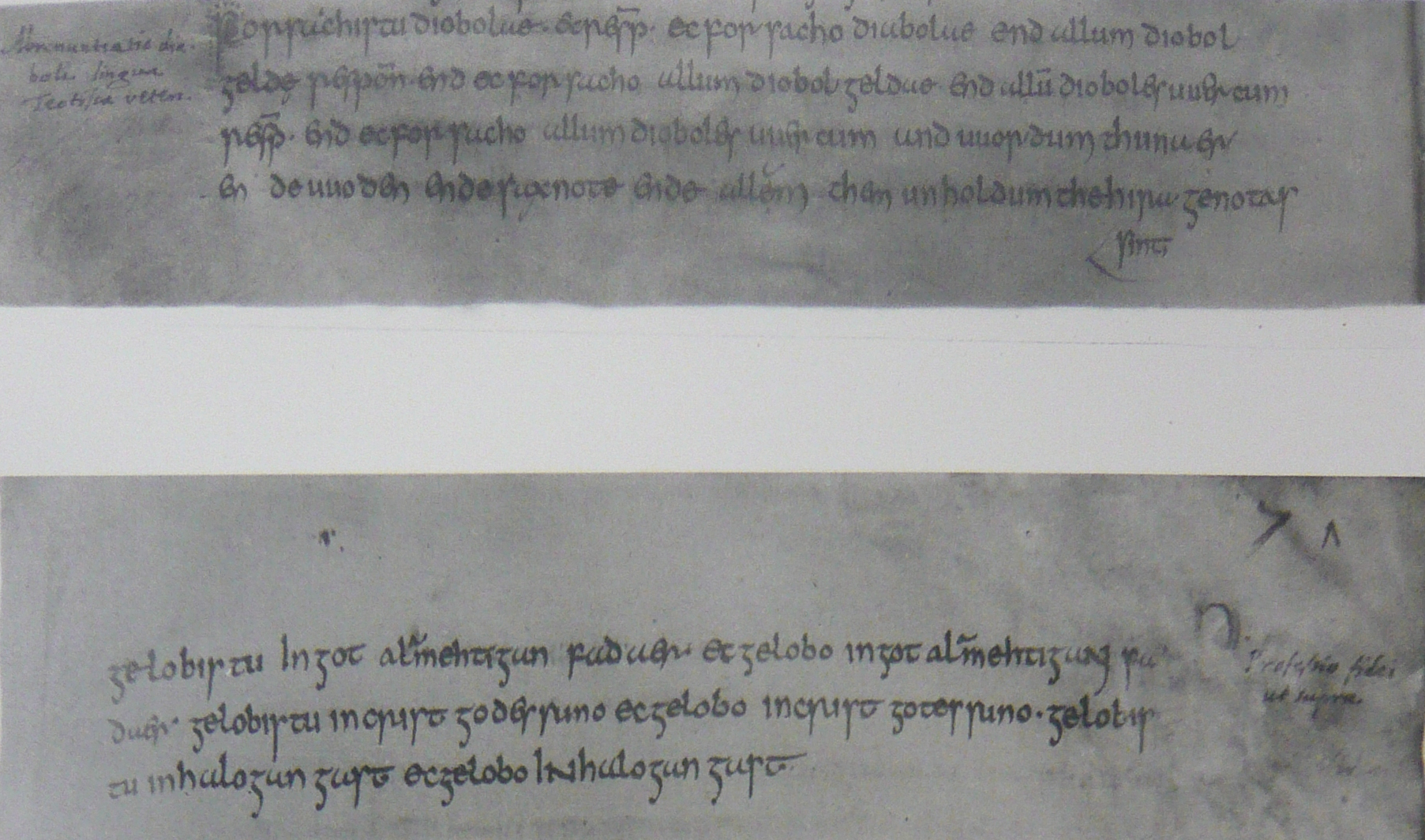
The Utrecht baptismal vow

Attestations of Old Dutch sentences are extremely rare. The language is mostly recorded on fragmentary relics, and words have been reconstructed from Middle Dutch and loan words from Old Dutch in other languages. The oldest recorded is found in the Salic law. In this Frankish document written around 510 the oldest Dutch sentence has been identified: Maltho thi afrio lito ("I say to you, I free you, serf") used to free a serf. Another old fragment of Dutch is Visc flot aftar themo uuatare ("A fish was swimming in the water"). The oldest conserved larger Dutch text is the Utrecht baptismal vow (776–800) starting with Forsachistu diobolae ... ec forsacho diabolae (litt.: "Forsake you the devil? ... I forsake the devil"). If only for its poetic content, the most famous Old Dutch sentence is probably Hebban olla vogala nestas hagunnan, hinase hic enda tu, wat unbidan we nu ("All birds have started making nests, except me and you, what are we waiting for"), is dated to around the year 1100, written by a Flemish monk in a convent in Rochester, England. Since the sentence speaks to the imagination, it is often erroneously stated as the oldest Dutch sentence.

=== Middle Dutch (12th–15th centuries) ===
Old Dutch naturally evolved into Middle Dutch. The year 1150 is often chosen as the time of the transition, but it actually marks a time of profuse Dutch writing; during this period a rich Medieval Dutch literature developed. There was at that time no overarching standard language; Middle Dutch is rather a collective name for a number of closely related, mutually intelligible dialects spoken in the former Old Dutch area. Where Old Dutch fragments are very hard to read for untrained Modern Dutch speakers, the various literary works of Middle Dutch are somewhat more accessible. The most notable difference between Old and Middle Dutch is in a feature of speech known as vowel reduction, whereby vowels in unstressed syllables are leveled to a schwa.

The Middle Dutch dialect areas were affected by political boundaries. The sphere of political influence of a certain ruler often also created a sphere of linguistic influence, with the language within the area becoming more homogenous. Following the contemporary political divisions they are in order of importance:

- West Flemish with the County of Flanders at its centre. It had been influential during the earlier Middle Ages (the "Flemish expansion") but lost prestige to the neighbouring Brabantian in the 13th century.
- Brabantian (and related East Flemish), spoken primarily in the Duchy of Brabant and adjacent parts. It was an influential dialect during most of the Middle Ages, during the so-called "Brabantian expansion" in which the influence of Brabant was extended outwards into other areas.
- Hollandic, which had the County of Holland as its heartland, where originally Old Frisian was spoken. The people adopted Low Franconian and a new Frankish dialect with a Frisian substrate developed. It was less influential during most of the Middle Ages but became more so in the 16th century during the "Hollandic expansion"; the Eighty Years' War took place in the Southern Netherlands during this period.
- Limburgish, spoken by the people in the modern-day provinces of Dutch and Belgian Limburg, and adjacent lands in Germany. It was over time tied to different political areas and is therefore the most divergent of the dialects. It was even partly influenced by the High German consonant shift and is the most distant to the later developed standard language to which it contributed little. It was, however, the earliest Middle Dutch dialect that developed a literary tradition.
- Since it is part of the Old Saxon and not Low Franconian (Old Dutch) area, Dutch Low Saxon is not strictly a Dutch dialect. However, it was influenced by Middle Dutch since the 14th century and it did play a part in the formation of the standard Dutch language in later periods. It was spoken in the Oversticht territories of the episcopal principality of Utrecht and adjacent parts of Guelders. A dialect continuum remained present with Low Franconian areas to the west and Low Saxon areas to the east.

=== Modern Dutch (15th century–present) ===
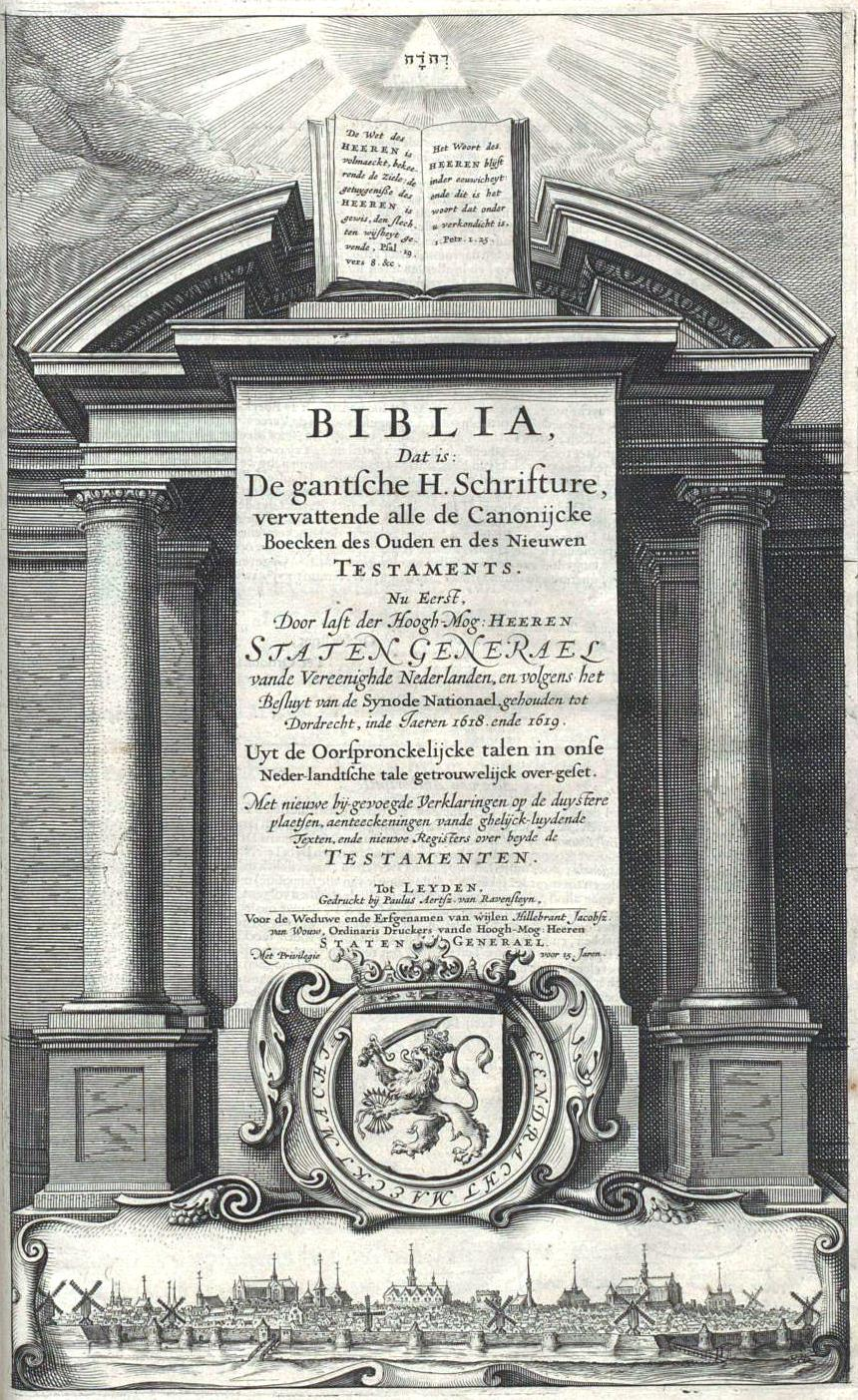
Title page of the Statenvertaling (1637) reads: Biblia ... Uyt de Oorspronckelijcke talen in onse Neder-landtsche tale getrouwelijck over-geset. (English: From the Original languages into our Dutch language faithfully translated.)

A process of standardisation started in the Middle Ages, especially under the influence of the Burgundian Ducal Court in Dijon (Brussels after 1477). The dialects of Flanders and Brabant were the most influential around this time. The process of standardisation became much stronger at the start of the 16th century, mainly based on the urban dialect of Antwerp. The 1585 fall of Antwerp to the Spanish army led to a flight to the northern Netherlands, where the Dutch Republic declared its independence from Spain. This influenced the urban dialects of the province of Holland. In 1637, a further important step was made towards a unified language, when the Statenvertaling, the first major Bible translation into Dutch, was created that people from all over the new republic could understand. It used elements from various, even Dutch Low Saxon, dialects but was predominantly based on the urban dialects of Holland of post 16th century.

In the Southern Netherlands (now Belgium and Luxembourg), developments were different. Under subsequent Spanish, Austrian and French rule, the standardisation of Dutch language came to a standstill. The state, law, and increasingly education used French, yet more than half the Belgian population were speaking a variety of Dutch. In the course of the 19th century, the Flemish Movement stood up for the rights of Dutch speakers, mostly referred to as "Flemish". However, the dialect variation was a serious disadvantage in the face of the standardised francophony. Since standardisation is a lengthy process, Dutch-speaking Belgium associated itself with the standard language that had already developed in the Netherlands over the centuries. Therefore, the situation in Belgium is essentially no different from that in the Netherlands, although there are recognisable differences in pronunciation, comparable to the pronunciation differences between standard British and standard American English. In 1980 the Netherlands and Belgium concluded the Language Union Treaty. This treaty lays down the principle that the two countries must gear their language policy to each other, among other things, for a common system of spelling.

== Classification ==
- Indo-European languages
  - Germanic
    - West Germanic
      - Low Franconian
        - Dutch
          - Afrikaans, Dutch-based creoles

Dutch belongs to its own West Germanic sub-group, the Low Franconian languages, paired with its sister language Limburgish or East Low Franconian. Its closest relative is the mutually intelligible daughter language Afrikaans. Other West Germanic languages related to Dutch are German, English and the un-standardised languages Low German and Yiddish.

Dutch stands out in combining some Ingvaeonic characteristics (occurring consistently in English and Frisian and reduced in intensity from west to east over the continental West Germanic plane) with dominant Istvaeonic characteristics, some of which are also incorporated in German. Unlike German, Dutch (apart from Limburgish) has not been influenced at all by the south to north movement of the High German consonant shift and had some changes of its own. (Note: Friedrich Maurer uses the term Istvaeonic instead of Franconian; see Friedrich Maurer (1942), Nordgermanen und Alemannen: Studien zur germanischen und frühdeutschen Sprachgeschichte, Stammes- und Volkskunde, Bern: Verlag Francke.) The cumulation of these changes resulted over time in separate, but related standard languages with various degrees of similarities and differences between them. For a comparison between the West Germanic languages, see the sections Phonology, Grammar, and Vocabulary.

== Dialects ==
Dutch dialects are primarily the dialects that are both related with the Dutch language and are spoken in the same language area as the Dutch standard language. Although heavily under the influence of the standard language, some of them remain diverse and are found in the Netherlands and in the Brussels and Flemish regions of Belgium. The areas in which they are spoken often correspond with former medieval counties and duchies. The Netherlands (but not Belgium) distinguishes between a dialect and a streektaal ("regional language"). Those words are actually more political than linguistic because a regional language unites a large group of very different varieties. Such is the case with the Gronings dialect, which is considered a variety of the Dutch Low Saxon regional language, but it is relatively distinct from other Dutch Low Saxon varieties. Also, some Dutch dialects are more remote from the Dutch standard language than some varieties of a regional language are. Within the Netherlands, a further distinction is made between a regional language and a separate language, which is the case with the (standardised) West Frisian language. It is spoken alongside Dutch in the province of Friesland.

Dutch dialects and regional languages are not spoken as often as they used to be, especially in the Netherlands. Recent research by Geert Driessen shows that the use of dialects and regional languages among both Dutch adults and youth is in heavy decline. In 1995, 27 percent of the Dutch adult population spoke a dialect or regional language on a regular basis, but in 2011, that was no more than 11 percent. In 1995, 12 percent of children of primary school age spoke a dialect or regional language, but in 2011, that had declined to four percent. Of the officially recognised regional languages Limburgish is spoken the most (in 2011 among adults 54%, among children 31%) and Dutch Low Saxon the least (adults 15%, children 1%). The decline of the West Frisian language in Friesland occupies a middle position (adults 44%, children 22%). Dialects are most often spoken in rural areas, but many cities have a distinct city dialect. For example, the city of Ghent has very distinct "g", "e" and "r" sounds that greatly differ from its surrounding villages. The Brussels dialect combines Brabantian with words adopted from Walloon and French.

Some dialects had, until recently, extensions across the borders of other standard language areas. In most cases, the heavy influence of the standard language has broken the dialect continuum. Examples are the Gronings dialect spoken in Groningen as well as the closely related varieties in adjacent East Frisia (Germany). Kleverlandish is a dialect spoken in southern Gelderland, the northern tip of Limburg, and northeast of North Brabant (Netherlands), but also in adjacent parts of North Rhine-Westphalia (Germany). Limburgish (Limburgs) is spoken in Limburg (Belgium) as well as in the remaining part of Limburg (Netherlands) and extends across the German border. West Flemish (Westvlaams) is spoken in West Flanders, the western part of Zeelandic Flanders and also in French Flanders, where it virtually became extinct to make way for French.

=== Dialect groups ===
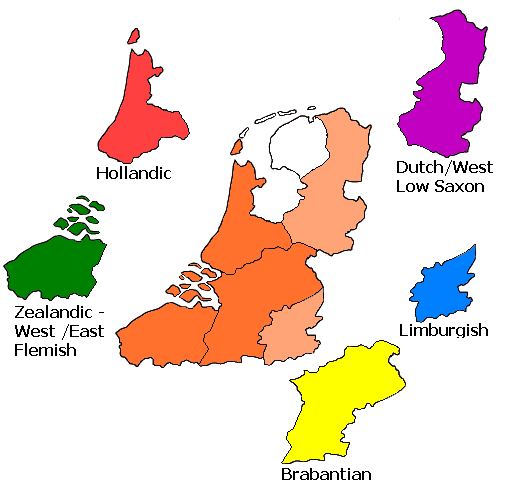
Traditional division of Dutch dialects

The West Flemish group of dialects, spoken in West Flanders and Zeeland, is so distinct that it might be considered as a separate language variant, although the strong significance of language in Belgian politics would prevent the government from classifying them as such. An oddity of the dialect is that, the voiced velar fricative (written as "g" in Dutch) shifts to a voiced glottal fricative (written as "h" in Dutch), while the letter "h" becomes mute (as in French). As a result, when West Flemings try to talk Standard Dutch, they are often unable to pronounce the g-sound, and pronounce it similar to the h-sound. This leaves, for example, no difference between "held" (hero) and "geld" (money). Or in some cases, they are aware of the problem, and hyper-correct the "h" into a voiced velar fricative or g-sound, again leaving no difference. The West Flemish variety historically spoken in adjacent parts in France is sometimes called French Flemish and is listed as a French minority language. However, only a very small and aging minority of the French-Flemish population still speaks and understands West Flemish.

Hollandic is spoken in Holland and Utrecht, though the original forms of this dialect (which were heavily influenced by a West Frisian substratum and, from the 16th century on, by Brabantian dialects) are now relatively rare. The urban dialects of the Randstad, which are Hollandic dialects, do not diverge from standard Dutch very much, but there is a clear difference between the city dialects of Rotterdam, The Hague, Amsterdam and Utrecht. In some rural Hollandic areas more authentic Hollandic dialects are still being used, especially north of Amsterdam. Another group of dialects based on Hollandic is that spoken in the cities and larger towns of Friesland, where it partially displaced West Frisian in the 16th century and is known as Stadsfries ("Urban Frisian"). Hollandic together with inter alia Kleverlandish and North Brabantian, but without Stadsfries, are the Central Dutch dialects.

Brabantian is named after the historical Duchy of Brabant, which corresponded mainly to the provinces of North Brabant and southern Gelderland, the Belgian provinces of Antwerp and Flemish Brabant, as well as Brussels (where its native speakers have become a minority) and the province of Walloon Brabant. Brabantian expands into small parts in the west of Limburg while its strong influence on the East Flemish of East Flanders and eastern Zeelandic Flanders weakens towards the west. In a small area in the northwest of North Brabant (Willemstad), Hollandic is spoken. Conventionally, the Kleverlandish dialects are distinguished from Brabantian, but there are no objective criteria apart from geography to do so. Over 5 million people live in an area with some form of Brabantian being the predominant colloquial language out of the area's 22 million Dutch-speakers.

Limburgish, spoken in both Belgian Limburg and Netherlands Limburg and in adjacent parts in Germany, is considered a dialect in Belgium, while having obtained the official status of regional language in the Netherlands. Limburgish has been influenced by the Ripuarian varieties like the Colognian dialect, and has had a somewhat different development since the late Middle Ages.

=== Regional languages ===
Two dialect groups have been given the official status of regional language (or streektaal) in the Netherlands. Like several other dialect groups, both are part of a dialect continuum that continues across the national border.

==== Dutch Low Saxon ====
The Dutch Low Saxon dialect area comprises the provinces of Groningen, Drenthe and Overijssel, as well as parts of the provinces of Gelderland, Flevoland, Friesland and Utrecht. This group, which is not Low Franconian but instead Low Saxon and close to neighbouring Low German, has been elevated by the Netherlands (and by Germany) to the legal status of streektaal (regional language) according to the European Charter for Regional or Minority Languages. By some it is regarded as Dutch for a number of reasons. From the 14th to 15th century onward, its urban centers (Deventer, Zwolle, Kampen, Zutphen and Doesburg) have been increasingly influenced by the western written Dutch and became a linguistically mixed area. From the 17th century onward, it was gradually integrated into the Dutch language area. Dutch Low Saxon used to be at one end of the Low German dialect continuum. However, the national border has given way to dialect boundaries coinciding with a political border, because the traditional dialects are strongly influenced by the national standard varieties.

==== Limburgish ====
While a somewhat heterogeneous group of Low Franconian dialects, Limburgish has received official status as a regional language in the Netherlands, but not in Belgium. Due to this official recognition, it receives protection by chapter 2 of the European Charter for Regional or Minority Languages.

=== Daughter and sister languages ===
Afrikaans, although to a significant degree mutually intelligible with Dutch, is usually not considered a dialect but instead a separate standardised language. It is spoken in South Africa and Namibia. As a daughter language of 17th-century Dutch dialects, Afrikaans evolved in parallel with modern Dutch, but was influenced by various other languages in South Africa.

West Frisian (Westerlauwers Fries), along with Saterland Frisian and North Frisian, evolved from the same branch of the West Germanic languages as Old English (i.e. Anglo-Frisian) and are therefore genetically more closely related to English and Scots than to Dutch. The different influences on the respective languages, however, particularly that of Norman French on English and Dutch on West Frisian, have rendered English quite distinct from West Frisian, and West Frisian less distinct from Dutch than from English. Although under heavy influence of the Dutch standard language, it is not mutually intelligible with Dutch and considered a sister language of Dutch, like English and German.

== Geographic distribution ==
Approximate distribution of native Dutch speakers worldwide:
1. Netherlands (70.8%)
2. Belgium (27.1%)
3. Suriname (1.70%)
4. Caribbean (0.10%)
5. Other (0.30%)

Dutch First Language Speakers
Country	Speakers	Year
Netherlands	17,000,000	2020
Belgium	6,500,000	2020
Suriname	400,000	2020
Curaçao	12,000	2011
Aruba	6,000	2010
Caribbean Netherlands	3,000	2018
Sint Maarten	1,500	2011
Total worldwide	24,000,000	N/A

Dutch is an official language of the Netherlands proper (not enshrined in the constitution but in administrative law (Note: The Dutch language does have the status of official language in the Netherlands, together with the Dutch Sign Language and West-Frisian (in Friesland). However, it is not legally enshrined in the Dutch constitution, which is uncommon in the European Union. There is almost no legally defined status of Dutch stipulated anywhere in legislation. A long series of parliamentary and public discussions in the 2010s on the question whether to enshrine Dutch as the official language of the Netherlands came to nothing, and the proposal was withdrawn again by the government in February 2018.)), Belgium, Suriname, the Dutch Caribbean municipalities (St. Eustatius, Saba and Bonaire), Aruba, Curaçao and Sint Maarten. Dutch is also an official language of several international organisations, such as the European Union, Union of South American Nations and the Caribbean Community. At an academic level, Dutch is taught in about 175 universities in 40 countries. About 15,000 students worldwide study Dutch at university.

=== Europe ===
In Europe, Dutch is the majority language in the Netherlands (96%) and Belgium (59%) as well as a minority language in Germany and northern France's French Flanders. Though Belgium as a whole is multilingual, three of the four language areas into which the country is divided (Flanders, francophone Wallonia, and the German-speaking Community) are largely monolingual, with Brussels being bilingual. The Netherlands and Belgium produce the vast majority of music, films, books and other media written or spoken in Dutch. Dutch is a monocentric language, at least what concerns its written form, with all speakers using the same standard form (authorised by the Dutch Language Union) based on a Dutch orthography defined in the so-called "Green Booklet" authoritative dictionary and employing the Latin alphabet when writing; however, pronunciation varies between dialects. Indeed, in stark contrast to its written uniformity, Dutch lacks a unique prestige dialect and has a large dialectal continuum consisting of 28 main dialects, which can themselves be further divided into at least 600 distinguishable varieties. In the Netherlands, the Hollandic dialect dominates in national broadcast media while in Flanders Brabantian dialect dominates in that capacity, making them in turn unofficial prestige dialects in their respective countries.

Outside the Netherlands and Belgium, the dialect spoken in and around the German town of Kleve (Kleverlandish) is historically and genetically a Low Franconian variety. In North-Western France, the area around Calais was historically Dutch-speaking (West Flemish), of which an estimated 20,000 are daily speakers. The cities of Dunkirk, Gravelines and Bourbourg only became predominantly French-speaking by the end of the 19th century. In the countryside, until World War I, many elementary schools continued to teach in Dutch, and the Catholic Church continued to preach and teach the catechism in Dutch in many parishes.

During the second half of the 19th century, Dutch was banned from all levels of education by both Prussia and France and lost most of its functions as a cultural language. In both Germany and France, the Dutch standard language is largely absent, and speakers of these Dutch dialects will use German or French in everyday speech. Dutch is not afforded legal status in France or Germany, either by the central or regional public authorities, and knowledge of the language is declining among younger generations.

As a foreign language, Dutch is mainly taught in primary and secondary schools in areas adjacent to the Netherlands and Flanders. In French-speaking Belgium, over 300,000 pupils are enrolled in Dutch courses, followed by over 23,000 in the German states of Lower Saxony and North Rhine-Westphalia, and about 7,000 in the French region of Nord-Pas-de-Calais (of which 4,550 are in primary school). At an academic level, the largest number of faculties of neerlandistiek can be found in Germany (30 universities), followed by France (20 universities) and the United Kingdom (5 universities).

=== Asia ===
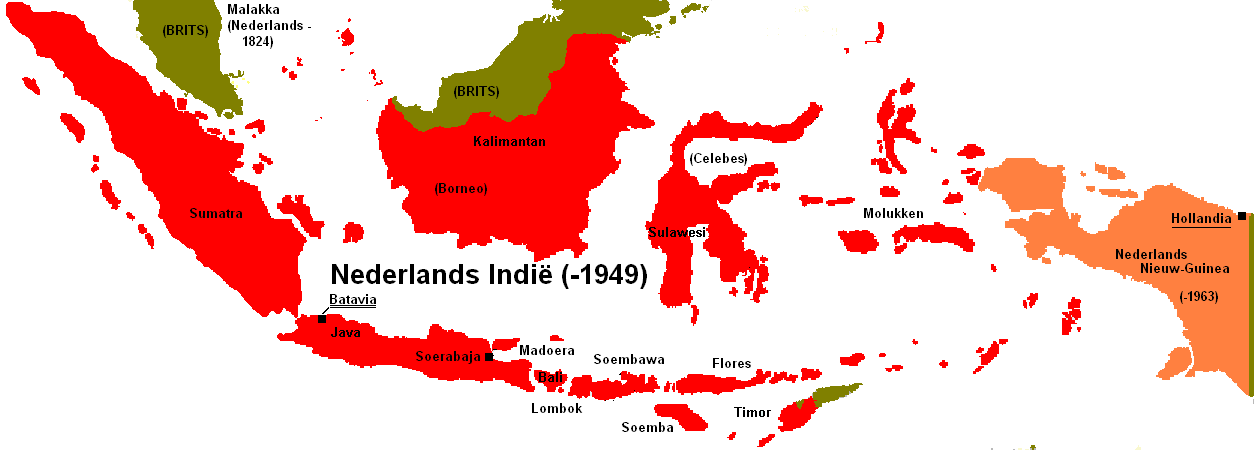
In the Dutch East Indies (present day Indonesia and Malacca, Malaysia), Dutch was used by only a limited educated elite.

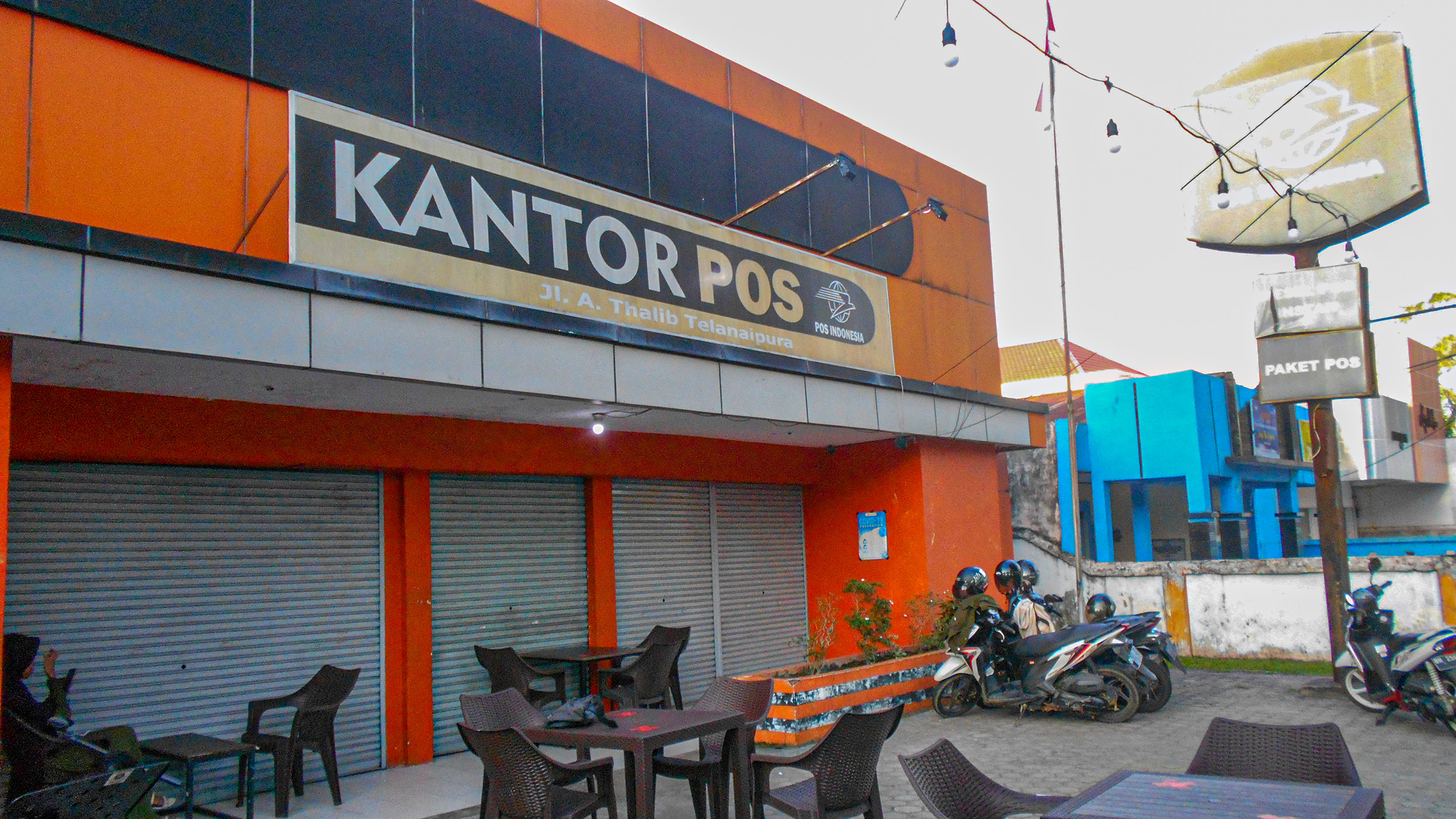
Indonesia did not adopt the Dutch language after independence. However, the Indonesian language is heavily influenced by Dutch. Seen here is kantor pos (from the Dutch postkantoor), meaning post office.

Despite the Dutch presence in Indonesia for almost 350 years, as the Asian bulk of the Dutch East Indies, the Dutch language has no official status there and the small minority that can speak the language fluently are either educated members of the oldest generation, or employed in the legal profession such as historians, diplomats, lawyers, jurists and linguists/polyglots, as certain law codes are still available only in Dutch. Dutch is taught in various educational centres in Indonesia, the most important of which is the Erasmus Language Centre (ETC) in Jakarta. Each year, some 1,500 to 2,000 students take Dutch courses there. In total, several thousand Indonesians study Dutch as a foreign language. Owing to centuries of Dutch rule in Indonesia, many old documents are written in Dutch. Many universities therefore include Dutch as a source language, mainly for law and history students. In Indonesia this involves about 35,000 students.

Unlike other European nations, the Dutch chose not to follow a policy of language expansion amongst the indigenous peoples of their colonies. In the last quarter of the 19th century, however, a local elite gained proficiency in Dutch so as to meet the needs of expanding bureaucracy and business. Nevertheless, the Dutch government remained reluctant to teach Dutch on a large scale for fear of destabilising the colony. Dutch, the language of power, was supposed to remain in the hands of the leading elite.

After independence, Dutch was dropped as an official language and replaced by Indonesian, but this does not mean that Dutch has completely disappeared in Indonesia: Indonesian Dutch, a regional variety of the Dutch, was still spoken by about 500,000 half-blood in Indonesia in 1985. Yet the Indonesian language inherited many words from Dutch: words for everyday life as well as scientific and technological terms. One scholar argues that 20% of Indonesian words can be traced back to Dutch words, many of which are transliterated to reflect phonetic pronunciation e.g. kantoor "office" in Indonesian is kantor, handdoek "towel" in Indonesian is handuk, or bushalte "bus stop" in Indonesian is halte bus. In addition, many Indonesian words are calques of Dutch; for example, rumah sakit "hospital" is calqued on the Dutch ziekenhuis (literally "sickhouse"), kebun binatang "zoo" on dierentuin (literally "animal garden"), undang-undang dasar "constitution" from grondwet (literally "ground law"). These account for some of the differences in vocabulary between Indonesian and Malay. Some regional languages in Indonesia have some Dutch loanwords as well; for example, Sundanese word Katel or "frying pan" origin in Dutch is "ketel". The Javanese word for "bike/bicycle" "pit" can be traced back to its origin in Dutch "fiets". The Malacca state of Malaysia was also colonized by the Dutch in its longest period that Malacca was under foreign control. In the 19th century, the East Indies trade started to dwindle, and with it the importance of Malacca as a trading post. The Dutch state officially ceded Malacca to the British in 1825. It took until 1957 for Malaya to gain its independence. Despite this, the Dutch language is rarely spoken in Malacca or Malaysia and only limited to foreign nationals able to speak the language.

=== Oceania ===
After the declaration of independence of Indonesia, Western New Guinea, the "wild east" of the Dutch East Indies, remained a Dutch colony until 1962, known as Netherlands New Guinea. Despite prolonged Dutch presence, the Dutch language is not spoken by many Papuans, the colony having been ceded to Indonesia in 1963.

Dutch-speaking immigrant communities can also be found in Australia and New Zealand. The 2011 Australian census showed 37,248 people speaking Dutch at home. At the 2006 New Zealand census, 26,982 people, or 0.70 percent of the total population, reported to speak Dutch to sufficient fluency that they could hold an everyday conversation.

=== Americas ===
The location of Suriname in South America

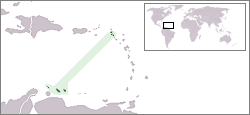
The Dutch Caribbean at both ends of the Lesser Antilles, lining the Caribbean Sea

In contrast to the colonies in the East Indies, from the second half of the 19th century onwards, the Netherlands envisaged the expansion of Dutch in its colonies in the West Indies. Until 1863, when slavery was abolished in the West Indies, slaves were forbidden to speak Dutch, with the effect that local creoles such as Papiamento and Sranan Tongo which were based not on Dutch but rather other European languages, became common in the Dutch West Indies. However, as most of the people in the Colony of Surinam (now Suriname) worked on Dutch plantations, this reinforced the use of Dutch as a means for direct communication.

In Suriname today, Dutch is the sole official language, and over 60 percent of the population speaks it as a mother tongue. Dutch is the obligatory medium of instruction in schools in Suriname, even for non-native speakers. A further twenty-four percent of the population speaks Dutch as a second language. Suriname gained its independence from the Netherlands in 1975 and has been an associate member of the Dutch Language Union since 2004. The lingua franca of Suriname, however, is Sranan Tongo, spoken natively by about a fifth of the population. (Note: Recognition of Surinamese-Dutch (Surinaams-Nederlands) as an equal natiolect was expressed in 1976 by the publication of the Woordenboek van het Surinaams-Nederlands – een geannoteerde lijst van Surinaams-Nederlandse woorden en uitdrukkingen (Dictionary of Surinam Dutch – an annotated list of Surinam-Dutch words and expressions), see Johannes van Donselaar Woordenboek van het Surinaams-Nederlands – een geannoteerde lijst van Surinaams-Nederlandse woorden en uitdrukkingen, Utrecht : Instituut A. W. de Groot voor Algemene Taalwetenschap van de Rijksuniversiteit te Utrecht (1976), Amsterdam, E.T.Rap (1977) ISBN 90-6005-125-4, published in 1989 as the Woordenboek van het Surinaams-Nederlands (Dictionary of Surinam Dutch), by Van Donselaar, and later by the publication of the Woordenboek Surinaams Nederlands (Dictionary Surinam Dutch) in 2009 (editor Renata de Bies, in cooperation with lexicologists Willy Martin en Willy Smedts), which was previously published as the Woordenboek van de Surinaamse Bijdrage aan het Nederlands (Dictionary of the Surinam Contribution to Dutch").)

Dutch is official on all 6 Dutch Caribbean islands (Aruba, Bonaire, Curaçao, Sint Maarten, Saba and Sint Eustatius), but is not commonly spoken on any of the islands. Dutch is spoken as a first language by only 7% to 8% of the population, although most people on the Dutch Caribbean islands can speak Dutch to varying degrees of fluency as the education system is in Dutch at some or all levels.

Now-extinct Dutch-based creole languages were formerly spoken in the Virgin Islands and Guyana (Negerhollands, Berbice Dutch creole, Skepi Dutch creole).

In the United States, a now extinct dialect of Dutch, Jersey Dutch, spoken by descendants of 17th-century Dutch settlers in Bergen and Passaic counties, was still spoken as late as 1921. Other Dutch-based creole languages once spoken in the Americas include Mohawk Dutch (in Albany, New York), Berbice (in Guyana), Skepi (in Essequibo, Guyana) and Negerhollands (in the United States Virgin Islands). Pennsylvania Dutch is not a member of the set of Dutch dialects and is less misleadingly called Pennsylvania German.

Martin Van Buren, the eighth President of the United States, spoke Dutch natively and is the only U.S. president whose first language was not English. Dutch prevailed for many generations as the dominant language in parts of New York along the Hudson River. Another famous American born in this region who spoke Dutch as a first language was Sojourner Truth.

According to the 2000 United States census, 150,396 people spoke Dutch at home, while according to the 2006 Canadian census, this number reaches 160,000 Dutch speakers. At an academic level, 20 universities offer Dutch studies in the United States. In Canada, Dutch is the fourth most spoken language by farmers, after English, French and German, and the fifth most spoken non-official language overall (by 0.6% of Canadians).

=== Africa ===
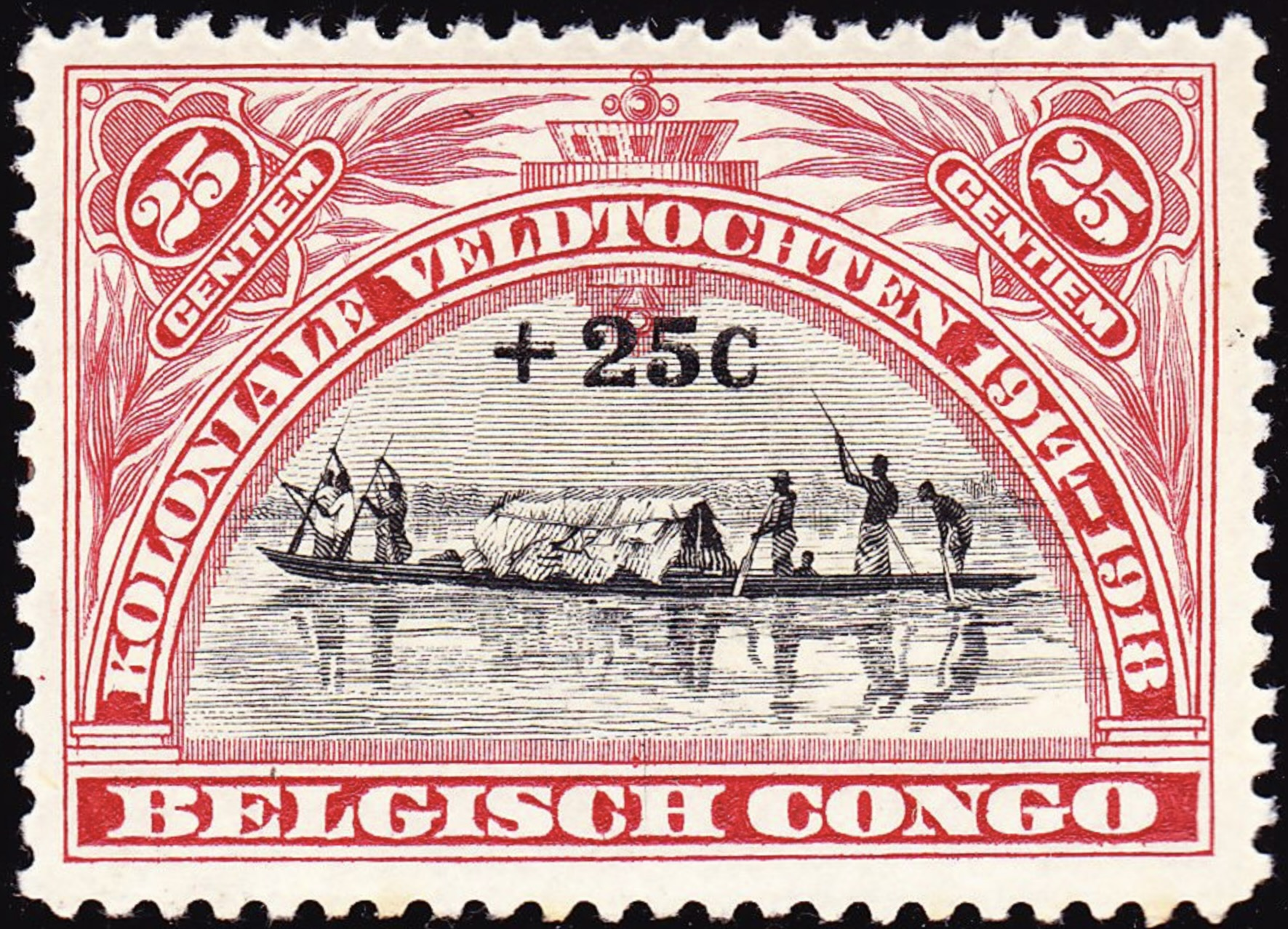
Dutch-language variant of a Belgian Congo postage stamp showing colonial expeditions

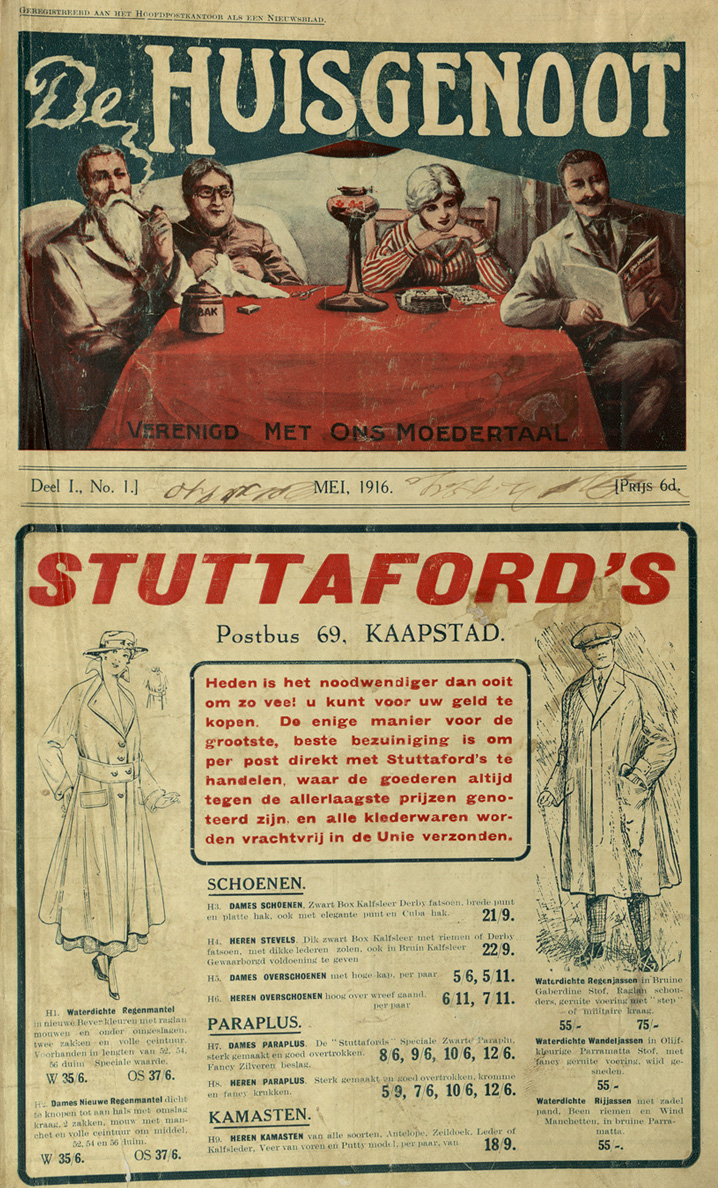
Standard Dutch used in a 1916 ad in South Africa before Afrikaans replaced Dutch for use in media

The distribution of Afrikaans across South Africa: proportion of the population speaking Afrikaans at home: 0–20%; 20–40%; 40–60%; 60–80%; 80–100%

The largest legacy of the Dutch language lies in South Africa, which attracted large numbers of Dutch, Flemish and other northwest European farmer (in Dutch, boer) settlers, all of whom were quickly assimilated. The long isolation from the rest of the Dutch-speaking world made the Dutch as spoken in Southern Africa evolve into what is now Afrikaans. In 1876, the first Afrikaans newspaper called Die Afrikaanse Patriot was published in the Cape Colony.

European Dutch remained the literary language until the start of the 1920s, when under pressure of Afrikaner nationalism the local "African" Dutch was preferred over the written, European-based standard. In 1925, section 137 of the 1909 constitution of the Union of South Africa was amended by Act 8 of 1925, stating "the word Dutch in article 137 ... is hereby declared to include Afrikaans". The constitution of 1983 only listed English and Afrikaans as official languages. It is estimated that between 90% and 95% of Afrikaans vocabulary is ultimately of Dutch origin.

Both languages are still largely mutually intelligible, although this relation can in some fields (such as lexicon, spelling and grammar) be asymmetric, as it is easier for Dutch speakers to understand written Afrikaans than it is for Afrikaans speakers to understand written Dutch. Afrikaans is grammatically far less complex than Dutch, and vocabulary items are generally altered in a clearly patterned manner, e.g. vogel becomes voël ("bird") and regen becomes reën ("rain"). In South Africa, the number of students following Dutch at university is difficult to estimate, since the academic study of Afrikaans inevitably includes the study of Dutch. Elsewhere in the world, the number of people learning Dutch is relatively small.

Afrikaans is the third largest language of South Africa in terms of native speakers (~13.5%), of whom 53% are Coloureds and 42.4% Whites. In 1996, 40 percent of South Africans reported to know Afrikaans at least at a very basic level of communication. It is the lingua franca in Namibia, where it is spoken natively in 11 percent of households. In total, Afrikaans is the first language in South Africa alone of about 7.1 million people and is estimated to be a second language for at least 10 million people worldwide, compared to over 23 million and 5 million respectively, for Dutch.

The Dutch colonial presence elsewhere in Africa, notably the Dutch Gold Coast, was too ephemeral not to be wiped out by prevailing colonising European successors. Likewise, the Belgian colonial presence in the Congo and Ruanda-Urundi (Rwanda and Burundi held under a League of Nations mandate and later a UN trust territory) left little Dutch (Flemish) legacy, as French was the main colonial language.

== Phonology ==
Spoken Dutch, with a Netherlands (Brabantian) accent

Spoken Standard Dutch, with a West Flemish accent

For further details on different realisations of phonemes, dialectal differences and example words, see the full article at Dutch phonology.

=== Consonants ===
Unlike other Germanic languages, Dutch has no phonological aspiration of consonants. Like most other Germanic languages, the Dutch consonant system did not undergo the High German consonant shift and has a syllable structure that allows fairly-complex consonant clusters. Dutch also retains full use of the velar fricatives of Proto-Germanic that were lost or modified in many other Germanic languages. Dutch has final-obstruent devoicing. At the end of a word, voicing distinction is neutralised and all obstruents are pronounced voiceless. For example, Dutch goede (̇'good') is [ˈɣudə] but the related form goed is [ɣut]. Dutch shares this final-obstruent devoicing with German (the Dutch noun goud is pronounced [ɣɑut], the adjective gouden is pronounced [ɣɑudə(n)], like the German noun Gold, pronounced [ɡɔlt], adjective golden, pronounced [ɡɔldn] vs English gold and golden, both pronounced with [d].)

Voicing of pre-vocalic initial voiceless alveolar fricatives occurs in standard Dutch like in German (Dutch zeven, German sieben with [z] versus English seven, Low Saxon seven with [s]), and also the shift /θ/ → /d/. Dutch shares only with Low German the development of /xs/ → /ss/ (Dutch vossen, ossen and Low German Vösse, Ossen versus German Füchse, Ochsen and English foxes, oxen), and also the development of /ft/ → /xt/ though it is far more common in Dutch (Dutch zacht and Low German sacht versus German sanft and English soft, but Dutch kracht versus Low German/German Kraft and English craft).

		Labial	Coronal	Dorsal	Glottal
Nasal		m	n	ŋ	
Plosive	voiceless	p	t	k	
Plosive	voiced	b	d	(ɡ)	
Fricative	voiceless	f	s	x	ɦ
Fricative	voiced	v	z	ɣ	ɦ
Approximant		ʋ	l	j	
Rhotic			r		

Notes:

- [ʔ] is not a separate phoneme in Dutch, but is inserted before vowel-initial syllables within words after /a/ and /ə/ and often also at the beginning of a word.
- The realisation of the /r/ phoneme varies considerably from dialect to dialect and even between speakers in the same dialect area. Common realisations are an alveolar trill [r], alveolar tap [ɾ], uvular trill [ʀ], voiced uvular approximant [ʁ̞], and alveolar approximant [ɹ].
- The realisation of /ʋ/ also varies somewhat by area and speaker. The main realisation is a labiodental approximant [ʋ], but some speakers, particularly in the south, use a bilabial approximant [β̞] or a labiovelar approximant [w].
- The lateral /l/ is slightly velarised postvocalically in most dialects, particularly in the north.
- /x/ and /ɣ/ may be true velars [x] and [ɣ], uvular [χ] and [ʁ] or palatal [ç] and [ʝ]. The more palatal realisations are common in southern areas, and uvulars are common in the north.
- Some northern dialects have a tendency to devoice all fricatives, regardless of environment, which is particularly common with /ɣ/ but can affect others as well.
- /ɕ/, /ʑ/, /tɕ/, and /dʑ/ are not native phonemes of Dutch and usually occur in borrowed words, like show and bagage ('baggage'), but may occur if /s/, /z/, /t/, and /d/ are palatalised.
- /ɡ/ is not a native phoneme of Dutch and occurs only in borrowed words, like baguette.

=== Vowels ===
Like English, Dutch did not develop i-mutation as a morphological marker and shares with most other Germanic languages the lengthening of short vowels in stressed open syllables, which has led to contrastive vowel length being used as a morphological marker. Dutch has an extensive vowel inventory. Vowels can be grouped as back rounded, front unrounded and front rounded. They are also traditionally distinguished by length or tenseness.

Vowel length is not always considered a distinctive feature in Dutch phonology because it normally occurs with changes in vowel quality. One feature or the other may be considered redundant, and some phonemic analyses prefer to treat it as an opposition of tenseness. However, even if it is not considered part of the phonemic opposition, the long/tense vowels are still realised as phonetically longer than their short counterparts. The changes in vowel quality are also not always the same in all dialects, some of which may be little difference at all, with length remaining the primary distinguishing feature. Although all older words pair vowel length with a change in vowel quality, new loanwords have reintroduced phonemic oppositions of length. Compare zonne(n) [ˈzɔnə] ("suns") versus zone [ˈzɔːnə] ("zone") versus zonen [ˈzoːnə(n)] ("sons"), or kroes [krus] ("mug") versus cruise [kruːs] ("cruise").

Monophthongs
	Front				Central		Back	
	unrounded		rounded		Central		Back	
	lax	tense	lax	tense	lax	tense	lax	tense
Close	ɪ	i ~ iː	ʏ	y ~ yː				u ~ uː
Close-mid	ɪ	eː	ʏ	øː	ə			oː
Open-mid	ɛ	(ɛː)		(œː)	ə		ɔ	(ɔː)
Open						aː	ɑ	

Notes:

- The distinction between /i y u/ and /iː yː uː/ is only slight and may be considered allophonic for most purposes. However, some recent loanwords have introduced distinctively-long /iː yː uː/, making the length distinction marginally phonemic.
- The long close-mid vowels /eː øː oː/ are realised as slightly closing diphthongs [ei øy ou] in many northern dialects.
- The long open-mid vowels /ɛː œː ɔː/ occur only in a handful of loanwords, mostly from French. In certain Belgian Dutch varieties, they may also occur as realisations of /ɛi œy ɔu/.
- The long close and close-mid vowels are often pronounced more closed or as centering diphthongs before an /r/ in the syllable coda, which may occur before coda /l/ as well.

=== Diphthongs ===
Unique to the development of Dutch is the collapse of older ol/ul/al + dental into ol + dental, followed by vocalisation of pre-consonantal /l/ and after a short vowel. This sound shift created the diphthong /ɑu/: Dutch goud, zout and bout corresponds with Low German Gold, Solt, Bolt; German Gold, Salz, Balt and English gold, salt, bolt. It is the most common diphthong, along with /ɛi œy/. All three are the only diphthongs commonly considered unique phonemes in Dutch. The tendency for native English speakers is to pronounce Dutch names with /ɛi/ (written as ij or ei) as /aɪ/, (like the English "long i") does not normally lead to confusion for native listeners, since in a number of dialects (such as in Amsterdam), the same pronunciation is heard.

In contrast, /ɑi/ and /ɔi/ are rare in Dutch. The "long/tense" diphthongs are indeed realised as proper diphthongs but are generally analysed phonemically as a long/tense vowel, followed by a glide /j/ or /ʋ/. All diphthongs end in a close vowel (/i y u/) and are grouped here by their first element.

Diphthongs
	Front				Back	
	unrounded		rounded		Back	
	lax	tense	lax	tense	lax	tense
Close		iʊ		yʊ		uɪ
Mid	ɛɪ	eːʊ	œʏ		(ɔɪ)	oːɪ
Open		aːɪ			ɑʊ (ɑɪ)	

=== Phonotactics ===
The syllable structure of Dutch is (C)(C)(C)V(C)(C)(C)(C). Many words, as in English, begin with three consonants: straat /straːt/ (street). There are words that end in four consonants: herfst /ɦɛrfst/ (autumn), ergst /ɛrxst/ (worst), interessantst /ɪn.tə.rɛ.sɑntst/ (most interesting), sterkst /stɛrkst/ (strongest), the last three of which are superlative adjectives.

The highest number of consonants in a single cluster is found in the word slechtstschrijvend /ˈslɛxtstˌsxrɛi̯vənt/ (writing worst), with seven consonant phonemes. angstschreeuw /ˈɑŋstsxreːu̯/ (scream in fear) has six in a row.

=== Polder Dutch ===
A notable change in pronunciation has been occurring in younger generations in the Dutch provinces of Utrecht, North and South Holland, which has been dubbed "Polder Dutch" by Jan Stroop. Such speakers pronounce ⟨ij/ei⟩, ⟨ou/au⟩ and ⟨ui⟩, which used to be pronounced respectively as /ɛi/, /ɔu/, and /œy/, as increasingly lowered [ai], [au], and [ay]; respectively. In addition, the same speakers pronounce /eː/, /oː/, and /øː/ as the diphthongs [ɛi], [ɔu], and [œy] respectively, making the change an example of a chain shift.

The change is interesting from a sociolinguistic point of view because it has apparently happened relatively recently, in the 1970s and was pioneered by older well-educated women from the upper middle classes. The lowering of the diphthongs has long been current in many Dutch dialects and is comparable to the English Great Vowel Shift and the diphthongisation of long high vowels in Modern High German, which had centuries earlier reached the state now found in Polder Dutch. Stroop theorises that the lowering of open-mid to open diphthongs is a phonetically "natural" and inevitable development and that Dutch, after it had diphthongised the long high vowels like German and English, "should" have lowered the diphthongs like German and English as well.

Instead, he argues that the development has been artificially frozen in an "intermediate" state by the standardisation of Dutch pronunciation in the 16th century in which lowered diphthongs found in rural dialects were perceived as ugly by the educated classes and were accordingly declared substandard. Now, however, he thinks that the newly-affluent and independent women can afford to let that natural development take place in their speech. Stroop compares the role of Polder Dutch with the urban variety of British English pronunciation called Estuary English.

This change is not taking place in Afrikaans (which instead has diphthongized the mid monophthongs /eː, øː, oː/ to [iə, yə, uə]), nor for Dutch speakers outside Utrecht and Holland.

== Grammar ==
Dutch is grammatically similar to German, particularly in syntax and verb morphology. However, Dutch has undergone considerable simplification of its inflectional system. Grammatical cases have largely disappeared, with case marking in present-day Dutch restricted mainly to pronouns. Remnants of the older case system survive in some fixed expressions and other constructions.

Modern Standard Dutch has two nominal genders: common and neuter. The common gender comprises the historical masculine and feminine genders, which have merged in most varieties, while the neuter gender remains distinct. Common-gender nouns generally take the definite article de, whereas neuter nouns take het. The distinction between masculine and feminine is nevertheless retained in the personal pronoun system and is more clearly maintained in some southern varieties of Dutch, including varieties spoken in Belgium.

Dutch nouns are therefore generally divided into common and neuter gender in modern standard usage, although the traditional three-gender classification remains relevant to the pronoun system and to descriptions of historical and regional varieties. Gender is not morphologically marked on nouns themselves, but is expressed through agreement on associated words, including determiners, adjectives, and pronouns.

Compared with German, Dutch has considerably fewer inflectional endings. Its inflectional system has undergone substantial morphological simplification, although remnants of older inflectional patterns remain in certain forms and constructions.

=== Verbs and tenses ===
When grouped according to their conjugational class, Dutch has four main verb types: weak verbs, strong verbs, irregular verbs and mixed verbs.

Weak verbs are most numerous, constituting about 60% of all verbs. In these, the past tense and past participle are formed with a dental suffix:

- Weak verbs with past in -de
- Weak verbs with past in -te

Strong verbs are the second most numerous verb group. This group is characterised by a vowel alternation of the stem in the past tense and perfect participle. Dutch distinguishes between 7 classes, comprising almost all strong verbs, with some internal variants. Dutch has many 'half strong verbs': these have a weak past tense and a strong participle or a strong past tense and a weak participle. The following table shows the vowel alternations in more detail. It also shows the number of roots (bare verbs) that belong to each class, variants with a prefix are excluded.

Verb class	Verb		Present		Past		Participle		Number of roots
1	kijken	(to watch)	ɛi	kijk	eː	keek	eː	gekeken	58
2a	bieden	(to offer)	i	bied	oː	bood	oː	geboden	17
2b	stuiven	(to gush)	œy	stuif	oː	stoof	oː	gestoven	23
3a	klimmen	(to climb)	ɪ	klim	ɔ	klom	ɔ	geklommen	25
3b	zenden	(to send)	ɛ	zend	ɔ	zond	ɔ	gezonden	18
3 + 7	sterven	(to die)	ɛ	sterf	i	stierf	ɔ	gestorven	6
4	breken	(to break)	eː	breek	ɑ ~ aː	brak ~ braken	oː	gebroken	7
4 irregular	wegen	(to weigh)	eː	weeg	oː	woog	oː	gewogen	3
5	geven	(to give)	eː	geef	ɑ ~ aː	gaf ~ gaven	eː	gegeven	10
5 irregular	zitten	(to sit)	ɪ	zit	ɑ ~ aː	zat ~ zaten	eː	gezeten	3
6	dragen	(to carry)	aː	draag	u	droeg	aː	gedragen	4
7	roepen	(to call)	X	roep	i	riep	X	geroepen	8
7 irregular	vangen	(to catch)	X	vang	ɪ	ving	X	gevangen	3
Half strong past	vragen	(to ask)		vraag		vroeg		gevraagd	3
Half strong perfect	bakken	(to bake)		bak		bakte		gebakken	19
Other	scheppen	(to create)		schep		schiep		geschapen	5

There is an ongoing process of "weakening" of strong verbs. The verb "ervaren" (to experience) used to be strictly a class 6 strong verb, having the past tense "ervoer" and participle "ervaren", but the weak form "ervaarde" for both past tense and participle is currently also in use. Some other verbs that were originally strong such as "raden" (to guess) and "stoten" (to bump), have past tense forms "ried" and "stiet" that are at present far less common than their weakened forms; "raadde" and "stootte". In most examples of such weakened verbs that were originally strong, both their strong and weak formations are deemed correct.

=== Genders and cases ===
As in English, the case system of Dutch and the subjunctive have largely fallen out of use, and the system has generalised the dative over the accusative case for certain pronouns (NL: me, je; EN: me, you; LI: mi, di vs. DE: mich/mir, dich/dir). While standard Dutch has three grammatical genders, this has few consequences and the masculine and feminine gender are usually merged into a common gender in the Netherlands but not in Belgium (EN: none; NL/LI: common and neuter; in Belgium masculine, feminine and neuter is in use).

Modern Dutch has mostly lost its case system. However, certain idioms and expressions continue to include now archaic case declensions. The definite article has just two forms, de and het, more complex than English, which has only the. The use of the older inflected form den in the dative and accusative, as well as use of der in the dative, is restricted to numerous set phrases, surnames and toponyms. But some dialects still use both, particularly "der" is often used instead of "haar" (her).

	Masculine singular	Feminine singular	Neuter singular	Plural (any gender)
Nominative	de	de	het	de
Genitive	van de	van de	van het	van de
Genitive	des	der	des	der

In modern Dutch, the genitive articles des and der in the bottom line are commonly used in idioms. Other usage is typically considered archaic, poetic or stylistic. One must know whether a noun is masculine or feminine to use them correctly. In most circumstances, the preposition van, the middle line, is instead used, followed by the normal article de or het, and in that case it makes no difference whether a word is masculine or feminine. For the idiomatic use of the articles in the genitive, see for example:

- Masculine singular: "des duivels" (lit: "of the devil") (common proverbial meaning: Seething with rage)
- Feminine singular: "het woordenboek der Friese taal" ("the dictionary of the Frisian language")
- Neuter singular: "de vrouw des huizes" ("the lady of the house")
- Plural: de voortgang "der werken" ("the progress of (public) works")

In contemporary usage, the genitive case still occurs a little more often with plurals than with singulars, as the plural article is der for all genders and no special noun inflection must be taken account of. Der is commonly used in order to avoid reduplication of van, e.g. het merendeel der gedichten van de auteur instead of het merendeel van de gedichten van de auteur ("the bulk of the author's poems").

There is also a genitive form for the pronoun die/dat ("that [one], those [ones]"), namely diens for masculine and neuter singulars (occurrences of dier for feminine singular and all plurals are extremely rare). Although usually avoided in common speech, this form can be used instead of possessive pronouns to avoid confusion. Compare:

- Hij vertelde over zijn zoon en zijn vrouw. – He spoke about his son and his (own) wife.
- Hij vertelde over zijn zoon en diens vrouw. – He spoke about his son and the latter's wife.

Analogically, the relative and interrogative pronoun wie ("who") has the genitive forms wiens and wier (corresponding to English whose, but less frequent in use).

Dutch also has a range of fixed expressions that make use of the genitive articles, which can be abbreviated using apostrophes. Common examples include "'s ochtends" (with 's as abbreviation of des; "in the morning") and desnoods (lit: "of the need", translated: "if necessary").

The Dutch written grammar has simplified over the past 100 years: cases are now mainly used for the pronouns, such as ik (I), mij, me (me), mijn (my), wie (who), wiens (whose: masculine or neuter singular), wier (whose: feminine singular; masculine, feminine or neuter plural). Nouns and adjectives are not case inflected (except for the genitive of proper nouns (names): -s, -'s or -'). In the spoken language cases and case inflections had already gradually disappeared from a much earlier date on (probably the 15th century) as in many continental West Germanic dialects.

Inflection of adjectives is more complicated. The adjective receives no ending with indefinite neuter nouns in singular (as with een /ən/ 'a/an'), and -e in all other cases. (This was also the case in Middle English, as in "a goode man".) Fiets belongs to the masculine/feminine category, while water and huis are neuter.

	Masculine singular or feminine singular	Neuter singular	Plural (any gender)
Definite (with definite article or pronoun)	de mooie fiets ("the beautiful bicycle") onze mooie fiets ("our beautiful bicycle") deze mooie fiets ("this beautiful bicycle")	het mooie huis ("the beautiful house") ons mooie huis ("our beautiful house") dit mooie huis ("this beautiful house")	de mooie fietsen ("the beautiful bicycles") de mooie huizen ("the beautiful houses") onze mooie fietsen ("our beautiful bicycles") deze mooie huizen ("these beautiful houses")
Indefinite (with indefinite article or no article and no pronoun)	een mooie fiets ("a beautiful bicycle") koude soep ("cold soup")	een mooi huis ("a beautiful house") koud water ("cold water")	mooie fietsen ("beautiful bicycles") mooie huizen ("beautiful houses")

An adjective has no e if it is in the predicative: De soep is koud.

More complex inflection is still found in certain lexicalised expressions like de heer des huizes (literally, "the man of the house"), etc. These are usually remnants of cases (in this instance, the genitive case which is still used in German, cf. Der Herr des Hauses) and other inflections no longer in general use today. In such lexicalised expressions remnants of strong and weak nouns can be found too, e.g. in het jaar des Heren (Anno Domini), where -en is actually the genitive ending of the weak noun. Similarly in some place names: ‌'s-Gravenbrakel, ‌'s-Hertogenbosch, etc. (with weak genitives of graaf "count", hertog "duke"). Also in this case, German retains this feature.

=== Word order ===
Dutch shares much of its word order with German. Dutch exhibits subject–object–verb word order, but in main clauses the conjugated verb is moved into the second position in what is known as verb second or V2 word order. This makes Dutch word order almost identical to that of German, but often different from English, which has subject–verb–object word order and has since lost the V2 word order that existed in Old English.

An example sentence used in some Dutch language courses and textbooks is "Ik kan mijn pen niet vinden omdat het veel te donker is", which translates into English word for word as "I can my pen not find because it far too dark is", but in standard English word order would be written "I cannot find my pen because it is far too dark". If the sentence is split into a main and subclause and the verbs highlighted, the logic behind the word order can be seen.

Main clause: "Ik kan mijn pen niet vinden"

Verb infinitives are placed in final position, but the finite, conjugated verb, in this case "kan" (can), is made the second element of the clause.

In subordinate clauses: "omdat het veel te donker is", the verb or verbs always go in the final position.

In an interrogative main clause the usual word order is: conjugated verb followed by subject; other verbs in final position:

- "Kun jij je pen niet vinden?" (literally "Can you your pen not find?") "Can't you find your pen?"

In the Dutch equivalent of a wh-question the word order is: interrogative pronoun (or expression) + conjugated verb + subject; other verbs in final position:

- "Waarom kun jij je pen niet vinden?" ("Why can you your pen not find?") "Why can't you find your pen?"

In a tag question the word order is the same as in a declarative clause:

- "Jij kunt je pen niet vinden?" ("You can your pen not find?") "You can't find your pen?"

A subordinate clause does not change its word order:

- "Kun jij je pen niet vinden omdat het veel te donker is?" ("Can you your pen not find because it far too dark is?") "Can you not find your pen because it's far too dark?"

=== Diminutives ===
In Dutch, the diminutive is used extensively. The nuances of meaning expressed by the diminutive are a distinctive aspect of Dutch, and can be difficult for non-native speakers to master. It is very productive and formed by adding one of the suffixes to the noun in question, depending on the latter's phonological ending:

- -je for ending in -b, -c, -d, -t, -f, -g, -ch, -k, -p, -v, -x, -z or -s: neef → neefje (male cousin, nephew)
- -pje for ending in -m: boom (tree) → boompje
- -kje for ending in -ing if the preceding syllable carries the stress: koning (king) → koninkje (the 'ng'-sound transforms into 'nk'); but ring → ringetje (ring), and vondeling → vondelingetje (foundling) without this stress pattern
- -tje for ending in -h, -j, -l, -n, -r, -w, or a vowel other than -y: zoen → zoentje (kiss). A single open vowel is doubled when adding "-tje" would change the pronunciation: auto → autootje (car).
- -′tje for ending in -y and for abbreviations: baby → baby'tje, cd → cd'tje, A4 → A4'tje
- -etje for ending in -b, -l, -n, -ng or -r preceded by a "short" (lax) vowel: bal → balletje (ball). Final consonant is doubled (except for -ng) to preserve the vowel's shortness.

The diminutive suffixes -ke (from which -tje has derived by palatalisation), -eke, -ske, -ie (only for words ending -ch, -k, -p, or -s), -kie (instead of -kje), and -pie (instead of -pje) are used in southern dialects, and the forms ending on -ie as well in northern urban dialects. Some of these form part of expressions that became standard language, like een makkie, from gemak = ease). The noun joch (young boy) has, exceptionally, only the diminutive form jochie, also in standard Dutch. The form -ke is also found in many women's given names: Janneke, Marieke, Marijke, Mieke, Meike etc.

In Dutch, the diminutive is not restricted to nouns, but can be applied to numerals (met z'n tweetjes, "the two of us"), pronouns (onderonsje, "tête-à-tête"), verbal particles (moetje, "shotgun marriage"), and even prepositions (toetje, "dessert"). Adjectives and adverbs commonly take diminutive forms; the former take a diminutive ending and thus function as nouns, while the latter remain adverbs and always have the diminutive with the -s appended, e.g. adjective: groen ("green") → noun: groentje ("rookie"); adverb: even ("a while") → adverb: eventjes ("a little while").

Some nouns have two different diminutives, each with a different meaning: bloem (flower) → bloempje (lit. 'small flower'), but bloemetje (lit. also "small flower", meaning bouquet). A few nouns exist solely in a diminutive form, e.g. zeepaardje (seahorse), while many, e.g. meisje (girl), originally a diminutive of meid (maid), have acquired a meaning independent of their non-diminutive forms. A diminutive can sometimes be added to an uncountable noun to refer to a single portion: ijs (ice, ice cream) → ijsje (ice cream treat, cone of ice cream), bier (beer) → biertje. Some diminutive forms only exist in the plural, e.g. kleertjes (clothing).

When used to refer to time, the Dutch diminutive form can indicate whether the person in question found it pleasant or not: een uurtje kletsen (chatting for a "little" hour.) The diminutive can, however, also be used pejoratively: Hij was weer eens het "mannetje". (He acted as if he was the "little" man.)

All diminutives (even lexicalised ones like "meisje" (girl)) have neuter gender and take neuter concords: "dit kleine meisje", not "deze kleine meisje".

=== Pronouns and determiners ===
There are two series of personal pronouns, subject and objects pronouns. The forms on the right-hand sides within each column are the unemphatic forms; those not normally written are given in brackets. Only ons and u do not have an unemphatic form. The distinction between emphatic and unemphatic pronouns is very important in Dutch. Emphatic pronouns in English use the reflexive pronoun form, but are used to emphasise the subject, not to indicate a direct or indirect object. For example, "I gave (to) myself the money" is reflexive but "I myself gave the money (to someone else) " is emphatic.

person	subject	object
1st person singular	ik – ('k)	mij – me
2nd person singular, informal	jij – je	jou – je
2nd person singular, formal	u	u
3rd person singular, masculine	hij – (ie)	hem – ('m)
3rd person singular, feminine	zij – ze	haar – ('r, d'r)
3rd person singular, neuter	het – ('t)	het – ('t)
1st person plural	wij – we	ons
2nd person plural, informal	jullie – je	jullie – je
2nd person plural, formal	u	u
3rd person plural, for a person	zij – ze	hun, hen – ze
3rd person plural, for an object	zij – ze	die – ze

Like English, Dutch has generalised the dative over the accusative case for all pronouns, e.g. NL 'me', 'je', EN 'me', 'you', vs. DE 'mich'/'mir' 'dich'/'dir'. There is one exception: the standard language prescribes that in the third person plural, hen is to be used for the direct object, and hun for the indirect object. This distinction was artificially introduced in the 17th century by grammarians, and is largely ignored in spoken language and not well understood by Dutch speakers. Consequently, the third person plural forms hun and hen are interchangeable in normal usage, with hun being more common. The shared unstressed form ze is also often used as both direct and indirect objects and is a useful avoidance strategy when people are unsure which form to use.

Dutch also shares with English the presence of h- pronouns, e.g. NL hij, hem, haar, hen, hun and EN he, him, her vs. DE er, ihn, ihr, ihnen.

=== Compounds ===
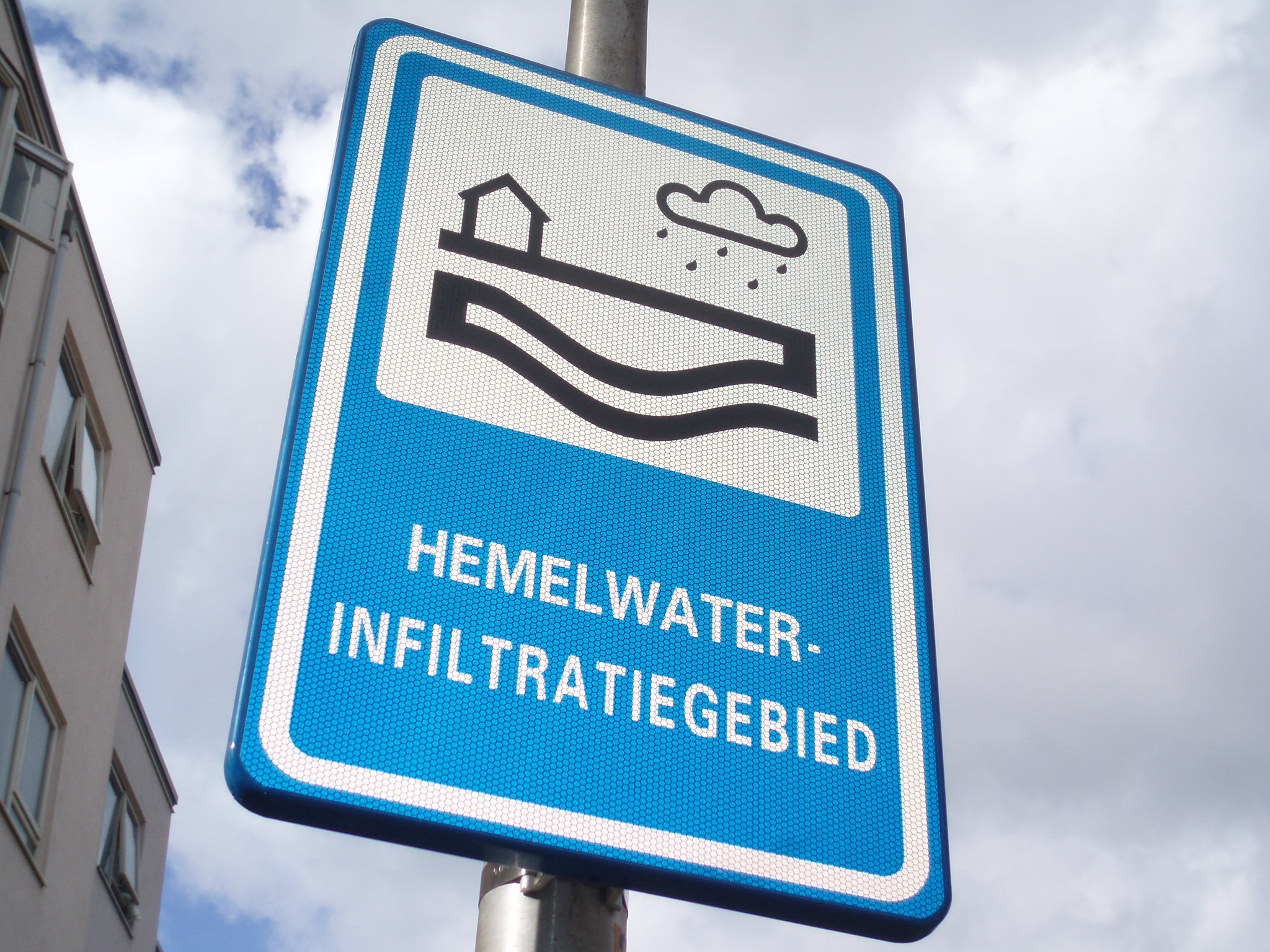
The 27-letter compound hemelwaterinfiltratiegebied (rainwater infiltration area) on a traffic sign in Zwolle, Netherlands

Like most Germanic languages, Dutch forms noun compounds, where the first noun modifies the category given by the second (hondenhok = doghouse). Unlike English, where newer compounds or combinations of longer nouns are often written in open form with separating spaces, Dutch (like the other Germanic languages) either uses the closed form without spaces (boomhut = tree house) or inserts a hyphen (VVD-coryfee = outstanding member of the VVD, a political party). Like German, Dutch allows arbitrarily long compounds, but the longer they get, the less frequent they tend to be.

The longest serious entry in the Van Dale dictionary is wapenstilstandsonderhandeling (ceasefire negotiation). Leafing through the articles of association (Statuten) one may come across a 30-letter vertegenwoordigingsbevoegdheid (authorisation of representation). An even longer word cropping up in official documents is "ziektekostenverzekeringsmaatschappij"(health insurance company) though the shorter zorgverzekeraar (health insurer) is more common.

Notwithstanding official spelling rules, some Dutch-speaking people, like some Scandinavians and German speakers, nowadays tend to write the parts of a compound separately, a practice sometimes dubbed de Engelse ziekte (the English disease).

== Vocabulary ==
Dutch vocabulary is predominantly Germanic in origin, with loanwords accounting for 20%. The main foreign influence on Dutch vocabulary since the 12th century and culminating in the French period has been French and (northern) Oïl languages, accounting for an estimated 6.8% of all words, or more than a third of all loanwords. Latin, which was spoken in the southern Low Countries for centuries and then played a major role as the language of science and religion, follows with 6.1%. High German and Low German were influential until the mid-20th century and account for 2.7%, but they are mostly unrecognisable since many have been "Dutchified": German Fremdling → Dutch vreemdeling. Dutch has borrowed words from English since the mid-19th century, as a consequence of the increasing power and influence of Britain and the United States. English loanwords are about 1.5%, but continue to increase. Many English loanwords become less visible over time as they are either gradually replaced by calques (skyscraper became Dutch wolkenkrabber) or neologisms (bucket list became loodjeslijst). Conversely, Dutch contributed many loanwords to English, accounting for 1.3% of its lexicon.

The main Dutch dictionary is the Van Dale groot woordenboek der Nederlandse taal, which contains some 268,826 headwords. In the field of linguistics, the 45,000-page Woordenboek der Nederlandsche Taal is also widely used. That scholarly endeavour took 147 years to complete and contains all recorded Dutch words from the Early Middle Ages onward.

== Spelling and writing system ==
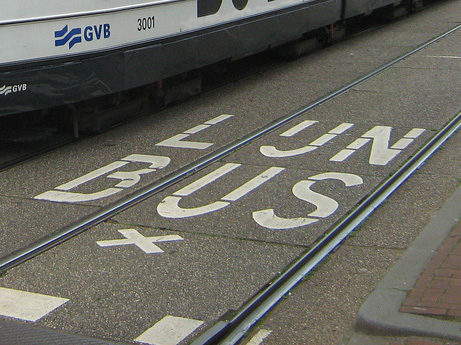
Dutch uses the digraph ⟨ij⟩ as a single letter and it can be seen in several variations. Here, a marking saying lijnbus ("line/route" + "bus"; the tram lane also serves as bus road).

Dutch is written using the Latin script. Dutch uses one additional character beyond the standard alphabet, the digraph ⟨ij⟩. It has a relatively high proportion of doubled letters, both vowels and consonants, due to the formation of compound words and also to the spelling devices for distinguishing the many vowel sounds in the Dutch language. An example of five consecutive doubled letters is the word voorraaddoos (food storage container). The diaeresis (Dutch: trema) is used to mark vowels that are pronounced separately when involving a pre- or suffix, and a hyphen is used when the problem occurs in compound words, e.g. beïnvloed (influenced), de zeeën (the seas) but zee-eend (scoter; lit. sea duck). Generally, other diacritical marks occur only in loanwords. However, the acute accent can also be used for emphasis or to differentiate between two forms, and its most common use is to differentiate between the indefinite article een /ən/ "a, an" and the numeral één /eːn/ "one".

Since the 1980s, the Dutch Language Union has been given the mandate to review and make recommendations on the official spelling of Dutch. Spelling reforms undertaken by the union occurred in 1995 and 2005. In the Netherlands, the official spelling is currently given legal basis by the Spelling Act of September 15, 2005. (Note: See Spellingwet (in Dutch), archived from the original on October 24, 2019) (Note: This came into force on February 22, 2006, replacing the Act on the Spelling of the Dutch Language of February 14, 1947. see Wet voorschriften schrijfwijze Nederlandsche taal (in Dutch), archived from the original on March 24, 2023) The Spelling Act gives the Committee of Ministers of the Dutch Language Union the authority to determine the spelling of Dutch by ministerial decision. In addition, the law requires that this spelling be followed "at the governmental bodies, at educational institutions funded from the public purse, as well as at the exams for which legal requirements have been established". In other cases, it is recommended, but it is not mandatory to follow the official spelling. The Decree on the Spelling Regulations 2005 of 2006 contains the annexed spelling rules decided by the Committee of Ministers on April 25, 2005. (Note: see Besluit bekendmaking spellingvoorschriften 2005 (in Dutch), archived from the original on March 24, 2023) (Note: This decree entered into force on August 1, 2006, replacing the Spelling Decree of June 19, 1996. see Spellingbesluit (in Dutch), archived from the original on March 24, 2023) In Flanders, the same spelling rules are currently applied by the Decree of the Flemish Government Establishing the Rules of the Official Spelling and Grammar of the Dutch language of June 30, 2006. (Note: See Besluit van de Vlaamse Regering tot vaststelling van de regels van de officiële spelling en spraakkunst van de Nederlandse taal (in Dutch), archived from the original on October 27, 2020)

The Woordenlijst Nederlandse taal, more commonly known as het groene boekje (i.e. "the green booklet", because of its colour), is the authoritative orthographic word list (without definitions) of the Dutch Language Union; a version with definitions can be had as Het Groene Woordenboek; both are published by Sdu.

== Example text ==
Dutch pronunciation

Article 1 of the Universal Declaration of Human Rights in Dutch:

Alle mensen worden vrij en gelijk in waardigheid en rechten geboren. Zij zijn begiftigd met verstand en geweten, en behoren zich jegens elkander in een geest van broederschap te gedragen.

Article 1 of the Universal Declaration of Human Rights in English:

All human beings are born free and equal in dignity and rights. They are endowed with reason and conscience and should act towards one another in a spirit of brotherhood.

== See also ==
- Bargoens
- Dutch eight-dot Braille
- Dutch six-dot Braille
- Dutch grammar
- Dutch Language Union
- Dutch literature
- Dutch name
- Dutch orthography
- Dutch-based creole languages
- Flemish
- French Flemish
- Grand Dictation of the Dutch Language
- Indo-European languages
- Istvaeones
- List of English words of Dutch origin
- List of countries and territories where Afrikaans or Dutch are official languages
- Low Franconian
- Meuse-Rhenish
- Middle Dutch
- Old Frankish
- Surinamese Dutch

== General and cited references ==
- Abraham, Werner (2006), "Case, valency and transitivity: Bare and prepositional differential case marking", in Kulikov, L.I.; Malchukov, A.L.; De Swart, Peter (eds.), Studies in Language, vol. 77, John Benjamins Publishing Company, ISBN 9027230870
- Adegbija, Efurosibina E. (1994), Language Attitudes in Sub-Saharan Africa: A Sociolinguistic Overview, Multilingual Matters, ISBN 9781853592393, archived from the original on March 24, 2023
- Alant, Jaco (2004), Parlons Afrikaans (in French), Éditions L'Harmattan, ISBN 9782747576369, archived from the original on March 24, 2023
- Ammon, Ulrich; Dittmar, Norbert; Mattheier, Klaus J.; Trudgill, Peter, eds. (2006). Sociolinguistics: an international handbook of the science of language and society. Vol. 3 (2nd, revised and extended ed.). Walter de Gruyter. ISBN 9783110184181.
- Baker, Colin; Prys Jones, Sylvia (1998), Encyclopedia of bilingualism and bilingual education, Multilingual Matters Ltd., ISBN 9781853593628, archived from the original on February 11, 2023
- Berdichevsky, Norman (2004), Nations, language, and citizenship, Norman Berdichevsky, ISBN 9780786427000, archived from the original on March 24, 2023
- Batibo, Herman (2005), Language decline and death in Africa: causes, consequences, and challenges, Multilingual Matters Ltd, ISBN 9781853598081, archived from the original on March 24, 2023
- Booij, Geert (1999), "The Phonology of Dutch.", Oxford Linguistics, Oxford University Press, ISBN 0-19-823869-X, archived from the original on March 9, 2023
- Booij, Geert (2003), "Constructional idioms and periphrasis: the progressive construction in Dutch." (PDF), Paradigms and Periphrasis, University of Kentucky, archived from the original (PDF) on May 3, 2011
- Pierre, Brachin (1985), The Dutch Language: A Survey, translated by Vincent, Paul, Leiden: E.J. Brill, ISBN 9004075933, archived from the original on March 24, 2023
- Bromber, Katrin; Smieja, Birgit (2004), "Globalisation and African languages: risks and benefits", Trends in Linguistics, Walter de Gruyter, ISBN 9783110180992, archived from the original on March 24, 2023
- Brook Napier, Diane (2007), "Language of the land: policy, politics, identity: Languages, language learning, and nationalism in South Africa", in Schuster, Katherine; Witkosky, David (eds.), Studies in the history of education, Information Age Publishing, ISBN 9781593116170, archived from the original on March 24, 2023
- Bussmann, Hadumod (2002), Gender across languages, John Benjamins Publishing Company, ISBN 9027218439
- Classe, Olive (2000), "Encyclopedia of Literary Translation into English", Second Edition, Fitzroy Dearborn, ISBN 9781884964367
- Clyne, Michael G. (2003), Dynamics of language contact: English and immigrant languages, Cambridge University Press, ISBN 9780521786485
- Crisma, Paola; Longobarde, Giuseppe (2009), "Historical syntax and linguistic theory", Oxford linguistics, Oxford University Press US, ISBN 9780191567988
- Czepluch, Hartmut; Abraham, Werner (2004), Focus on Germanic typology, Akademie Verlag, ISBN 9783050041063
- Conradie, C. Jac (2005), "The final stages of deflection – The case of Afrikaans "het"", Historical Linguistics 2005, John Benjamins Publishing Company, ISBN 9027247994, archived from the original on March 24, 2023
- De Bot, Kees; Lowie, Wander; Verspoor, Marjolyn (2005), Second language acquisition, Routledge, ISBN 9780415338707
- Denning, Keith; Kessler, Brett; Leben, William R. (2007), English vocabulary elements, Oxford University Press US, ISBN 9780199724352
- Deprez, Kas (1997), "Diets, Nederlands, Nederduits, Hollands, Vlaams, Belgisch Nederlands", in Clyne, Michael G. (ed.), Undoing and redoing corpus planning, Walter de Gruyter, pp. 249–312, ISBN 9783110155099
- Deumert, Ana (2002), "Standardization and social networks – The emergence and diffusion of standard Afrikaans", Standardization – Studies from the Germanic languages, John Benjamins Publishing Company, ISBN 9027247471, archived from the original on March 24, 2023
- Deumert, Ana; Vandenbussche, Wim (2003), "Germanic standardizations: past to present", Trends in Linguistics, John Benjamins Publishing Company, ISBN 9027218560, archived from the original on March 24, 2023
- Deumert, Ana (2004), Language Standardization and Language Change: The Dynamics of Cape Dutch, John Benjamins Publishing Company, ISBN 9027218579, archived from the original on March 24, 2023
- de Swaan, Abram (2001), Words of the world: the global language system, A. de Swaan, ISBN 9780745627489, archived from the original on March 24, 2023
- De Vogelaer, Gunther (2009), "Language variation—European perspectives II: Changing pronominal gender in Dutch: transmission or diffusion?", in Tsiplakou, Stavroula; Karyolemou, Marilena; Pavlou, Pavlos Y. (eds.), International Conference on Language Variation in Europe, John Benjamins Publishing Company, ISBN 9789027234858
- Domínguez, Francesc; López, Núria (1995), Sociolinguistic and language planning organizations, John Benjamins Publishing Company, ISBN 9027219516, archived from the original on March 24, 2023
- Donaldson, Bruce C. (1993), A grammar of Afrikaans, Walter de Gruyter, ISBN 9783110134261, archived from the original on January 23, 2023
- Egil Breivik, Leiv; Håkon Jahr, Ernst (1987), Language change: contributions to the study of its causes, Walter de Gruyter, ISBN 9783110119954, archived from the original on March 24, 2023
- Erdentuğ, Aygen; Colombijn, Freek (2002), Urban ethnic encounters: the spatial consequences, Routledge, ISBN 9780203218778
- European Commission (2010), "Flemish in France", Research Centre of Multilingualism, Euromosaic, archived from the original on June 20, 2019
- Fitzpatrick, Eileen (2007), "Corpus linguistics beyond the word: corpus research from phrase to discourse, Volume 2004", Language and Computers: Studies in Practical Linguistics, vol. 60, Rodopi, ISBN 978-9042021358
- Geerts, G.; Clyne, Michael G. (1992), Pluricentric languages: differing norms in different nations, Walter de Gruyter, ISBN 9783110128550, archived from the original on March 24, 2023
- Gooskens, Charlotte (2007), "The Contribution of Linguistic Factors to the Intelligibility of Closely Related Languages" (PDF), Journal of Multilingual and Multicultural Development, Volume 28, Issue November 6, 2007, University of Groningen, pp. 445–467, archived (PDF) from the original on April 11, 2019
- Heeringa, Wilbert; de Wet, Febe (2007), The origin of Afrikaans pronunciation: a comparison to west Germanic languages and Dutch dialects (PDF), University of Groningen, pp. 445–467, archived from the original (PDF) on April 29, 2011
- Herriman, Michael L.; Burnaby, Barbara (1996), Language policies in English-dominant countries: six case studies, Multilingual Matters Ltd., ISBN 9781853593468, archived from the original on March 24, 2023
- Hiskens, Frans; Auer, Peter; Kerswill, Paul (2005), The study of dialect convergence and divergence: conceptual and methodological considerations (PDF), Lancaster University, archived (PDF) from the original on October 9, 2022
- Hogg, Richard M. (2002), An introduction to Old English, Oxford University Press US, ISBN 9780195219487
- Holm, John A. (1989), Pidgins and Creoles: References survey, Cambridge University Press, ISBN 9780521359405, archived from the original on March 24, 2023
- Ingram, David (1989), First language acquisition: method, description, and explanation, Cambridge University Press, ISBN 9780521349161
- Jansen, Carel; Schreuder, Robert; Neijt, Anneke (2007), "The influence of spelling conventions on perceived plurality in compounds. A comparison of Afrikaans and Dutch." (PDF), Written Language & Literacy 10:2, Radboud University Nijmegen, archived from the original (PDF) on April 29, 2011
- Jones, Russell (2008), "Loan-words in Indonesian and Malay", Indonesian Etymological Project, KITLV Office Jakarta, Yayasan Obor Indonesia, ISBN 9789794617014
- Jordens, Peter; Lalleman, Josine A. (1988), "Language development", Algemene Vereniging voor Taalwetenschap, vol. 5, Walter de Gruyter, ISBN 9789067654012
- Kager, René (1989), "A metrical theory of stress and destressing in English and Dutch", Linguistic models, vol. 14, Walter de Gruyter, ISBN 9789067654364
- Kamwangamalu, Nkonko M. (2004), Baldauf, Richard B.; Kaplan, Robert B. (eds.), Language planning and policy in Africa: The language planning situation in South Africa, Multilingual Matters Ltd., ISBN 9781853597251, archived from the original on March 24, 2023
- Kennedy Wyld, Henry Cecil (2009), The Growth of English: An Elementary Account of the Present Form of Our Language, and Its Development, BiblioBazaar, LLC, ISBN 9781103063192
- Langer, Nils; Davies, Winifred V. (2005), Linguistic purism in the Germanic languages, Walter de Gruyter, ISBN 9783110183375, archived from the original on March 24, 2023
- Lass, Roger (1994), Old English: a historical linguistic companion, Cambridge University Press, ISBN 9780521458481
- Lightfoot, David (1999), "The development of language: acquisition, change, and evolution", Blackwell/Maryland lectures in language and cognition, vol. 1, Wiley-Blackwell, ISBN 9780631210603
- Machan, Tim William (2009), Language anxiety: conflict and change in the history of English, Oxford University Press, ISBN 9780191552489, archived from the original on March 24, 2023
- Maier, H.M.J. (2005), A Hidden Language – Dutch in Indonesia, Institute of European Studies, UC Berkeley, archived from the original on January 19, 2012
- Mallory, J.P.; Adams, Douglas Q. (2006), The Oxford introduction to Proto-Indo-European and the Proto-Indo-European world, Oxford University Press, ISBN 9780199287918
- Maurer, Friedrich (1942), Nordgermanen und Alemannen: Studien zur germanischen und frühdeutschen Sprachgeschichte, Stammes- und Volkskunde, Strasbourg: Hünenburg.
- McGoldrick, Monica; Giordano, Joseph; Garcia-Preto, Nydia (2005), Ethnicity and family therapy, Guilford Press, ISBN 9781606237946, archived from the original on March 24, 2023
- McLean, Daryl; McCormick, Kay (1996), Fishman, Joshua A.; Conrad, Andrew W.; Rubal-Lopez, Alma (eds.), Post-imperial English: status change in former British and American colonies, 1940–1990: English in South Africa 1940–1996, Walter de Gruyter, ISBN 9783110147544, archived from the original on March 24, 2023
- Mennen, Ineke; Levelt, Clara; Gerrits, Ellen (2006), "Acquisition of Dutch phonology: an overview.", Speech Science Research Centre Working Paper WP10, Queen Margaret University College, archived from the original on May 13, 2021
- Mesthrie, Rajend, ed. (1995), Language and Social History: Studies in South African Sociolinguistics, New Africa Books, ISBN 9780864862808, archived from the original on March 24, 2023
- Mesthrie, Rajend (2002), Language in South Africa, Cambridge University Press, ISBN 9780521791052, archived from the original on March 24, 2023
- Müller, Gereon (1995), A-bar syntax: a study in movement types, Walter de Gruyter, ISBN 9783110144697
- Myers-Scotton, Carol (2006), Multiple voices: an introduction to bilingualism, Blackwell Publishing, ISBN 9780631219378, archived from the original on March 24, 2023
- Niesler, Thomas; Louw, Philippa; Roux, Justus (2005), "Phonetic analysis of Afrikaans, English, Xhosa and Zulu using South African speech databases" (PDF), Southern African Linguistics and Applied Language Studies, 23 (4): 459–474, doi:10.2989/16073610509486401, S2CID 7138676, archived from the original (PDF) on December 21, 2012
- Onysko, Alexander; Michel, Sascha (2010), Cognitive Perspectives on Word Formation, Walter de Gruyter, ISBN 9783110223590
- Palmer, Vernon Valentine (2001), Mixed jurisdictions worldwide: the third legal family, Vernon V. Palmer, ISBN 9780521781541, archived from the original on March 24, 2023
- Page, Melvin Eugene; Sonnenburg, Penny M. (2003), Colonialism: an international, social, cultural, and political encyclopedia, Melvin E. Page, ISBN 9781576073353, archived from the original on January 11, 2023
- Proost, Kristel (2006), "Von Intentionalität zur Bedeutung konventionalisierter Zeichen: Spuren der Kreolisierung im Lexikon des Afrikaans", in Proost, Kristel; Winkler, Edeltraud (eds.), Studien zur Deutschen Sprache (in German), Gunter Narr Verlag, ISBN 9783823362289, archived from the original on March 24, 2023
- Putnam, Michael T. (2011), Studies on German-language Islands, John Benjamins Publishing Company, ISBN 978-9027205902, archived from the original on March 24, 2023
- Réguer, Laurent Philippe (2004), Si loin, si proche...: Une langue européenne à découvrir: le néerlandais (in French), Sorbonne Nouvelle, ISBN 9782910212308, archived from the original on March 24, 2023
- Sebba, Mark (1997), Contact languages: pidgins and creoles, Palgrave Macmillan, ISBN 9780312175719, archived from the original on March 24, 2023
- Sebba, Mark (2007), Spelling and society: the culture and politics of orthography around the world, Cambridge University Press, ISBN 9781139462020, archived from the original on March 24, 2023
- Shetter, William Z.; Ham, Esther (2007), Dutch: an essential grammar, Taylor & Francis, ISBN 9780199286751, archived from the original on March 24, 2023
- Simpson, Andrew (2008), Language and national identity in Africa, Oxford University Press, ISBN 9780199286751, archived from the original on March 24, 2023
- Simpson, J.M.Y. (2009), Brown, Keith; Ogilvie, Sarah (eds.), Concise encyclopedia of languages of the world: Dutch, Elsevier, ISBN 9780080877754, archived from the original on March 24, 2023
- Sneddon, James N. (2003), The Indonesian language: its history and role in modern society, UNSW Press, ISBN 9780868405988
- Sonnenschein, E.A. (2008), A New English Grammar Based on the Recommendations of the Joint Committee on Grammatical Terminology, Read Books, ISBN 9781408689295
- Stell, Gerard (2008), Mapping linguistic communication across colour divides: Black Afrikaans in Central South Africa, Vrije Universiteit Brussel, archived from the original on October 6, 2011
- Swan, Michael; Smith, Bernard (2001), Learner English: a teacher's guide to interference and other problems, Volume 1, Cambridge University Press, ISBN 9780521779395
- Tadmor, Uri (2009), "Loanwords in Indonesian", in Martin Haspelmath; Uri Tadmor (eds.), Loanwords in the World's Languages: A Comparative Handbook, Berlin: Walter de Gruyter, pp. 686–716, ISBN 9783110218435, archived from the original on March 24, 2023
- Tan, Mely G. (2008), "Etnis Tionghoa di Indonesia: kumpulan tulisan", Ethnic Chinese in Indonesia; collected articles., Yayasan Obor Indonesia, ISBN 9789794616895
- Thomson, William R. (2003), Page, Kogan (ed.), Asia & Pacific Review 2003/04: The Economic and Business Report: Indonesia, Kogan Page Publishers, pp. 76–85, ISBN 9780749440633
- Todd, Loreto (2004), Pidgins and Creoles, Routledge, ISBN 9780415053112
- Verhoeven, Jo (2005), "Belgian Standard Dutch", Journal of the International Phonetic Association, 35 (2): 243–247, doi:10.1017/S0025100305002173
- Vos, Mei Li (2001), International cooperation between politics and practice: how Dutch Indonesian cooperation changed remarkably little after a diplomatic rupture, Het Spinhuis, ISBN 9789055892013
- Webb, Victor N. (2002), "Language in South Africa: the role of language in national transformation, reconstruction and development", Impact Studies in Language and Society, John Benjamins Publishing Company, ISBN 9027218498, archived from the original on March 24, 2023
- Webb, Victor N. (2003), "Language policy development in South Africa" (PDF), Centre for Research in the Politics of Language, University of Pretoria, archived from the original (PDF) on December 9, 2003
- Weissenborn, Jürgen; Höhle, Barbara (2001), "Approaches to bootstrapping", Phonological, lexical, syntactic and neurophysiological aspects of early language acquisition, vol. 1, John Benjamins Publishing Company, ISBN 9027224919
- Willemyns, Roland (2013), Dutch: Biography of a Language, Oxford University Press, ISBN 9780199858712
- Namibian Population Census (2001), Languages Spoken in Namibia, Government of Namibia, archived from the original on May 16, 2010
- CIA (2010), The World Factbook (CIA) — Namibia, Central Intelligence Agency, archived from the original on January 10, 2021
