= Dutch eight-dot Braille =

- Script type: Alphabet (non-linear)
- Creator: Braille-Autoriteit
- Period: 28 October 2020 – present
- Print basis: Dutch alphabet
- Languages: Dutch

Related scripts
- Parent systems: Braille: German Braille; Dutch six-dot Braille; Dutch eight-dot Braille

Unicode
- Unicode range: U+2800 to U+283F

Dutch eight-dot Braille is the Braille alphabet of the Dutch language. It is very close to Dutch six-dot Braille, but uses eight-dot cells, with the extra pair of dots at the bottom of each cell to indicate capitalization and accent marks.

== History ==
Eight-dot Braille was introduced by manufacturers of Braille displays, extending the traditional six-dot system. For the Dutch language, no official eight-dot Braille table existed until 28 October 2020, when the Braille-Autoriteit published the first version of a Dutch eight-dot Braille standard under its initiative. This 2020 version was published on 28 October 2020 and came into effect on 31 December 2020. The second version of the standard, was published on 8 February 2023 and came into effect on 1 April 2023.

== Letters ==
| Majuscule | | | Miniscule | | |
| Image | Braille | Letter | Image | Braille | Letter |
|---|---|---|---|---|---|
| ⡁ (braille pattern dots-17) | ⡁ | A | ⠁ (braille pattern dots-1) | ⠁ | a |
| ⡃ (braille pattern dots-127) | ⡃ | B | ⠃ (braille pattern dots-12) | ⠃ | b |
| ⡉ (braille pattern dots-147) | ⡉ | C | ⠉ (braille pattern dots-14) | ⠉ | c |
| ⡙ (braille pattern dots-1457) | ⡙ | D | ⠙ (braille pattern dots-145) | ⠙ | d |
| ⡑ (braille pattern dots-157) | ⡑ | E | ⠑ (braille pattern dots-15) | ⠑ | e |
| ⡋ (braille pattern dots-1247) | ⡋ | F | ⠋ (braille pattern dots-124) | ⠋ | f |
| ⡛ (braille pattern dots-12457) | ⡛ | G | ⠛ (braille pattern dots-1245) | ⠛ | g |
| ⡓ (braille pattern dots-1257) | ⡓ | H | ⠓ (braille pattern dots-125) | ⠓ | h |
| ⡊ (braille pattern dots-247) | ⡊ | I | ⠊ (braille pattern dots-24) | ⠊ | i |
| ⡚ (braille pattern dots-2457) | ⡚ | J | ⠚ (braille pattern dots-245) | ⠚ | j |
| ⡅ (braille pattern dots-137) | ⡅ | K | ⠅ (braille pattern dots-13) | ⠅ | k |
| ⡇ (braille pattern dots-1237) | ⡇ | L | ⠇ (braille pattern dots-123) | ⠇ | l |
| ⡍ (braille pattern dots-1347) | ⡍ | M | ⠍ (braille pattern dots-134) | ⠍ | m |
| ⡝ (braille pattern dots-13457) | ⡝ | N | ⠝ (braille pattern dots-1345) | ⠝ | n |
| ⡕ (braille pattern dots-1357) | ⡕ | O | ⠕ (braille pattern dots-135) | ⠕ | o |
| ⡏ (braille pattern dots-12347) | ⡏ | P | ⠏ (braille pattern dots-1234) | ⠏ | p |
| ⡟ (braille pattern dots-123457) | ⡟ | Q | ⠟ (braille pattern dots-12345) | ⠟ | q |
| ⡗ (braille pattern dots-12357) | ⡗ | R | ⠗ (braille pattern dots-1235) | ⠗ | r |
| ⡎ (braille pattern dots-2347) | ⡎ | S | ⠎ (braille pattern dots-234) | ⠎ | s |
| ⡞ (braille pattern dots-23457) | ⡞ | T | ⠞ (braille pattern dots-2345) | ⠞ | t |
| ⡥ (braille pattern dots-1367) | ⡥ | U | ⠥ (braille pattern dots-136) | ⠥ | u |
| ⡧ (braille pattern dots-12367) | ⡧ | V | ⠧ (braille pattern dots-1236) | ⠧ | v |
| ⡺ (braille pattern dots-24567) | ⡺ | W | ⠺ (braille pattern dots-2456) | ⠺ | w |
| ⡭ (braille pattern dots-13467) | ⡭ | X | ⠭ (braille pattern dots-1346) | ⠭ | x |
| ⡽ (braille pattern dots-134567) | ⡽ | Y | ⠽ (braille pattern dots-13456) | ⠽ | y |
| ⡵ (braille pattern dots-13567) | ⡵ | Z | ⠵ (braille pattern dots-1356) | ⠵ | z |

== Numbers ==
The digits 1–9 are formed by adding Braille dot 6 to the letters A–I. The number 0 is an exception, as J with dot 6 is already used for the letter W.

| Image | ⠬ (braille pattern dots-346) | ⠡ (braille pattern dots-16) | ⠣ (braille pattern dots-126) | ⠩ (braille pattern dots-146) | ⠹ (braille pattern dots-1456) | ⠱ (braille pattern dots-156) | ⠫ (braille pattern dots-1246) | ⠻ (braille pattern dots-12456) | ⠳ (braille pattern dots-1256) | ⠪ (braille pattern dots-246) |
| Braille | ⠬ | ⠡ | ⠣ | ⠩ | ⠹ | ⠱ | ⠫ | ⠻ | ⠳ | ⠪ |
| Number | 0 | 1 | 2 | 3 | 4 | 5 | 6 | 7 | 8 | 9 |

== Punctuation ==
In Dutch six-dot Braille, there are overlapping assignments between punctuation marks and mathematical symbols. The most notable examples are the plus sign and the exclamation mark, as well as the quotation mark and the equals sign. In eight-dot Braille, the punctuation marks are retained, while dot 8 is added to distinguish the mathematical symbols.

| Image | ⠖ (braille pattern dots-235) | ⠶ (braille pattern dots-2356) | ⠯ (braille pattern dots-12346) | ⠄ (braille pattern dots-3) | ⠦ (braille pattern dots-236) | ⠴ (braille pattern dots-356) | ⠔ (braille pattern dots-35) | ⠂ (braille pattern dots-2) | ⠤ (braille pattern dots-36) | ⠲ (braille pattern dots-256) | ⠌ (braille pattern dots-34) | ⠒ (braille pattern dots-25) | ⠆ (braille pattern dots-23) | ⠢ (braille pattern dots-26) |
| Braille | ⠖ | ⠶ | ⠯ | ⠄ | ⠦ | ⠴ | ⠔ | ⠂ | ⠤ | ⠲ | ⠌ | ⠒ | ⠆ | ⠢ |
| Punctuation | ! | " | & | ' | ( | ) | * | , | - | . | / | : | ; | ? |

== Mathematical notation ==
Because the eight-dot Braille system allows for 256 possible dot combinations, it cannot represent all graphical mathematical symbols. In practice, Flemish and Dutch users rely on linear mathematical notation systems, such as those developed by Dedicon or the Flemish Mathematical Code (VWC), which replace graphical symbols with keyboard-friendly characters. These conventions are supported by the eight-dot Braille standard.
