= Dutch six-dot Braille =

Braille alphabet used for the Dutch language

Dutch six-dot Braille Netherland Braille
- Script type: Alphabet
- Creator: Vlaams-Nederlandse Braille-commissie (1946–1947)
- Print basis: Dutch alphabet
- Languages: Dutch

Related scripts
- Parent systems: Braille: German Braille; Dutch six-dot Braille

Dutch six-dot Braille is the braille alphabet used for the Dutch language in the Netherlands and in Flanders.

== History ==
In the Netherlands, braille was introduced in 1890. In Belgium, braille has been in use at least since the foundation of the Brailleliga in 1922, but probably earlier.

Over the course of time, five different braille alphabets have been in use. One of these early alphabets was based on the pronunciation of Dutch. It is still used for example by office clerks and students for making notes.

In 1946, the Vlaams-Nederlandse Braille-commissie (Flemish–Netherlands Braille Committee) was founded to decide on a uniform braille alphabet for the Dutch language. This was introduced in 1947.

== Alphabet ==
Netherland Braille assigns international y to the vowel ij. Three letters for print digraphs follow German Braille (though Dutch oe [u] is pronounced very differently from German oe/ö).

a, 1	b, 2	c, 3	d, 4	e, 5	f, 6	g, 7	h, 8	i, 9	j, 0
k	l	m	n	o	p	q	r	s	t
u	v	w	x	ij	z	oe	ch	sch	

For letters with diacritics in foreign words, French Braille is used. Where this conflicts with Dutch values (y/ij, ö/oe, ô/ch, û/sch), a dot-6 prefix is used to specify the French reading: ⠠⠽ y, ⠠⠱ û.

Unesco (2013) presents a Dutch Braille alphabet that is identical to the French. It appears that this is Belgian Dutch Braille.

== Punctuation ==
,	;	:	.	?	!	( )	“	”	’	-	/	*	&

Unesco (2013) has the opposite assignments for parentheses and quotation marks, ⠦⠀⠴ and ⠶⠀⠶ respectively. They also add ⠷ and ⠾ for square brackets, [ ]. This appears to be Belgian usage.

== Formatting ==
(Cap)	(CAPS)	(italic)	(num.)

== See also ==
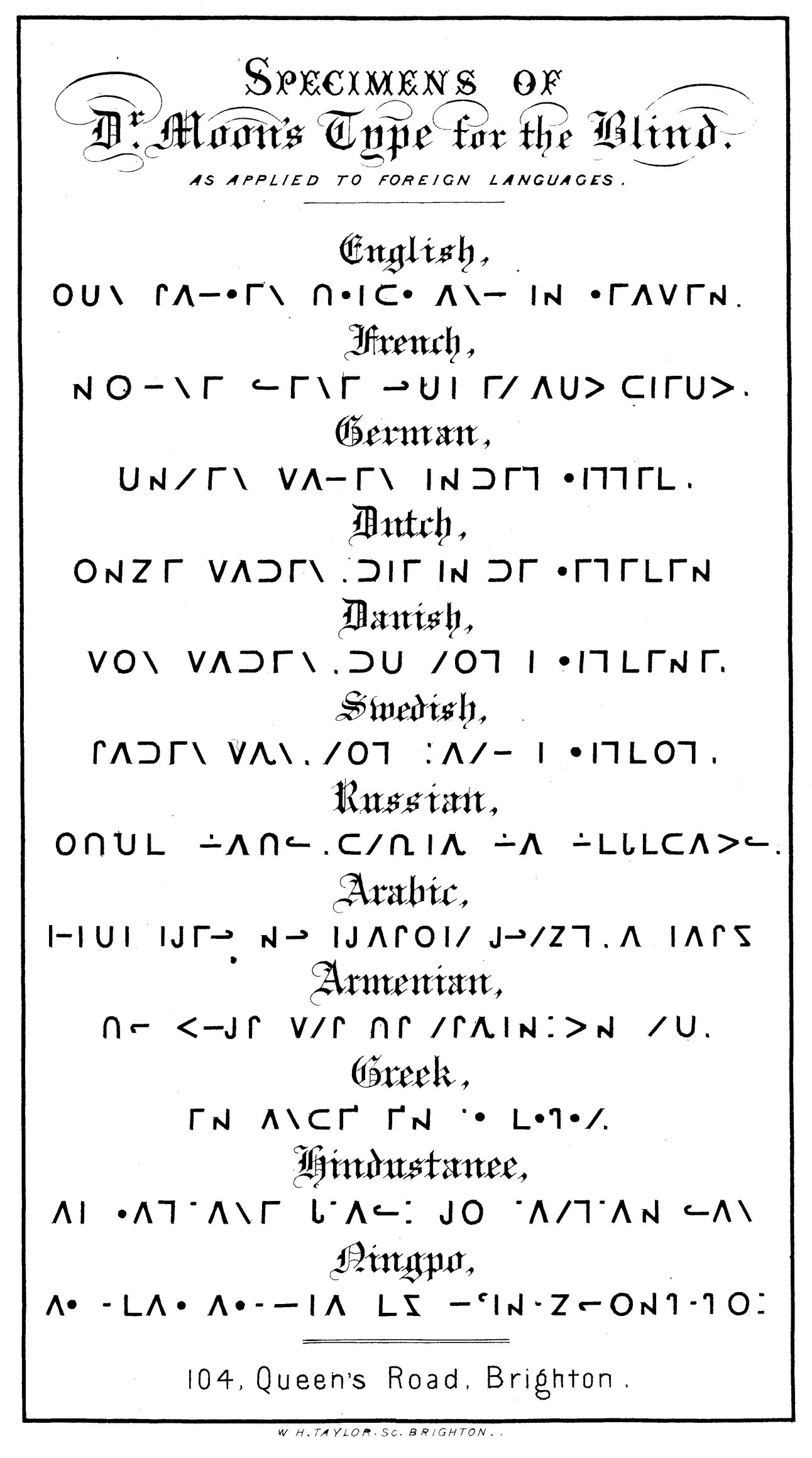
A sample of Moon type in various languages including Dutch.

- Moon type is a simplification of the Latin alphabet for embossing. An adaptation of Dutch-reading blind people has been proposed.
