= Accessible Books Consortium =

Open-access advocacy organization

- The ABC logo is in the form of an open book, with ABC depicted in both Braille and letters
- Formation: 2014
- Headquarters: World Intellectual Property Organization headquarters
- Location: Geneva, Switzerland
- Region served: Worldwide
- Services: To increase the number of books worldwide in accessible formats
- Parent organization: World Intellectual Property Organization
- Website: www.accessiblebooksconsortium.org

The Accessible Books Consortium (ABC) is a public-private partnership which was launched in 2014 by the World Intellectual Property Organization. The ABC was created with the intent of being "one possible initiative, amongst others, to implement the aims of the Marrakesh VIP Treaty at a practical level." ABC's goal is "to increase the number of books worldwide in accessible formats – such as braille, audio, e-text, and large print and to make them available to people who are blind, have low vision or are otherwise print disabled."

== Context ==
The World Health Organization estimated in 2018 that worldwide 253 million people are visually impaired, with more than 90% of them living in developing and least developed countries. The World Blind Union (WBU) estimates that only 10% of people who are blind are able to go to school or have employment. World Blind Union (WBU) estimates that less than 10% of all published materials can be read by people who are blind or visually impaired, with the lack of accessible books being a significant barrier to getting an education and leading an independent life.

== Work ==
The Accessible Books Consortium (ABC) operates through three channels:

1. The ABC Global Book Service: hosting an online platform that allows for the cross-border exchange of books in accessible formats. The Service contains over one million titles in over 80 languages, with English, French and Spanish being the predominant languages.
2. Training and Technical Assistance: establishing projects in developing and least-developed countries to "provide training and funding for the production of educational materials in accessible formats in national languages for students who are print disabled."
3. Accessible Publishing: promoting the production of "born accessible" publications by all publishers. Born accessible books are usable by both people who are print disabled or sighted. ABC encourage accessible publishing through the ABC Charter for Accessible Publishing and the ABC International Excellence Award, which 'recognizes outstanding leadership and achievements in advancing the accessibility of digital publications'.

== Accessible Books Consortium (ABC) Global Book Service ==
The ABC Global Book Service is a free service that puts into practice the provisions of the Marrakesh Treaty. It allows participating libraries for the blind, referred to in the Marrakesh Treaty as Authorized Entities (AEs), to search, order and exchange books in accessible digital formats across national borders. Through the Service, Authorized Entities that are located in countries that have implemented the provisions of the Marrakesh Treaty are able to perform these exchanges without requiring further authorization from rights holders.

Through their participation in the Service, AEs are able to make the accessible books that are shared by all other AEs available to their own patrons. By pooling their collective resources in this way, libraries can vastly increase their selection of books in large-print, audio books, digital braille and braille music.

In April 2021, ABC launched an additional application that allows individuals who are blind, visually impaired or otherwise print disabled to have direct access to search and download books in accessible formats from the ABC Global Book Service. This new application is offered to Authorized Entities located in countries that have ratified and implemented the provisions of the Marrakesh Treaty.

=== List of authorized entities that have joined the ABC Global Book Service ===
Country	Organization
Antigua and Barbuda	The Unit for the Blind and Visually Impaired (UBV)
Argentina	Asociación Civil Tiflonexos (Tiflonexos)
Australia	VisAbility
Australia	Vision Australia (VA)
Austria	Hörbücherei (HBOE)
Bangladesh	Young Power in Social Action (YPSA)
Belgium	Luisterpuntbibliotheek previously known as Flemish Library for Audiobooks and Braille LPB
Belgium	L'CEuvre Nationale des Aveugles (EQLA)
Belgium	Ligue Braille (LBB)
Bhutan	The Muenselling Institute (MI)
Bolivia (Plurinational State of)	Instituto Boliviano de la Ceguera (IBC)
Brazil	Fundação Dorina Nowill para Cegos
Bulgaria	The National Library for the Blind "Louis Braille 1928"
Burkina Faso	Union Nationale Des Associations Burkinabé pour la Promotion des Aveugles et Malvoyants (UNABPAM)
Canada	BC Libraries Cooperative 2009, National Network for Equitable Library Service (NNELS)
Canada	Bibliothèque et Archives Nationales du Québec (BAnQ)
Canada	Canadian National Institute for the Blind (CNIB)
Canada	Centre for Equitable Library Access (CELA)
Chile	Biblioteca Central para Ciegos (BCC)
Chile	Fundación Chile, Música y Braille
China	China Braille Library
China	China Braille Press
Colombia	Instituto Nacional para Ciegos (INCI)
Croatia	Croatian Library for the Blind (CLB)
Cyprus	Pancyprian Organization of the Blind
Czech Republic	Czech Blind United (SONS)
Denmark	Danish National Library for Persons with Print Disabilities (NOTA)
Dominican Republic	Asociación de Ciegos del Cibao de la República Dominicana (ACICIRD)
Dominican Republic	Biblioteca Nacional Pedro Henríquez Ureña (BNPHU)
Dominican Republic	Fundación Francina Hungría (FFH)
Egypt	Biblioteca Alexandrina (BA)
Estonia	The Estonian Library for the Blind (EPR)
Finland	Celia Library (CELIA)
France	Accompagner Promouvoir et Intégrer les Déficients Visuels (previously known as Groupement des Intellectuels Aveugles ou Amblyopes) (apiDV)
France	Association Valentin Haüy (AVH)
France	BrailleNet
France	Groupement des Intellectuels Aveugles ou Amblyopes (GIAA)
Germany	German Center for Accessible Reading (previously known as German Central Library for the Blind) (DZB)
Greece	The Hellenic Academic Libraries Link (HEAL-Link) (AMELIB)
Guatemala	Benemérito Comité Pro Ciegos y Sordos de Guatemala (BCPCSG)
Hungary	The Hungarian Federation of the Blind and Partially Sighted (MVGYOSZ)
Iceland	The Icelandic Talking Book Library (HBS)
India	DAISY Forum of India (DFI)
India	Chennai Publishing Services
Ireland	NCBI Library and Media Center (NCBI)
Israel	The Central Library for Blind and Reading Impaired People (CLFB)
Jamaica	Jamaican Society for the Blind (JSB)
Japan	National Diet Library (NDL)
Japan	National Association of Institutions of Information Service for Visually Impaired Persons (NAIIV)
Kazakhstan	The Republican Library for the Blind and Visually Impaired Citizens
Kenya	Kenya Institute for the Blind (KIB)
Kyrgyzstan	The Library and Information Consortium (AFB)
Latvia	Latvian Library for the Blind (LNerB)
Lithuania	Lithuanian Library for the Blind (LAB)
Malawi	University of Malawi, Chancellor College (UOFM)
Malaysia	St. Nicholas' Home, Penang (SNH)
Malta	Malta Libraries (ML)
Mexico	Discapacitados Visuales I.A.P. (DIVIAP)
Republic of Moldova	National Information and Rehabilitation Center of the "Association of the Blind People of Moldova"
Mongolia	The Mongolian National Federation of the Blind (MNFB)
Mongolia	The Braille and Digital Library for Blind, Metropolitan Library of Ulaanbaatar (UBPL)
Myanmar	Myanmar National Association of the Blind (MNAB)
Nepal	Action on Disability Rights and Development (ADRAD)
Netherlands	Bibliotheekservice Passend Lezen (BPL)
Netherlands	Dedicon
New Zealand	Blind Low Vision NZ previously known as Blind Foundation (BLVNZ)
Niger	L'Union Nationale des Aveugles du Niger (UNAN)
Nigeria	Books and Gavel
Norway	Norwegian Library of Talking Books and Braille (NLB)
Pakistan	The Pakistan Foundation Fighting Blindness (PFFB)
Palestine	Palestine Association of Visually Impaired Persons (PAVIP)
Poland	Central Library of Labour and Social Security (DZDN)
Portugal	Biblioteca Nacional de Portugal (BNP)
Qatar	Qatar National Library (QNL)
Republic of Korea	National Library for the Disabled in Korea (NLD)
Romania	Fundația Cartea Călătoare (FCC)
Republic of Moldova	National Information and Rehabilitation Center of the "Association of the Blind People of Moldova"
Russian Federation	Bashkir Republican Special Library for the Blind named after Makarim Husainovich Tukhvatshin
Russian Federation	Russian State Library for the Blind (RGBS)
Russian Federation	St. Petersburg Library for the Blind and Visually Impaired (SPB)
Saint Lucia	St. Lucia Blind Welfare Association (SLBWA)
Saint Vincent and the Grenadines	The National Public Library of St. Vincent and the Grenadines (NPLSG)
Sierra Leone	Educational Centre for the Blind and Visually Impaired (ECBVI)
South Africa	South African Library for the Blind (SALB)
Spain	Organización Nacional de Ciegos Españoles (ONCE)
Sri Lanka	Daisy Lanka Foundation (DLF)
Sweden	Swedish Agency for Accessible Media (MTM)
Switzerland	Biblioteca Braille e del libro parlato della Unitas (UNITAS)
Switzerland	Association pour le Bien des Aveugles et malvoyants (ABA)
Switzerland	Bibliothèque Sonore Romande (BSR)
Switzerland	SBS Swiss Library for the Blind, Visually Impaired and Print Disabled (SBS)
Tajikistan	The National Library of Tajikistan
Thailand	National Library for the Blind and Print Disabled, TAB Foundation (TAB)
Thailand	The Christian Foundation for the Blind in Thailand (CFBT)
Tunisia	Loisirs et Cultures pour les Non et Malvoyants (IBSAR)
Tunisia	Bibliothèque nationale de Tunisie (BNT)
Uganda	Uganda National Association of the Blind (UNAB)
Ukraine	Ostrovskyi Central Specialized Library for the Blind (CLBU)
United Kingdom	Royal National Institute of Blind People (RNIB)
United Kingdom	Torch Trust for the Blind (TT)
United States of America	California State Library, Braille and Talking Book Library (CSL)
United States of America	The Library of Congress, National Library Service for the Blind and Print Disabled (NLS)
United States of America	American Printing House for the Blind (APH)
United States of America	Braille Institute of America (BIA)
Uruguay	Fundación Braille de Uruguay (FBU)
Viet Nam	Sao Mai Vocational and Assistive Technology Center for the Blind (SMCB)
Zimbabwe	Zimbabwe National League of the Blind (ZNLB)

== Training and Technical Assistance ==
The Accessible Books Consortium provides training and technical assistance to organizations in developing and least developed countries on the production of accessible format books. According to the ABC: "the ABC model for capacity building aims to equip organizations in developing and least developed countries with the ability to produce educational materials in national languages to be used by primary, secondary and university students who are print disabled." This allows participating organizations to convert textbooks into accessible formats, such as DAISY, ePUB3, and digital braille. Such assistance has been provided to organizations including in Argentina, Bangladesh, India, Nepal, Nigeria, Sri Lanka and Tunisia.

In February 2021, ABC launched an online course providing similar training on the production of books in accessible formats, in part to 'ensure the continuation of its assistance programs during the COVID-19 pandemic'.

== Accessible publishing ==
The Accessible Books Consortium encourages the production of accessible eBooks through the use of the accessibility features of the EPUB3 standard.

=== ABC International Excellence Award for Accessible Publishing ===
List of winners:

Year	Winner Publisher Category	Winner Initiative Category
2022	Kogan Page (UK)	Mr. Ashoka Bandula Weerawardhana (Sri Lanka)
2021	Taylor & Francis Group (UK)	National Network for Equitable Library Services (NNELS, Canada)
2020	Macmillan Learning (USA)	Fondazione LIA (Italy)
2019	EDITORIAL 5 (ED5) (Brazil)	eKitabu (Kenya)
2018	Hachette Livre (France)	DAISY Forum of India (India)
2017	SAGE Publishing (UK)	Tiflonexos (Argentina)
2016	Elsevier (UK)	Action on Disability Rights and Development (ADRAD) (Nepal) and DK Braille Concept Development Team (part of Penguin Random House) (UK)
2015	Cambridge University Press (UK) and Young Power in Social Action (YPSA) (Bangladesh)	

=== ABC Charter for Accessible Publishing Signatories ===
The Accessible Books Consortium Charter for Accessible Publishing contains eight principles designed to encourage publishers are following accessibility best practices. The Accessible Books Consortium partners include

Country	Organization	Wikidata
Argentina	Ediciones Godot	
Argentina	Ediciones Santillana	
Argentina	Gerbera Ediciones	
Australia	Sydney University Press	
Brazil	Associação Religiosa Editora Mundo Cristão	
Brazil	Brinque-Book Editora de Livros Ltda	
Brazil	Distribuidora Record de Serviços de Imprensa S.A.	
Brazil	É Realizações, Editora, Livraria e Distribuidora Ltda	
Brazil	Ediouro Publicações Ltda	
Brazil	Editora Albanisia Lúcia Dummar Pontes ME	
Brazil	Editora Arqueiro Ltda	
Brazil	Editora Atlas S/A	
Brazil	Editora Bertrand Brasil Ltda	
Brazil	Editora Best Seller Ltda	
Brazil	Editora Biruta Ltda	
Brazil	Editora Bonifácio Ltda	
Brazil	Editora Carambaia EIRELI	
Brazil	Editora Casa da Palavra Produção Editorial Ltda	
Brazil	Editora Claro Enigma Ltda	
Brazil	Editora de Livros Cobogó Ltda (Brazil)	
Brazil	Editora e Produtora Spot 1 Ltda (Brazil)	
Brazil	Editora Filocalia Ltda	
Brazil	Editora Fontanar Ltda	
Brazil	Editora Forense Ltda	
Brazil	Editora Gaivota Ltda	
Brazil	Editora Globo S.A.	
Brazil	Editora Guanabara Koogan Ltda	
Brazil	Editora Intrínseca Ltda	
Brazil	Editora Jaguatirica Digital Ltda	
Brazil	Editora José Olympio Ltda	
Brazil	Editora JPA Ltda	
Brazil	Editora Jurídica da Bahia Ltda	
Brazil	Editora Lendo e Aprendendo Ltda ME	
Brazil	Editora Manole Ltda	
Brazil	Editora Nova Fronteira Participações S/A	
Brazil	Editora Original Ltda	
Brazil	Editora Paz e Terra Ltda	
Brazil	Editora Pequena Zahar Ltda	
Brazil	Editora Prumo Ltda	
Brazil	Editora Record Ltda	
Brazil	Editora Reviravolta Ltda	
Brazil	Editora Rocco Ltda	
Brazil	Editora Schwarcz S/A	
Brazil	Editorial 5 / ED5	
Brazil	Elsevier Editora Ltda	
Brazil	GEN – Grupo Editorial Nacional Participação S/A	
Brazil	GMT Editores Ltda	
Brazil	Imago Editora Importação e Exportação Ltda	
Brazil	J.E. Solomon Editores Ltda	
Brazil	Jorge Zahar Editor Ltda	
Brazil	Livraria do Advogado Ltda	
Brazil	LTC – Livros Técnicos e Científicos Editora Ltda	
Brazil	National Union of Book Publishers	
Brazil	NC Editora Ltda	
Brazil	Pallas Editora e Distribuidora Ltda	
Brazil	Petra Editorial Ltda	
Brazil	Pinto e Zincone Editora Ltda	
Brazil	Publibook Livros e Papéis Ltda	
Brazil	Saber e Ler Editorial Ltda	
Brazil	Sociedade Literária Edições e Empreendimentos Ltda	
Brazil	Starlin Alta Editora e Consultoria EIRELI	
Brazil	Summus Editorial Ltda	
Brazil	Verus Editora Ltda	
Canada	House of Anansi Press	
Canada	Invisible Publishing	
Canada	J. Gordon Shillingford Publishing	
Canada	Signature Editions	
Canada	Book*hug Press	
Canada	Cormorant Books	
Canada	Guernica Editions	
Canada	ECW Press	
Canada	Studio C1C4	
Colombia	Editorial El Manual Moderno Colombia S.A.S.	
Colombia	Santillana Colombia	
Egypt	Al-Balsam Publishing House	
France	Hachette Livre	
France	Groupe Editis	
Georgia	Artanuji Publishing	
Georgia	Bakur Sulakauri Publishing	
Georgia	Intelekti Publishing	
Germany	Verlag Barbara Budrich	
India	PHI Learning Private Limited	
India	Chennai Publishing Services	
Italy	Edizioni Piemme	
Italy	Giulio Einaudi Editore	
Italy	Sperling & Kupfer	
Japan	Discover 21, Inc.	
Jordan	Al Salwa Publishers	
Mexico	Editorial el Manual Moderno, S.A. de C.V.	
Mexico	Penguin Random House Grupo Editorial México	
Mexico	Santillana México	
Mexico	SM México	
Mexico	Constantine Editores	
Mexico	Editorial Mango Manila	
Mexico	Editorial Sélector	
Netherlands	AMN	
Netherlands	Gottmer Uitgevers Groep	
Netherlands	Singel Uitgeverijen	
Netherlands	ThiemeMeulenhoff	
Netherlands	Veen Bosch & Keuning Uitgeversgroep B.V.	
New Zealand	Oratia Media	
Nigeria	Nigerian Publishers Association	
Nigeria	Books and Gavel	
Nigeria	Rasmed Publications	
Nigeria	Evans Brothers Nigeria Publishers Limited	
Nigeria	West African Book Publishers LTD	
Nigeria	Babcock University Press	
Saudi Arabia	Kadi and Ramadi	
South Africa	New Africa Books	
South Africa	Wits University Press	
Spain	Planeta de Libros	
Spain	Santillana Educación S.L.	
Thailand	Silkworm Books Ltd	
United Arab Emirates	Al Fulk Translation and Publishing	
United Arab Emirates	Al Fulk Translation and Publishing (United Arab Emirates)	
United Arab Emirates	Dar Al Aalam Al Arabi Publishing and Distribution	
United Arab Emirates	Hudhud Publishing and Distribution	
United Arab Emirates	Kalimat Group	
United Arab Emirates	Sama Publishing, Production and Distribution	
United Arab Emirates	Wahat Alhekayat Publishing and Distribution	
United Arab Emirates	Waw Publishing	
United Kingdom	Bloomsbury Publishing Plc	
United Kingdom	Bristol University Press	
United Kingdom	British Dyslexia Association	
United Kingdom	Elsevier	
United Kingdom	Kogan Page	
United Kingdom	SAGE Publications Ltd	
United Kingdom	HarperCollins Publishers	
United Kingdom	Taylor & Francis Group	
United Kingdom	Cambridge University Press & Assessment	
United States of America	Macmillan Learning	
WIPO		

== Accessible Books Consortium advisory board members ==
The ABC has an advisory board which provides technical expertise, transparency and communication with stakeholders. Its members are:

- African Union for the Blind
- Blind Citizens of New Zealand
- DAISY Consortium
- Dedicon
- eBound Canada
- Government of Australia
- International Authors Forum (IAF)
- International Council for Education of People with Visual Impairment
- International Federation of Library Associations and Institutions (IFLA)
- International Federation of Reproduction Rights Organisations (IFRRO)
- International Publishers Association (IPA)
- Manual Moderno
- Sao Mai Vocational and Assistive Technology Center for the Blind
- World Blind Union (WBU)
- World Intellectual Property Organization
