= Accessible publishing =

Approach to publishing and book design

An example of someone using a screen reader showing documents that are inaccessible, readable and accessible

Accessible publishing is an approach to publishing and book design whereby books and other texts are made available in alternative formats designed to aid or replace the reading process. It is particularly relevant for people who are blind, visually impaired or otherwise print-disabled.

Alternative formats that have been developed to aid different people to read include varieties of larger fonts, specialised fonts for certain kinds of reading disabilities, braille, e-books, and automated audiobooks and DAISY digital talking books.

Accessible publishing has been made easier through developments in technology such as print on demand (POD), e-book readers, the XML structured data format, the EPUB3 format and the Internet.

== Aim ==
The aim of accessible publishing is to make reading easier for those who have difficulties doing so. This group includes people who are blind or who have low vision, people with learning disabilities, and people who are learning a second language. Accessible publishing also aims to allow people to read any book in whichever format allows them to read fastest or allows them to absorb the information in a better way.

Guidelines and techniques for publishing in accessible formats have been made available by several organisations and authors, including:

- EDItEUR: "Accessible Publishing – Best Practice Guidelines for Publishers".
- Matt Garrish: "Accessible EPUB 3" (freely available chapter from EPUB 3 Best Practices by Matt Garrish and Markus Gylling, O'Reilly, 2013).
- "Accessible Digital Media Guidelines" by the National Center for Accessible Media (NCAM).
- "Making PDF files accessible: guidelines for the DTP creation phase" by AcceDe PDF.

== History ==
Before the 21st century, the publishing industry focused on the production of printed books. The predominant publishing theory, which stressed economy of scale, tended to make only one format of a given book available. In this way they could be mass-produced and made available for the general public. This model did not allow for any other format to be widely available, however.

There were a number of developments in technology that increased the accessibility of books. The first of these was the development of the braille writing system by Louis Braille in 1821. Then there was the development of audiobooks which originated from the United States Congress in 1931 and became popularised by advances in recording and the use of voice actors.

In 1980, Thorndike Press came into existence as a republisher of large-print books. Thorndike bought the rights for large print versions of books from publishers and then republished them in a larger and more accessible format for people with reading difficulties.

== Recent developments ==
New portable readers, such as the Victor Reader products and the Plextalk Pocket handle talking books in a wide variety of formats including DAISY Digital Talking Book, MP3, text only, and many others.

New technology, such as introduced in the Sony Reader of 2004 and Amazon's Kindle in 2007, provided the ability to alter the size of the font automatically.

ReadHowYouWant is another leader in developing this technology. It works in partnership with publishers to make books available in all formats all across the world. This includes specially designed fonts for dyslexia, macular degeneration and line tracking problems.

== See also ==
- Audiobook
- Braille translator
- Computer accessibility
- DAISY Digital Talking Book
- Readability
- Tactile alphabets for the blind
- Web accessibility
- Web Content Accessibility Guidelines

Accessible publishers:

- BookShare
- German Central Library for the Blind
- Learning Ally, previously named Recording for the Blind & Dyslexic
- National Library Service for the Blind and Physically Handicapped
- Washington Talking Book & Braille Library
- West German Audio Book Library for the Blind
