= DFI (disambiguation) =

DFI, or Diamond Flower Inc., is a motherboard manufacturer based in Taiwan.

DFI may also refer to:

== Organizations ==
- DAISY Forum of India
- Danish Film Institute
- DDR PHY Interface (DFI)
- Deep Foundations Institute
- Department for Infrastructure (Northern Ireland)
- Deutsch-Französisches Institut, German for the Franco-German Institute in Ludwigsburg
- Deutsch-Französisches Institut, a French-language institute in Erlangen
- Development finance institution, risk capital provider
- Development Fund for Iraq
- Division of Field Investigations, criminal investigations arm of New York Department of Motor Vehicles
- Doha Film Institute
- Drøbak-Frogn IL, a Norwegian sports club

== Other ==
- DFI Retail Group, a pan-Asian retail company based in Hong Kong
- Dietary fructose malabsorption
