= Chakshumathi =

Indian non-profit organization

Chakshumathi is a nongovernmental, not for profit organization based in Thiruvananthapuram, Kerala, India, working for developing resources for the use of visually impaired people. It is an "Empowerment and Assistive Technology Centre for Blind". The organization, which was inaugurated in June 2011, is a member of DAISY Forum of India. The organization is currently headed by V.K. Damodaran, a former President of Kerala Sasthra Sahithya Parishad.

The organization is engaged in the following activities:

- Publication of textbooks and other books for general reading in the DAISY standard.
- Publication of a fortnightly in Malayalam in the DAISY standard.
- Making available to visually impaired persons books in DAISY standard from libraries throughout the world.
- Organising workshops on assistive technologies for the visually impaired.
- Providing training in the production of books and other materials in DAISY standard.
- Giving job training to visually impaired persons to help them engage in economically productive activities.

== History ==
In September 2011, Chakshumathi, a charitable trust constituted to empower blind people and those with visual impairments through the aid of latest technologies, inaugurated its Kochi centre. S. P. Balasubramaniam enthralled, inspired and energised in a three-hour inaugural concert attended by other important dignitaries at the Kerala Fine Arts Hall. The organisation plans to provide Daisy Training and library service of over 24,000 additional books in Daisy format to people with visual impairments for free.

In May 2020, as part of the global initiative—Lets FICE(Let's Flatten inaccessibility curve) — to cover the inaccessibility curve in the education of students with blindness, low vision and print disability, the NGO had launched a 60-day worldwide online training programme for students of visually impaired and several students from across the globe including Pakistan, Bangladesh, Nepal, Sri Lanka, Europe, Africa, Caribbean islands and other continents have enrolled for the online programme launched with the support of engineers and developers working at Google, BookShare, University of Birmingham, Progressive Access, IIT Delhi and Daisy Forum of India. The basic objective of programme is to popularise the importance of assistive technologies in the education and everyday life of visually impaired and print disabled students and first batch has around 50 participants with sessions being planned in English and the participants should have basic knowledge of computer and mobile phones. The course will help visually disabled and print disabled students to get tutored and master the techniques of using computers and smartphones and use them to learn science and mathematics within 60 days.

In 2019, it conducted a five-day programme, 'Eyes free science summer camp' for visually impaired students at Vakkom Maulavi Foundation Trust at Thekumoodu, to dispel the myth that the blind or those with visual impairment cannot study mathematics or science. Through these programmes students are able to work in science and technology professions and many are pursuing higher studies in science and technology streams and excel their sighted peers as the training had broken the barriers of mindset of the students and their families and is free for visually impaired students from standard 7 to 10.
