= Kalimat Foundation =

Charitable arm of UAE publisher Kalimat Group

Kalimat Foundation is a non-profit organization based in Sharjah, United Arab Emirates. Its mission is to provide books and reading materials to children in need and promote a culture of reading among them. The Foundation is the charitable arm of Kalimat Group, a publisher in the United Arab Emirates, with international partnerships including Britain's Bloomsbury and France's Gallimard Jeunesse. The organisation's founder and chairperson is Bodour Al Qasimi, President of the American University of Sharjah, past President of the International Publishers Association (2021 - 2022).

== History ==
The foundation was established in 2016 by Her Excellency Sheikha Bodour bint Sultan Al Qasimi, a member of the ruling family of Sharjah, who is a strong advocate for education and literacy. Kalimat Foundation works in partnership with various organizations, schools, and libraries to distribute books to underprivileged children and refugees in different countries.

== Programmes and partnerships ==
Established in 2016, Kalimat Foundation's objective has been to encourage literacy particularly for youngsters in Arabic-speaking communities. Its Pledge a Library programme was launched in November 2017 with an aim of distributing books to children fleeing conflict in Middle Eastern states. More recently the campaign has extended to Arabic speaking communities in East and West Africa, as a result of partnership in June 2021 with Book Aid International in the United Kingdom.

The foundation's Ara initiative was launched in 2017 to make accessible book formats available, supporting objectives set in the 2013 Marrakesh VIP Treaty. In November 2018 a partnership agreement was signed with the Accessible Books Consortium to aid the production of born-accessible books in Arabic. More recently, in 2022, the foundation received license by the UAE Ministry of Economy and authorisation by the World Intellectual Property Organization, to publish literary works in accessible formats, without contravening copyright laws.
