= Books for the Blind =

US program providing audiobooks to the visually impaired

The Books for the Blind Program is an initiative of the United States National Library Service for the Blind and Physically Handicapped (NLS) which provides audio recordings of books free of charge to people who are blind or visually impaired. The program has included audio recordings of books since 1934 and digital book efforts began in 1996.

== History ==
See also National Library Service for the Blind and Physically Handicapped

In 1931, the United States passed the Pratt-Smoot Act to provide blind adults with access to books. Before audio recordings, books were made available in braille. Beginning with 19 libraries in 1931, the network as of March 2018 was 55 regional libraries, 32 subregional libraries, and 14 advisory and outreach centers serving the United States and its territories. The program was expanded in 1952 to include blind children, in 1962 to include music materials, and in 1966 to include individuals with physical impairments that prevent the reading of standard print. The Books for the Blind Program was the model for the effort in the 1950s for captioned films for the deaf leading to the Captioned Films Act of 1958.

Audio recordings were first created on vinyl when the Pratt-Smoot Act was amended in 1933 to include "talking books", and later, in 1969, on proprietary cassette tape and player, becoming the preferred format. Currently, books for the blind and visually impaired can be downloaded from the NLS's Braille and Audio Reading Download (BARD) system, which allows for digital books on desktop computers and some mobile devices. In 2016, a Wi-Fi symbol was added to the NLS's logo to represent the inclusion of wireless connectivity to the programs.

== See also ==
- Audiobook
- West German Audio Book Library for the Blind
- National Library Service for the Blind and Physically Handicapped
- DAISY Digital Talking Book
