= Nota (library) =

Danish library for those with print disabilities

- Nationalbibliotek for mennesker med læsevanskeligheder
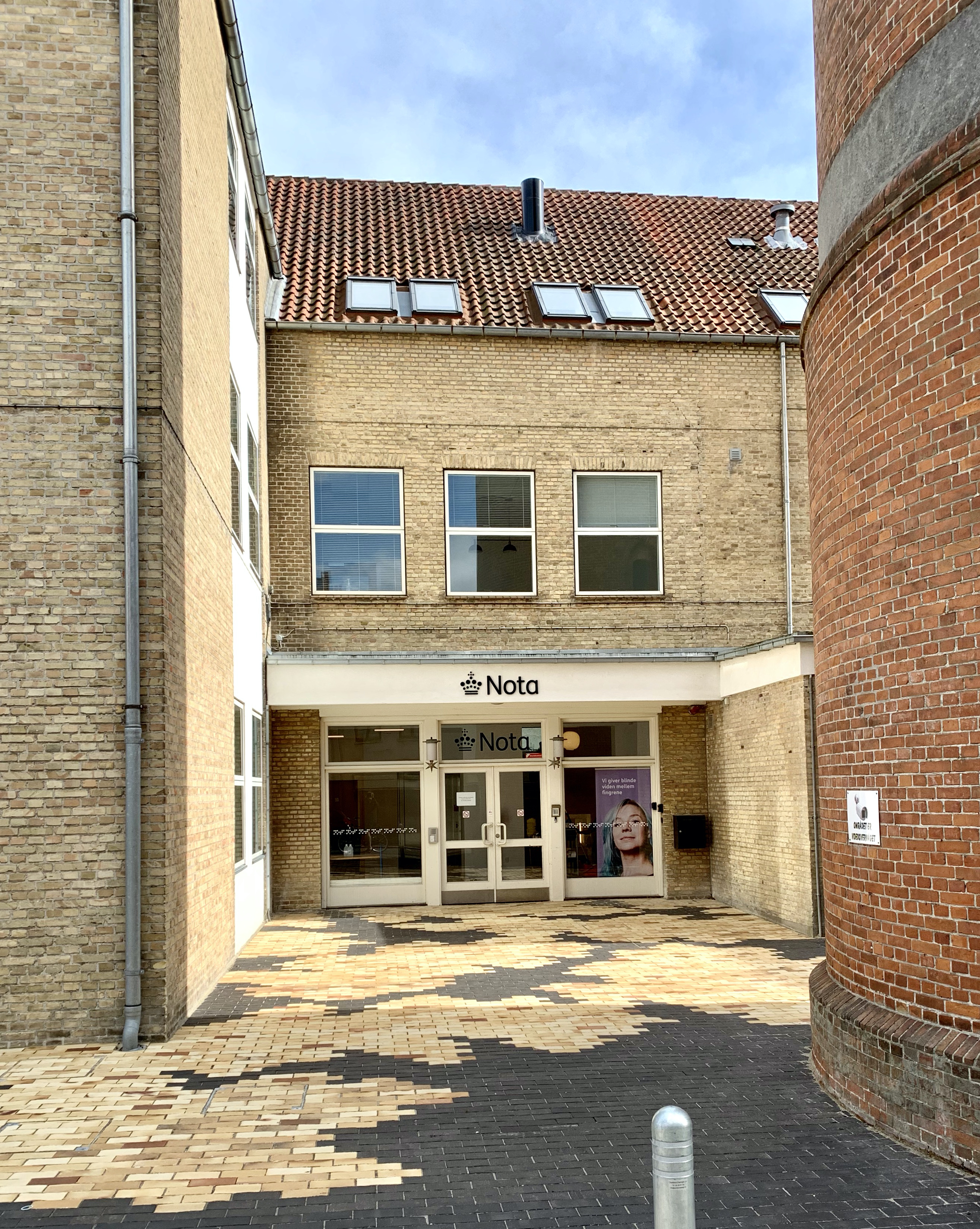
- Formation: 1924; 102 years ago
- Headquarters: Nakskov, Denmark
- Website: https://www.nota.dk/
- Formerly called: Statens Trykkeri og Bibliotek for Blinde, Danmarks Blindebibliotek

Nota, or the Danish Library and Expertise Center for people with print disabilities (Danish: Nationalbibliotek for mennesker med læsevanskeligheder), is a state-run library under the Danish Ministry of Culture that produces audiobooks, e-books and Braille books for people who cannot read ordinary printed text. The organization is headquartered in Nakskov, Denmark.

== History ==
The Danish Print Shop and Library for the Blind was founded in 1924 (Danish: Statens Trykkeri og Bibliotek for Blinde) as a department of the Danish Royal Institute for the Blind. The library was later to become part of the Ministry of Culture in 1985. Changes took place at that time, with trained librarians being hired. Over time, the organization's focus shifted from printing material for the blind and visually impaired to becoming a library. In 2009, the library changed its name from Danmarks Blindebibliotek ('the Danish Library for the Blind') to Nota as it aims to provide resources not only for the blind and visually impaired, but also those with reading disabilities.

== Online library ==
Nota's online library has over 50,000 e-books, audiobooks, and Braille books. Nota members can also play audiobooks directly from Nota's player on their computer, mobile phone, or tablet. Local newspapers and national newspapers are also available in an accessible format. Nota is a member of the DAISY Consortium, an organization which maintains the DAISY (Digital Accessible Information System) technical standard for accessible materials.

== Nordic cooperation ==
Nota cooperates with similar agencies in the Nordic countries: the Norwegian Library of Talking Books and Braille; the Swedish Agency for Accessible Media; the Finnish library for accessible text, Celia; and the Icelandic Hljóðbókasafns Íslands. An agreement was signed in 2009 which allows accessible literature to be shared between these countries. The agreement increases user access and also eliminates unnecessary duplication of work in creating accessible versions.

== Registration and users ==
It is free to join Nota. To be registered, one must have a documented visual impairment or reading disability. Nota members' reading disabilities are typically dyslexia and visual impairment, but there are also members with cognitive disabilities and physical disabilities.

Nota's dyslexic users are typically enrolled by a reading tutor or reading consultant, while blind users are enrolled by vision consultants or ophthalmologists. The third user group is people with other disabilities. Often they are registered by their general practitioner or a specialist. In addition, educators of Nota members – for example, primary school teachers – can access Nota materials in the context of teaching Nota members. Relatives, librarians or others who help Nota users to order and download books can join Nota as assistants and thus have access to order books on behalf of the member.

== Studies on reading difficulties ==
In addition to being a library, Nota is also a knowledge centre. Nota produces various studies dealing with different topics related to reading difficulties. Nota also collaborates with other institutions, for example through the "Project School" (Projektskolen) initiative, where Nota invites students from different universities to develop knowledge in collaboration with Nota.

== See also ==
- Scandinavian Braille
- List of libraries in Denmark
