= Benetech =

American non-profit organization

- Founded: 1989, 2001 under Benetech name
- Founder: Jim Fruchterman
- Type: Non-profit
- Purpose: Education, Human Rights, Environment, Poverty
- Location: Palo Alto, California United States
- Region served: Worldwide
- Product: Software for social good
- Key people: Jim Fruchterman (Founder), Ayan Kishore (CEO), Kevin Lo (Chair)
- Website: Benetech.org
- Formerly called: Arkenstone, Inc.

Benetech is a nonprofit social enterprise organization that empowers communities with software for social good. Previous projects include the Route 66 Literacy Project, the Miradi environmental project management software, Martus (human rights abuse reporting), and the Human Rights Data Analysis Group. Current program areas include global education, human rights, and poverty alleviation.

== About ==
One of Benetech's key education program initiatives is Bookshare, an e-book library for people with print disabilities such as dyslexia, blindness, low vision, and physical disabilities.

Another project is Benetech Service Net, an open standards data exchange platform that makes it easier to share and maintain information on local social and human services. Organizations providing referrals or referral technology (such as 2-1-1s, Healthify, or Health Leads) and agencies providing information about their services (such as community-based shelters, food pantries, or government agencies) can work together to make better data available for everyone.

== History ==
Benetech was founded by technology entrepreneur Jim Fruchterman in Palo Alto, California, under the name of Arkenstone in 1989. It was initially created to provide reading machines for blind people. During the period 1989–2000, over 35,000 reading machines were sold in sixty countries, reading twelve different languages. In 2000, the Arkenstone reading machine product line was sold to Freedom Scientific, and the nonprofit's name was changed to Benetech. The funding from the asset sale was used to start the Bookshare initiative and Martus project in 2001.

Benetech and its Martus software were featured on the PBS NewsHour.

In 2019, Benetech announced the expansion of its inclusive education initiatives, creating new partnerships with organisations such as Vision Australia, the Royal National Institute of Blind People in the UK, National Council for the Blind of Ireland, Canada's Center for Equitable Library Access and the Dubai government.

== See also ==
- Guatemala National Police Archives
