= Norwegian Library of Talking Books and Braille =

Public library organization in Norway

- Norsk lyd- og blindeskriftbibliotek
- Location: Oslo, Norway

Collection
- Size: 18,000 audiobooks and 7400 braille books

The Norwegian Library of Talking Books and Braille (Norwegian: Norsk lyd- og blindeskriftbibliotek, NLB) is a public library organization based in Oslo, Norway. It produces and loans out audiobooks and braille books. Its services are aimed at people who have difficulty reading printed texts, for example because of dyslexia, visual impairment or other disabilities which making reading difficult. The library serves users across the whole country and the service is free of charge. Audiobooks are sent free by post on CD and can also be downloaded or streamed from the library's website. Users can also use the library's Lydhør app to listen to audiobooks on smartphones or tablets. The library is Norway's largest producers of audiobooks and braille books. In 2014, its collection was made up of 18,000 audiobooks and 7400 braille books. The library also produces and loans out study materials for students with difficulties reading printed texts. Norwegian law permits the library to produce audio books and braille books from material subject to copyright. The library has about 29,000 users.

== History ==
The Norwegian Association of the Blind (Norges Blindeforbund) established the country's first braille library in Bergen in 1910. Further branches were opened in Oslo (1913) and Trondheim (1916). The association owned and ran the libraries until 1989, when responsibility for supplying library services to those with visual impairment and reading difficulties was transferred to the state in the form of the Ministry of Culture. The library's offices in Bergen and Trondheim were closed in 2007. All production and loaning activities now take place from the library's premises in Oslo.

== Organisation ==
The library had 55 employees in 2014. A further 40 people are employed as narrators. Øyvind Engh is the library's director. Members of the library's board, currently headed by Trygve Nordby, are appointed by the Department of Culture.

== Library services ==
The library is both a public library and an academic library. Registered users have access to the entire collection. The collections holds both works of fiction and non-fiction aimed at adults, young people and children. It also holds magazines and newspapers. People with visual impairment are entitled to have works they require produced. Students with dyslexia or other reading difficulties may borrow audiobooks which have already been produced by the library or other libraries in other countries which the library cooperates with.

Users can search for materials on the library's website, from where registered users can either download or stream content. They can also listen to content using the library's Lydhør app.

The library provides services to anyone who can document that they have difficulties reading printed text. To register with the library, users have to provide a document signed by a competent person (for example a doctor, teacher, nurse, or speech-language pathologist) which confirms that the user needs access to the library's materials. Users already registered as blind or partially sighted with the Norwegian Association of the Blind do not have to provide such a document. Schools with schoolchildren who have reading difficulties may also borrow materials, as do institutions with users who have reading difficulties. Such schools or institutions are registered as users through a contact person.

== Audiobooks ==
Audiobooks produced by the library are recorded by professional narrators at the library's studios. The library also purchases audiobooks produced by commercial publishers. The books are transferred to DAISY format before being loaned out. DAISY is a digital format which makes it possible to navigate through an audiobook in a similar fashion to a printed book. To be able to use all the features of a DAISY book, users are recommended to use a DAISY player or to use the EasyReader Express PC software which is on all the library's audiobooks. The audio files of DAISY books are in mp3 format. The books can also be listened to any MP3 player, but with reduced navigation capabilities. Users with visual impairment can borrow DAISY players from the Norwegian county administration where they live. In 2008, the state and copyright holders signed a new audiobook agreement. The agreement allows the library to lend an unlimited number of copies of materials produced by the library itself, so that there are never waiting lists for such materials.

== Speech synthesis ==
An increasing number of books are produced using speech synthesis. Around 80% of study materials and most audio editions of magazines and newspapers are produced using speech synthesis. Audiobooks produced using speech synthesis are also available as full text books, which means they can be read on a PC at the same time as being listened to. The library launched speech synthesis software called Brage in 2009. The software was co-developed with the equivalent library in Sweden and builds on the resources of Norway's Språkbank ('language bank'), a collection of digitized language resources.

== Partners ==
The library cooperates with special interest groups and others who are in contact with the library's users.

== DAISY Consortium and the Norwegian DAISY consortium ==
The library is represented on the board of DAISY Consortium (DC), which is of significant importance to the library's work. In 2006 the library initiated the setting up of the Norwegian DAISY consortium (Norsk DAISY-konsortium, often referred to as simply NDK). The Norwegian DAISY consortium is a member of the international DC and is made up of various Norwegian organisations dealing with sight impairment such as Norwegian State Special Pedagogical Services, the Norwegian Association of the Blind and the library itself.

== International Federation of Library Associations and Institutions (IFLA) ==
The library is a member of the Standing Committee of the IFLA section called Libraries Services Persons with Print Disabilities. The section's main work involves ensuring that people with sight impairment and reading difficulties get the same access to library services as others. The library is also a participant in the TIGAR project, in which the IFLA section works with the DAISY Consortium. The project aims to ensure that those with sight impairment or reading difficulties have access to the literature they desire in digital form, regardless of where they are in the world. International cooperation agreements and file exchanges are to ensure the access.

== Nordic cooperation ==
The library cooperates with similar libraries in the Nordic region: Nota in Denmark, the Swedish Agency for Accessible Media in Sweden, Hljóðbókasafn Íslands in Iceland and Celia in Finland. In the autumn of 2009 the libraries signed an agreement to exchange their materials across borders. The agreement covers both completed productions and access to files needed to produce literature in the desired format. It increases the amount of material available to users and contributes to a reduction of unnecessary duplicate productions. The agreement also makes it possible for users living in the region to borrow materials from other Nordic countries.

== See also ==
- West German Audio Book Library for the Blind
- List of libraries in Norway
