= Braille Challenge =

Braille literacy competition

The Braille Challenge is an annual two-stage Braille literacy competition designed to motivate blind students to emphasize their study of Braille. The program parallels with the importance and educational purpose of a spelling bee for sighted children. Braille is a reading and writing method that breaks language into a code of raised dots. There are three grades of braille:

- Grade 1, which consists of the 26 standard letters of the alphabet and punctuation.
  - This grade of braille is only used by people who are first starting to read Braille.
- Grade 2, which consists of the 26 standard letters of the alphabet, punctuation and contractions.
  - In this grade of braille contractions are used to save space. A normal Braille page cannot fit as much text as a standard printed page. Books, signs in public places, menus, and most other Braille materials are written in Grade 2 Braille.
- Grade 3, which is used only in personal letters, diaries, and notes.
  - This grade is a type of shorthand that shortens entire words to a few letters.

The Braille Challenge started locally in 2000 sponsored by Braille Institute to help encourage and promote students’ braille skills. In 2003 Braille Institute began partnering with other organizations and formed an advisory committee in order to make the Braille Challenge accessible to all kids across the United States and Canada. Two hundred students from twenty-eight states and four Canadian provinces traveled to participate in the regional events, sending fifty-five finalists to Los Angeles to compete for the 2003 Braille Challenge title. Participation in the contest has doubled since 2003. By 2005 the institute received 775 requests for the preliminary contest, representing students from forty states and six Canadian provinces.

In 2009, thirty-one blind service agencies and schools for the blind and visually impaired throughout the United States and Canada hosted regional events. Over five hundred students participated regionally in 2009, and the national top twelve scores in each of the five age groups competed nationally at the final round held at the Braille Institute in Los Angeles on June 20, 2009.

In 2016, the Braille Challenge finals were held in Los Angeles on June 17–18.

== Regional competitions ==
Regional events offer parent workshops, entertainment, speakers, and adaptive technology demonstrations. The regional contests give parents of blind children the opportunity to meet other blind students and parents, and also gives students the opportunity to experience performing in a live competition as well as receive acknowledgement for the hard work they put into preparing for the event. The process builds community awareness about the importance of braille literacy.

== Contest categories and sample questions ==
The Braille Challenge includes four categories, each lasting fifty minutes. Students with the top twelve scores nationally in each of the five age groups advance to the Final Round in June, held at the Braille Institute in Los Angeles. Following the final 2009 competition, an awards ceremony will be held at the Universal Hilton Hotel. The first through third place winners in each age group receive a savings bond, ranging in value from $500 for the youngest group, to $5,000 for the oldest. In addition to these prizes, Freedom Scientific has donated the latest adaptive equipment for the winners—a pocket PC with a braille display called a PacMate.

Braille Speed and Accuracy

In this event, contestants listen to a tape-recorded story and must transcribe it into braille. Contestants are ranked from lowest to highest, based on the number of correct words (including punctuation) they transcribe from the page. A point is subtracted for each word that contains one or more mistakes, including missing or extra words. Students can download sample contest questions for each level formatted as MP3 files from the Braille Challenge website.

Braille Spelling

Contestants are asked to spell braille vocabulary words correctly. Points are earned for each correctly spelled word. Extra points are given for additionally brailling the contracted version of the word correctly. Sample contests are formatted as generic BRF files, which can be opened in any of the commonly used braille translation software programs and then output on the students own braille embosser. They can also download text versions of each of the sample contests in PDF format.

Chart and Graph Reading

Contestants read raised-line images called tactile graphs and earn points by correctly answering a series of multiple-choice questions about the content. Contestants are ranked based on the most points earned. Both Braille and text versions are available online at the Braille Challenge website.

Proofreading

Contestants read a series of braille sentences, some with grammar, punctuation or spelling errors. Contestant are asked to choose the multiple-choice option that is brailled correctly.

Reading Comprehension

Contestants read a story in braille to themselves and then answer 10 multiple-choice questions. Based on the content, contestants are ranked in order based on the number of questions they can answer correctly.
