= DZB =

DZB may refer to:

- German Central Library for the Blind (Deutsche Zentralbücherei für Blinde) in Leipzig, Germany
- XerxesDZB, a Dutch football club in Rotterdam, Netherlands
