= Ministry of Culture (Denmark) =

Government ministry of Denmark

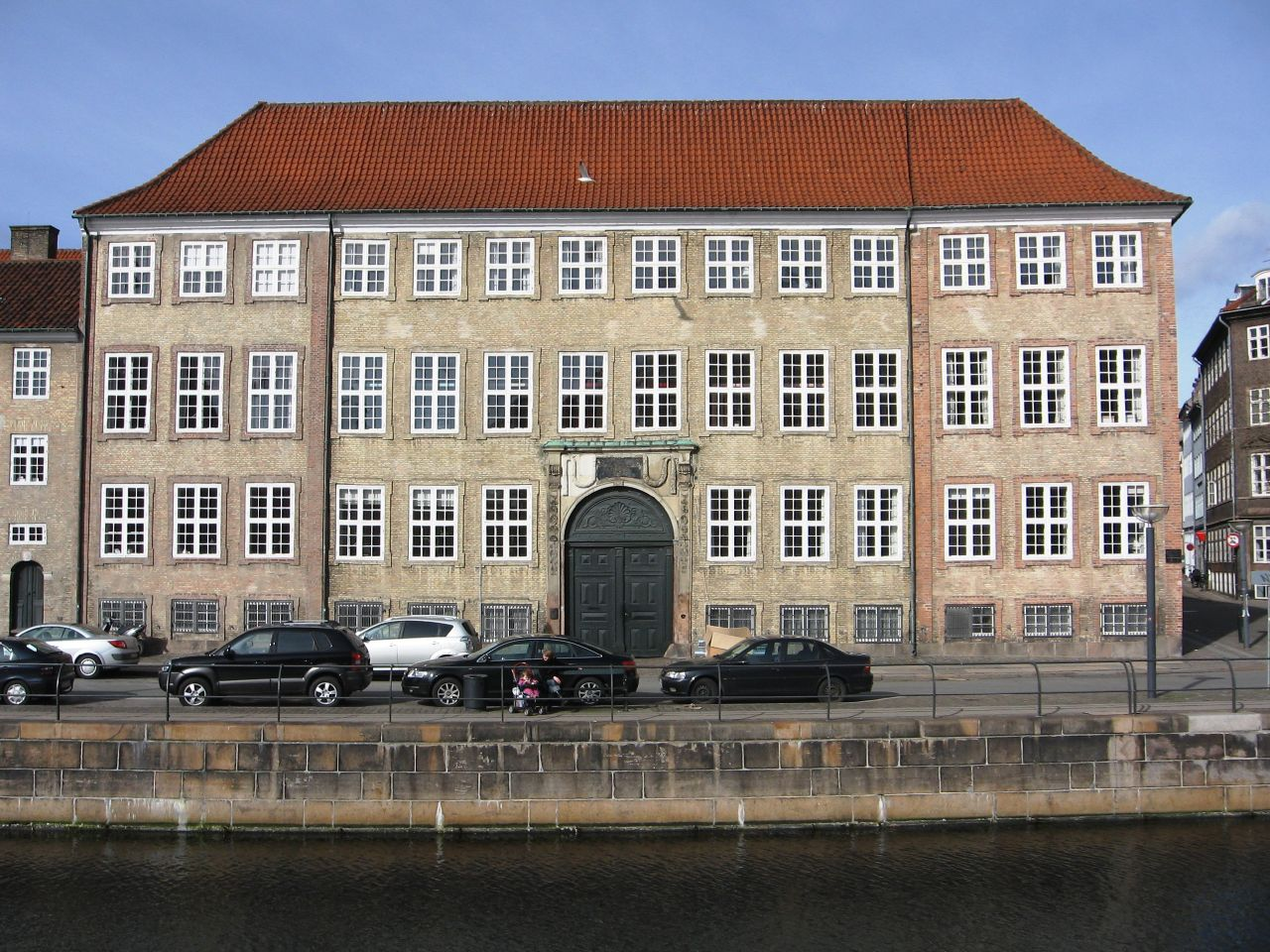
Headquarters of The Ministry of Culture Denmark

The Ministry of Culture Denmark (Danish: Kulturministeriet) is a ministry of the Danish Government, with responsibility for culture, sport and media.

== History ==
The Ministry is located at Gammel Strand on Nybrogade opposite Slotsholmen. Originally, it was a three-winged building. Its construction started in 1729. In 1765, it was expanded with the complex with a new wing facing the canal which was designed was added by architect Philip de Lange (c. 1705-1766). The building served from 1759 to c. 1950 as site of the Royal Pawn (Det Kongelige Assistenshus).

The Danish Ministry of Culture was founded in 1961 with Julius Bomholt as its first minister. In 1962, the ministry moved in after the building had undergone a thorough restoration.

== Agencies and institutions ==
=== Agencies ===
- Danish Heritage Agency
- Danish Arts Foundation (Statens Kunstfond)
- Agency for Culture and Palaces
- Nota Library and Expertise Center for people with print disabilities

=== Educational institutions ===
- Royal Danish Academy of Fine Arts
- National Film School of Denmark
- Royal Danish Theatre's School of Ballet
- Danish Design School
- Royal School of Library and Information Science
- Royal Academy of Music, Aarhus/Aalborg
- Rhythmic Music Conservatory
- Forfatterskolen

=== Associated institutions ===
- Royal Danish Library
- Skibsbevaringsfonden

== See also ==
- List of Danish government ministries
- Minister for Culture
