= Atkinson Hyperlegible =

Grotesque sans-serif typeface

- Category: Sans-serif
- Classification: Grotesque
- Designer: Applied Design Works
- Foundry: Braille Institute
- Date created: 2019
- License: SIL Open Font License
- Website: brailleinstitute.org/freefont

Atkinson Hyperlegible is a freely available typeface built around a grotesque sans-serif core, intended to be optimally legible for readers who are partially visually impaired, with all characters maximally distinguishable from one another. It was developed by the Braille Institute of America in collaboration with Applied Design Works and is available under the SIL Open Font License. It won Fast Company's Innovation by Design Award for Graphic Design in 2019 and was shortlisted for a graphic design award by Dezeen in 2020.

In 2025, the Braille Institute released Atkinson Hyperlegible Next, an enhanced version of the font with variable weight and an expanded character set to support more languages, along with a monospaced version.

== History ==
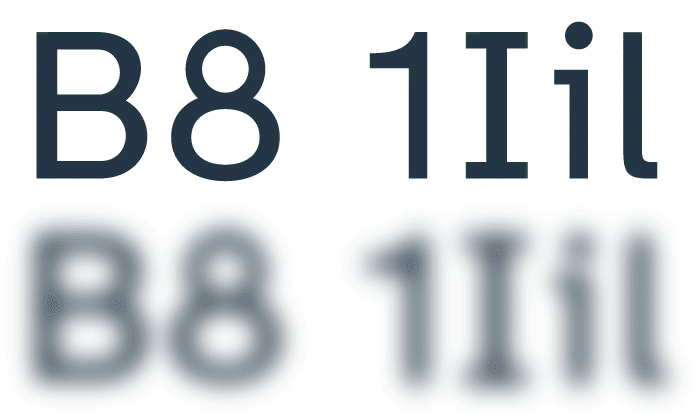
The font's normal appearance above, and a blur effect simulating how the same letters might appear to someone with a low-vision condition below

The project began as part of a visual rebranding at the Braille Institute, which contracted the studio Applied Design Works to work with a specialist in low-vision conditions from the Braille Institute and a panel of people with such conditions. Most students that the Braille Institute works with are not fully blind and do not use braille, the tactile writing system with which the institute shares its name. Applied Design Works looked for a typeface that would suit the Braille Institute's needs but were unable to find one. Experimenting with both serif and sans-serif fonts including Times New Roman and Frutiger, they found that distinguishing among homoglyphs, and even among some characters that do not appear very similar to fully sighted people, was difficult for partially visually impaired people because of these fonts' focus on uniformity. Thus the project shifted to creating a typeface that would prioritize legibility for the community the Braille Institute serves.

Applied Design Works' creative director, Craig Dobie, put Elliott Scott in charge of designing the typeface. Building around a grotesque sans-serif core, the Applied Designs Works team worked to make sure that none of the typeface's glyphs could be mistaken for any other, consulting with clients of the Braille Institute and familiarizing themselves with research into legibility. The Braille Institute named the finished product after the institute's founder, J. Robert Atkinson, and released it on its website through a custom license; in 2021, they made it available through Google Fonts under the SIL Open Font License.

In 2019, Atkinson Hyperlegible won Fast Company's Innovation by Design Award for Graphic Design. The next year, it was shortlisted for a graphic design award by Dezeen, losing to a series of heat-reactive stamps that illustrate climate change.

In 2025, the Braille Institute released Atkinson Hyperlegible Next, an enhanced version of the font with variable weight and an expanded character set to support more languages, along with a monospaced version.

Since July 2025, Atkinson Hyperlegible is used on the platform displays of the Munich U-Bahn (the rapid transit network in Munich, Germany), as well as the packaging and website for the brand Tilt Beauty (a makeup and beauty company that prioritizes accessibility).

== Design ==
Atkinson Hyperlegible contains four styles, each of 335 glyphs: regular, bold, italics, and italics bold. It supports diacritics in 27 languages.

Elliott Scott of Applied Design Works and studio creative director Craig Dobie made the decision "to break a lot of rules that a lot of designers will care about", for instance adding serifs to the uppercase i but not the uppercase tee and giving the uppercase ef a significantly longer tie (middle bar) than the uppercase e. Mark Wilson of Fast Company writes:

Stare too long at its quirks, and Atkinson Hyperlegible almost feels like it has an identity crisis, as if a dozen fonts were smashed together to make one. But typed out on a page, it's been treated with careful kerning that the average eye just kind of accepts, as if it was any other typeface.

Other efforts to make letters distinct include exaggerating letters' shapes and angling their spurs. There are many circles in Atkinson Hyperlegible, a nod to braille dots and the Braille Institute.

== See also ==
- Comic Sans
- Dyslexie
