= Swedish Agency for Accessible Media =

Swedish administrative authority

- Myndigheten för tillgängliga medier (Swedish)
- Abbreviation: MTM
- Predecessor: Audiobook and Braille Library
- Formation: 1 January 2020
- Location: Malmö, Sweden
- Parent organization: Ministry of Culture
- Website: Official website

The Swedish Agency for Accessible Media (Swedish: Myndigheten för tillgängliga medier, MTM), formerly the Audiobook and Braille Library (Talboks- och punktskriftsbiblioteket, TPB), is a Swedish governmental administrative agency under the Ministry of Culture.

The agency's task is to work in collaboration with other libraries in the country to ensure that everyone has access to literature and social information based on their own abilities, regardless of reading ability or disability, and to make easy-read literature available. For example, the agency must ensure that people with reading and writing difficulties/dyslexia and visual impairments have access to literature in media adapted for them: audiobooks, Braille books, tactile picture books and e-books. All audiobooks are made in DAISY format. DAISY stands for Digital Accessible Information System and is an open, internationally established standard. In addition to cooperation with other area libraries on lending accessible media, the agency also has its own program to lend Braille books. It is also working on developing technology for media for people with reading disabilities.

The available books and newspapers are downloaded from the agency's digital library Legimus. In March 2016, there were over 100,000 audiobooks, more than 18,000 Braille titles, around 3,000 e-books and 150 books in sign language.

The Swedish Braille Authority (Punktskriftsnämnden), and as of 1 August 2010, the Audio Newspaper Authority (Taltidningsnämnden), are part of MTM.

The agency is located in Bylgiahuset in Malmö and has operated there since 1 January 2020.

== History ==
A Braille library was established in Stockholm in 1892 by Amy Segerstedt, director of Tysta skolan (lit. 'the Silent School'), a private school for the deaf. It moved into the same building as the Swedish Association of the Blind (Swedish: De Blindas Förening) in 1895 and was taken over by the association in 1912.

The Swedish Association of the Blind began lending audiobooks in 1955. Library activities continued when the association changed its name to the Swedish Association of the Visually Impaired in 1977.

The Audiobook and Braille Library became an authority in 1980. When the agency was established, all books were transferred from the Swedish Association of the Visually Impaired to the agency, which thus became the lending center for audiobooks and braille books.

On 1 January 2013, the Audiobook and Braille Library changed its name to Myndigheten för tillgängliga medier ('the Agency for Accessible Media'). One of the reasons for the name change was that its assignment has been broadened from audiobooks and Braille books to include other accessible media.

== Publications ==
Since 2015, MTM has taken over the state's responsibility for publishing and distributing easy-to-read literature and making easy-to-read news information available through the publication of the easy-to-read news magazine 8 sidor.

The agency publishes three free publications, Läsliv, Vi punktskriftsläsare, and Boktidningen Lättläst.

== Nordic cooperation ==
MTM cooperates with similar agencies in the Nordic countries: the Norwegian Library of Talking Books and Braille, Nota in Denmark, Celia in Finland; and the Icelandic Hljóðbókasafns Íslands. An agreement was signed in 2009 which allows accessible literature to be shared between these countries. The agreement increases user access and also eliminates unnecessary duplication of work in creating accessible versions.

== MTM's awards ==
MTM has two awards: Årets Läsombud ('Reading Ambassador of the Year') and Läsguldet ('Reading Gold'). The Årets Läsombud award is presented to a reading ambassador or narrator (for recordings) who has made outstanding efforts to promote reading in the care sector. Läsguldet recognizes organizations or institutions that do an excellent job of enabling people with reading difficulties or disabilities to read on their own terms. Previously, the Amy Award (Amy-priset) and the Best Easy-Reading Library Award (Bästa lättlästa bibliotek) were awarded, now combined and known as Läsguldet.

=== Current awards ===
==== Läsguldet ====
Läsguldet ('Reading Gold') is MTM's accessibility award, presented to an individual or organization that has made an exciting or progressive contribution to accessible media during the year. Formerly known as the Amy Award, it is named after Amy Segerstedt, who founded the Association for Braille in 1892, a direct predecessor of MTM.

===== Recipients =====
- 2018 – The Unga läser för gamla ('youth reading for the elderly') project by Helena Pennlöv Smedberg and Laven Fathi at Gottsunda Library in Uppsala
- 2019 – The Sustainable Poetry project in Trelleborg, project leader Maria Glawe
- 2020 – Eva Fridh and Martin von Knorring for a cookbook for the visually-impaired

==== Årets läsombud ====
The Årets läsombud award ('Reading Ambassador of the Year Award') is presented to a reading ambassador or narrator for efforts to promote reading in care for disabled or elderly people.

===== Recipients =====
- 2012 – Marie Schelander, Härryda
- 2013 – Barbro Granberg and Helena Oskarsson, Piteå
- 2014 – Ann Erixson, Halmstad
- 2015 – Susanne Sandberg, Skövde
- 2016 – Ingrid Jonsson, Lidköping
- 2017 – Ingeborg Albrecht, Ystad
- 2018 – Bitte Sahlström, Östhammar
- 2019 – Agneta Json Granemalm, Ljungby
- 2020 – Sebastian Åkesson

=== Previous awards ===
==== Amy Award ====
The Amy Award was MTM's accessibility award, presented to an individual or organization that made an exciting or progressive contribution to accessible media during the year. In 2018, the Amy Award and the Best Easy-Reading Library Award were merged to form Läsguldet.

===== Recipients =====
- 2010 – Minabibliotek.se, six libraries in the Umeå region
- 2011 – Komvux Kärnan in Helsingborg
- 2012 – Heidi Carlsson Asplund, librarian and project manager
- 2013 – Anna Fahlbeck, librarian, Linköping library
- 2014 – Anne Ljungdahl, school library developer, Västerås
- 2015 – Jenny Edvardsson, teacher at Wendesgymnasiet, Kristianstad
- 2016 – Göteborg University Library's reading service
- 2017 – no award

==== Best Easy-Reading Library ====
The prize was awarded to a library that recognized the need for easy reading among several target groups and actively worked with marketing and well-planned information about easy reading.

===== Recipients =====
- 2009 – Norrköping Library
- 2010 – Sundbyberg Library
- 2011 – Strängnäs Library
- 2012 – Mjölby Library
- 2013 – Värnamo Library and Gävle Library
- 2014 – Halmstads Library
- 2015 – Linköpings Library
- 2016 – Tumba Library
- 2017 – no award

== See also ==
- Scandinavian Braille
