= Jim Fruchterman =

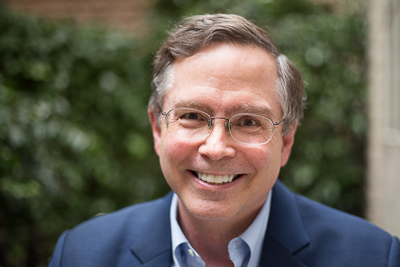
- Born: 1959
- Education: California Institute of Technology (BS, MS)
- Known for: pioneering social entrepreneur, CEO of Benetech
- Awards: MacArthur Fellowship (2006)
- Website: fruchterman.org

Jim Fruchterman is an engineer and social entrepreneur. He was the founder and longtime CEO of Benetech, a Silicon Valley nonprofit technology company that develops software applications to address unmet needs of users in the social sector. In 2018, Fruchterman started a new nonprofit called Tech Matters to develop technology solutions that can benefit social sector organizations. He is the recipient of numerous awards, including the MacArthur Fellowship and the Skoll Award for Social Entrepreneurship. Fruchterman is the author of Technology for Good, published by MIT Press, which will be published in September, 2025.

== Early life ==
Fruchterman grew up in the Chicago metropolitan area and graduated from Saint Viator High School in Arlington Heights, Illinois, in 1976.

Fruchterman received his B.S. in Engineering and M.S. in Applied Physics from Caltech in 1980 and went on to Stanford University to pursue a PhD, but left school to join the Percheron private enterprise rocket project as its electrical engineer. The rocket blew up on the launch pad, but it launched Fruchterman's career as a serial entrepreneur.

Fruchterman went on to co-found Calera Recognition Systems, one of the earliest optical character reading companies that used machine learning to recognize most fonts, before founding Benetech based on the Calera OCR technology.

== Benetech ==
Jim Fruchterman, a technology entrepreneur, established Benetech in Palo Alto, California, in 1989 under the name of Arkenstone with the goal of developing reading machines for individuals who are blind. Between 1989 and 2000, Arkenstone distributed more than 35,000 reading machines across sixty countries, supporting twelve languages. In 2000, the reading machine business was sold to Freedom Scientific, and the organization subsequently adopted the name Benetech.

Fruchterman led Benetech for 30 years. Under his leadership, Benetech established software social enterprises in the areas of education, human rights, and the environment. Its largest enterprise is Bookshare, an online library of accessible ebooks for people with print disabilities, such as visual impairment, and severe dyslexia.

In the fall of 2018, Fruchterman stepped down to start a new nonprofit project called Tech Matters with a stated goal of taking what Benetech had learned about leveraging technology to help other nonprofits become more effective.

== Tech Matters ==
Tech Matters is a nonprofit organization based in Palo Alto, California, founded by Fruchterman in 2018. Tech Matters assists non-technical social change leaders with technology (including its limitations), while also developing and implementing technology for the social sector. Tech Matters projects include:

- Aselo, an open-source contact center platform designed for helplines to handle text conversations as well as voice calls.
- Terraso, an open-source software platform designed for local leaders, farmers, and ranchers pursuing sustainable land management efforts.
- The "Better Deal for Data," a data governance initiative aimed at establishing ethical guidelines for data collection, storage, and use, focusing on benefiting individuals and communities rather than private companies.

== Honors and awards ==
Fruchterman received a MacArthur Fellowship in 2006 as well as the Skoll Award for Social Entrepreneurship. In 2003, Fruchterman was awarded the Outstanding Social Entrepreneur award from the Schwab Foundation for Social Entrepreneurship. He received the Robert F. Bray Award in 2002 from the American Council of the Blind in recognition of his efforts to make published works accessible to people who are blind or visually impaired. In 2003, Fruchterman received the Francis Joseph Campbell award from the American Library Association for outstanding contribution to the advancement of library service for people who are blind or physically disabled. He also received the Access Award from the American Foundation for the Blind.

In 2013, Fruchterman was awarded a Distinguished Alumni Award by Caltech and a Migel Medal from the American Foundation for the Blind.

In 2016, Fruchterman was awarded an honorary doctorate, Doctor of Humane Letters (L.H.D.), by Northern Illinois University.
