= News (National Library Service for the Blind and Physically Handicapped) =

Publication in the United States

- Type: Quarterly
- Format: Newsletter
- Publisher: Library of Congress: National Library Service for the Blind and Physically Handicapped
- Language: English
- City: Washington, D.C.
- Country: USA
- ISSN: 1046-1663
- OCLC number: 4518845
- Website: www.loc.gov/nls/newsletters/news/

News (ISSN 1046-1663) is a quarterly publication of the National Library Service for the Blind and Physically Handicapped (NLS), part of the U.S. Library of Congress, and is associated with libraries serving blind and physically disabled readers, and their cooperating agencies. This serial publication includes articles of interest to librarians and others, and covers a broad range of topics including libraries and technology. The primary focus of the articles is on accessibility to blind and physically disabled readers.

As early as 1958, issues of the Division for the Blind Newsletter were published by what was then called the Library of Congress Division for the Blind and Physically Handicapped. Around 1967, the name became DBPH News. The DBPH News became a regular bimonthly publication at the end of the 1960s and gained formal volume numbers with the January/February 1970 issue, ISSN 0160-9211, LCCN 78-641469, OCLC 2251914. Publication subtitled "National Library Service for the Blind and Physically Handicapped" started with the May/June 1978 issue, volume 9, number 3, as LCCN 78-648230, OCLC 4518845 for the paper edition. It became quarterly starting with the January–March 1982 issue.

Issues from 1995 (volume 26) on are available online (OCLC 4587864) at the official website or as https://webharvest.gov/peth04/20041025040841/http://loc.gov/nls/newsletters/news/index.html
