= J. Robert Atkinson =

American blind advocate (1887–1964)

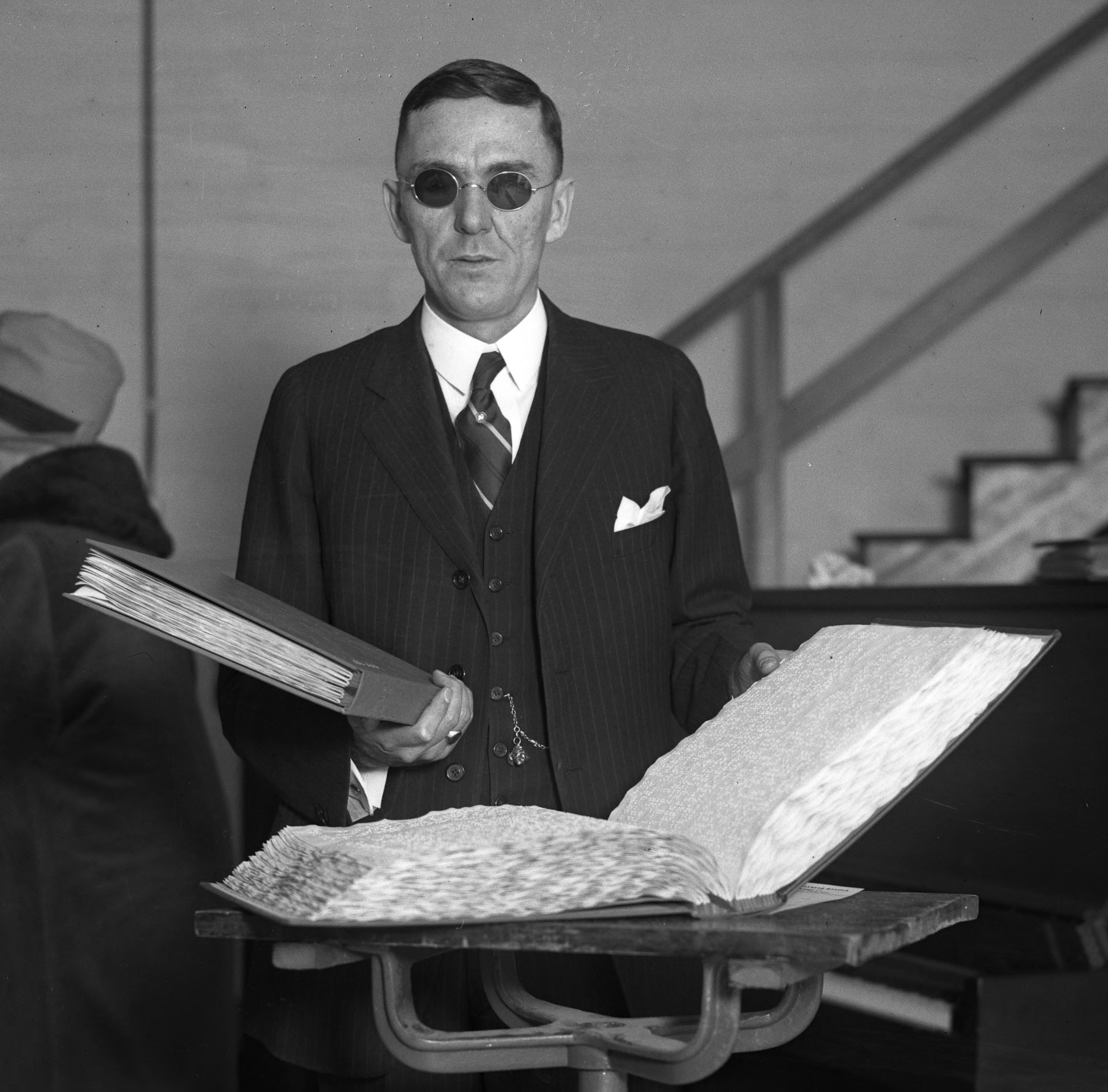
- Atkinson holding two Braille books in Los Angeles, California, 1929
- Born: November 29, 1887; Galt, Missouri, U.S.
- Died: February 1, 1964 (aged 76); Los Angeles, California, U.S.
- Known for: Founding the Universal Braille Press, publishing the first Braille edition of the King James Version of the Bible

J. Robert Atkinson (November 29, 1887 – February 1, 1964) was the founder of the Universal Braille Press in 1919 in Los Angeles, later known as the Braille Institute of America, and published the first Braille edition of the King James Version of the Bible, among other books. Atkinson became an innovator and advocate for the blind, working to enable the sight-impaired to lead normal lives.

== Life ==
Born sighted in Galt, Missouri, he dropped out of school and at age 16, went to Montana, where he worked as a cowboy until a gun accident wounded him in the face and eyes. Taken unconscious to the hospital, he remained in critical condition for nearly two weeks. His doctors removed his eyes, which they felt were injured beyond recovery, to prevent infection and save his life.

On regaining consciousness and discovering he was blind, Atkinson was beside himself. He said, "I cursed the treacherous weapon for having failed to complete its job. I cursed the doctors for having brought me back to life. I wanted the death, which it seemed to me had been denied me only to force me into a life of never-ending hopelessness and misery..." Two weeks out of the hospital, he attempted suicide, though his mother and brothers had moved to Los Angeles to help him.

He was invited by a family friend to attend church with her. Sitting in the Christian Science church service, he heard the soloist sing words written by Mary Baker Eddy and said he was so inspired, he was permanently lifted out of depression. (Note: The solo was Mary Baker Eddy's "Communion Hymn" and the verse that inspired Atkinson was "Mourner, it calls you, — "Come to my bosom, / Love wipes your tears all away, / And will lift the shade of gloom, / And for you make radiant room / Midst the glories of one endless day.") Decades later, he described the moment. "...in that one instant, all the inner darkness which had so completely engulfed me was gone, and in its place was a radiant and inexpressible glory of hope and promise so that no night remained and, with the night, vanished all my forebodings of a dark, hopeless, helpless future..." Atkinson joined The Mother Church in 1915.

He began to learn forms of reading for the blind, including Braille, and later taught other blind people to read. No longer able to live as before, Atkinson decided to resume his education, only to find that there was little published in Braille. With family members dictating to him, he used a Braille typewriter to transcribe educational and other material, filling 16 volumes in Braille. He received permission from the Christian Science Publishing Society to transcribe books by Mary Baker Eddy into Braille for his own personal use.

In 1919, he met Mary Beecher Longyear, a wealthy philanthropist involved in efforts to help the blind. She provided funds to establish a Braille printing press and for Atkinson to produce the King James Version of the Bible. He founded the Universal Braille Press in 1919; the Braille King James Bible was finished in 1924. As his printing business became established, the Christian Science Publishing Society became a major customer.

In 1926, he started a magazine called the Braille Mirror, a sort of Braille Reader's Digest of current articles from other publications. Atkinson spent the next 40 years working to improve the lives of the blind through innovation, advocacy and practical support. He invented a method of two-sided Braille printing, he recorded books for the blind, made speeches, lobbied legislators and helped blind people find jobs. He also resumed riding a horse, sometimes taking along other blind people with him.

Fifty-one years after the gunshot accident, he and a friend, screenwriter Edwin J. Westrate, wrote a book about his life, Beacon in the Night. Atkinson died in Los Angeles in 1964.

Cover of book about J. Robert Atkinson

== Legacy ==
In 1967, the town of Cascade, Montana named a park for Atkinson, also unveiling a statue of him. He was inducted into the Hall of Fame: Leaders and Legends of the Blindness Field in 2002. In 2017, he was honored with the Cascade Medal of Fortitude, a local tradition in his hometown of Cascade, Montana. His great-great-granddaughter Esmeralda accepted the award on his behalf.

The typeface Atkinson Hyperlegible, created by the Braille Institute in collaboration with Applied Design Works, is named after Atkinson.
