= Pratt–Smoot Act =

U.S. legislation to provide books to blind adults

The Pratt–Smoot Act was passed by the United States Congress, and signed into law by President Herbert Hoover on March 3, 1931. It was introduced by Ruth Baker Pratt and Reed Smoot. J. Robert Atkinson, founder of the Braille Institute of America, was instrumental in getting the act passed through his lobbying efforts.

The act provided $100,000, to be administered by the Library of Congress, to provide blind adults with books. The program, which is known as Books for the Blind, has been heavily amended and expanded over the years, and remains in place today in the form of the National Library Service for the Blind and Print Disabled.

== See also ==
- Americans with Disabilities Act of 1990
- Disability in the United States
- Education for All Handicapped Children Act
- European Accessibility Act
- Individuals with Disabilities Education Act
- Javits–Wagner–O'Day Act
