= Mary Beecher Longyear =

American philanthropist (1851–1931)

- Born: Mary Hawley Beecher; December 21, 1851; Milwaukee, Wisconsin, U.S.
- Died: March 14, 1931 (aged 79); Brookline, Massachusetts
- Occupations: Philanthropist, collector
- Known for: Founder of Longyear Museum

Mary Beecher Longyear (December 21, 1851 – March 14, 1931) was an American philanthropist and wife of John Munro Longyear, a wealthy businessman. She funded the first King James Version of the Bible in Braille and was a patron of the arts, education and benevolent organizations. A student of Christian Science, in 1911, she began collecting documents and items related to the early development of the religion and later established the Longyear Museum to further this work.

== Early life and education ==
Mary Hawley Beecher was born in Milwaukee, Wisconsin, with her twin sister Abby. Her parents were Samuel Peck Beecher, who had come to Milwaukee to start a nursery business, and Caroline Matilda Beecher (née Walker). The family moved to Erie, Pennsylvania before moving again to Augusta, Michigan, where her father started a farm close to Battle Creek, Michigan. She was educated at Battle Creek public schools and Albion College, after which she became a teacher. Her family were Congregationalists, and mother instilled in her and her siblings a love for the Bible and daily prayer and study. She taught school in Marengo, Michigan, and received further education from the state Normal school at Ypsilanti.

== Career ==
Beecher then went to teach in Marquette, Michigan, and became a member of the Congregational church there, where she met John Munro Longyear, who she married on January 4, 1879. They had seven children, one of whom would later drown in a canoe accident. As her husband's business ventures, particularly in timber and mining, became successful, they became one of the wealthiest couples in Michigan. They built a mansion in Marquette, overlooking Lake Superior, but they also became benefactors of the arts, education, and of efforts to help the blind. From the early 1890s, she was also active in the Christian Science movement, providing financial support to send Frances Thurber Seal to assist the growing interest in Christian Science in Germany.

When Southeastern Railway wanted to lay track through their property, the Longyears decided to move. Knowing that the mansion would be difficult to sell or reproduce, they had the house dismantled and shipped by train 1,300 miles to Brookline, Massachusetts, where it was rebuilt and enlarged. The feat was mentioned in Ripley's Believe It or Not.

Longyear proposed the establishment of the Benevolent Association home at Chestnut Hill, a Christian Science nursing facility, and donated land for its establishment in Brookline, Massachusetts.

In 1911, she began collecting objects, letters, and real estate relating to the early history of Christian Science and the life of Mary Baker Eddy, under the belief that these things would be valuable to future generations. In 1923, she established the Longyear Foundation, which later became the Longyear Museum in Brookline, Massachusetts. The Longyear mansion was the first home of the museum. In addition to the museum, the foundation owns and preserves a number of historic houses. Longyear also wrote a book about Asa G. Eddy and supported the writings of authors like Samuel Putnam Bancroft and William Lyman Johnson.

In 1920 she established a research organization called the Zion Research Foundation, now known as the Endowment for Biblical Research, to collect books and manuscripts related to the Bible, translate and publish literature, and finance individuals and institutions engaged in archaeology and research. She worked with E. A. Wallis Budge to curate a collection of around 13,500 volumes, and the foundation was introduced at the Society of Biblical Literature's annual meeting at Yale Divinity School in 1922, opening to the public shortly thereafter. After the discovery of the Dead Sea Scrolls, the organization funded multiple archeological digs to the site and later hosted the first public exhibition of the Dead Sea Scrolls in America in the 1950s.

In 1919, Mary Beecher Longyear offered J. Robert Atkinson $5,000 a year to create a Braille copy of the King James Version of the Bible. The project took five years. The project was the beginnings of the Braille Institute of America, headed by Atkinson.

In 1925, Longyear hosted the Women's International League for Peace and Freedom, as well as the Special Libraries Association of Boston, and again addressed the annual meeting of the Society of Biblical Literature.

Longyear was a member of a number of organizations, including the Society of Biblical Literature, Women's International League for Peace and Freedom, Daughters of the American Revolution, the Boston Authors Club, Sulgrave Manor Institute in England, and the Marquette County Historical Society, which received a bequest from Longyear's will, enabling them to purchase a building in 1937.

In 2001, a new museum building was opened in Chestnut Hill. Longyear Museum also owns eight of Eddy's homes, acquiring the final two in 2006, one in Lynn and the other at 400 Beacon Street in Chestnut Hill. According to the museum, they are maintained as "distributing centres of knowledge regarding her life 'illustrating the ethics of Truth,' not as shrines where her personality would be worshipped." Mary Longyear believed that if accurate information was preserved about Eddy, there would be less opportunity for future generations to "vilify or sanctify her" according to her son Robert D. Longyear. Webster Lithgow writes that historic preservation was not an established field when Mary Longyear started, and she can therefore be seen as "one of the pioneers of the preservation movement."

== Selected works ==
- Far Countries as Seen by a Boy (1916)
- Gathered Verses of Many Years (1921)
- The Genealogy and Life of Asa Gilbert Eddy (1922)
- Hear, O Israel! (1922)
- The History of a House (1925)
