= Braille Institute of America =

Nonprofit organization

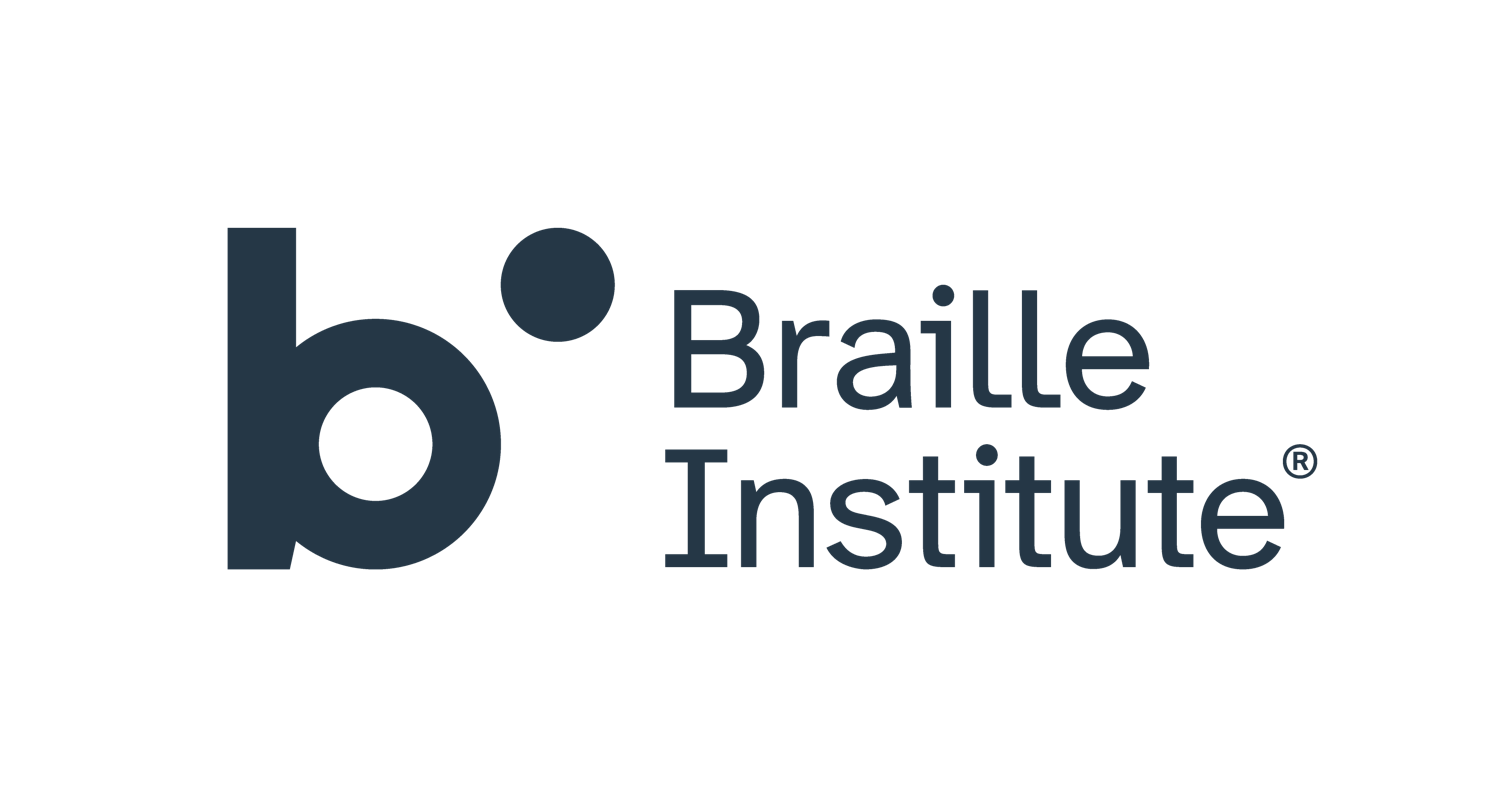
- Formation: 1919; 107 years ago
- Founded: 1919
- Founder: J. Robert Atkinson
- Type: 501(c)(3)
- Headquarters: Los Angeles, California
- Location: United States
- Region served: Seven locations covering Southern California from Santa Barbara to San Diego
- Key people: Michael Corley, Chair; Peter Mindnich, President
- Website: brailleinstitute.org

The Braille Institute of America (BIA) is a nonprofit organization with headquarters in Los Angeles providing programs, seminars and one-on-one instruction for the visually impaired community in Southern California. Funded almost entirely by private donations, all of the institute's services are provided completely free of charge. The organization has seven regional centers: Anaheim, Coachella Valley, Laguna Hills, Los Angeles, Riverside, San Diego and Santa Barbara, as well as outreach programs at more than 200 locations throughout Southern California. It is a member of the Braille Authority of North America.

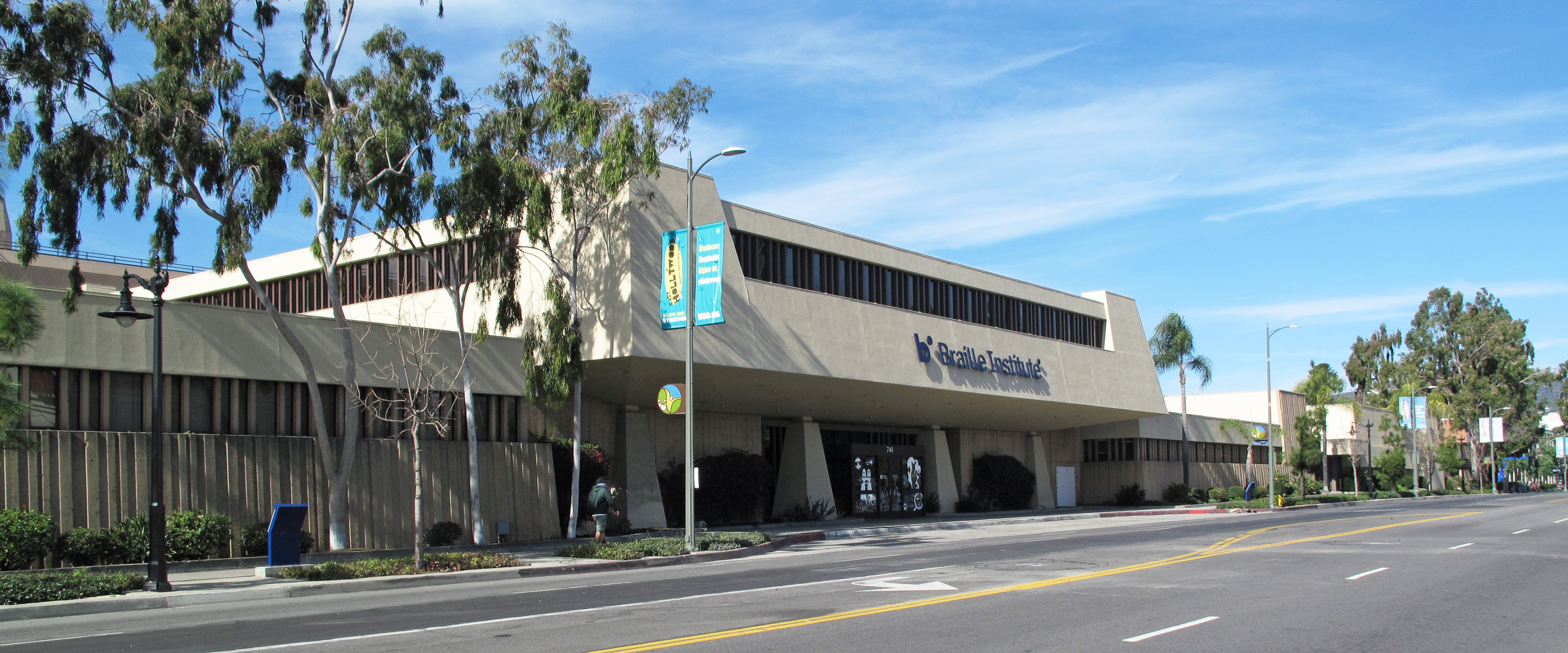
Braille Institute, Vermont Avenue, Los Angeles

BIA serves children, youth and adults, with the goal of helping its clients adapt to life with low vision and achieving fulfilling, independent lives. The organization offers instruction in adaptive cooking, home skills, mobility training and staying connected through technology. BIA's publishing arm produces "The Braille Special Collection," several series of free children's books in Braille, designed to foster an early love of reading and promote Braille Literacy.

== History ==
After losing his sight in 1912, J. Robert Atkinson, a cowboy from Montana, learned to read braille and transcribed 250 books dictated to him by his family. Impressed by his efforts, philanthropists Mary and John Longyear donated $25,000 to help Atkinson found the Universal Braille Press in 1919 in Los Angeles. By 1924, Atkinson finished printing the 21 volumes of the braille King James Version of the Bible. The Braille Mirror, a braille magazine, was first published in 1926 by the Universal Braille Press.

Atkinson lobbied lawmakers and influenced the passage of the Pratt–Smoot Act in 1931. The legislation provided $100,000 for the printing and distribution of raised-print media through the Library of Congress Services for the Blind. The Universal Braille Press incorporated as the Braille Institute of America.

In 1934, BIA joined the National Library System. BIA printed the first braille Webster's Dictionary in 1938. In 1971, Braille Institute opened its first regional center in Anaheim, California. In 2000, the first Braille Challenge was held, an annual competition for visually impaired youth that celebrates braille literacy.

== Activities ==
=== Library services ===
Braille Institute's Library Services is the Southern California branch of the National Library Service of the Library of Congress. The Library freely provides over 1.2 million Braille texts, periodicals, and audio recordings for the public. In 2009, Library Services received the National Medal for Museum and Library Service from the Institute of Museum and Library Services.

=== The Braille Challenge ===
The Braille Challenge is the Braille Institute's annual braille literacy competition for youth.

=== Atkinson Hyperlegible ===
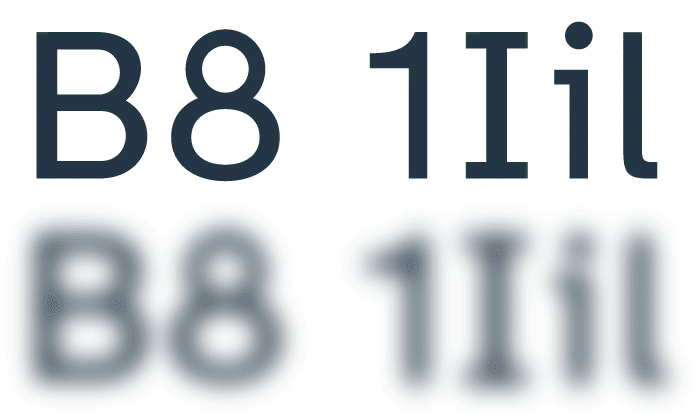
Above: How Atkinson Hyperlegible appears normally. Below: A blur effect simulates how the same letters might appear to someone with a low-vision condition.

Most of the Braille Institute's clients are not fully blind and do not use braille to read. In 2019, in collaboration with Applied Design Works, the Braille Institute released Atkinson Hyperlegible, a free typeface built around a grotesque sans-serif core. Named after J. Robert Atkinson, the typeface is meant to be optimally legible for people with low vision, who may have difficulty distinguishing similar characters.

== See also ==
- Will H. Kindig, helped establish the institute
