= Frances Thurber Seal =

Christian Science practitioner and teacher

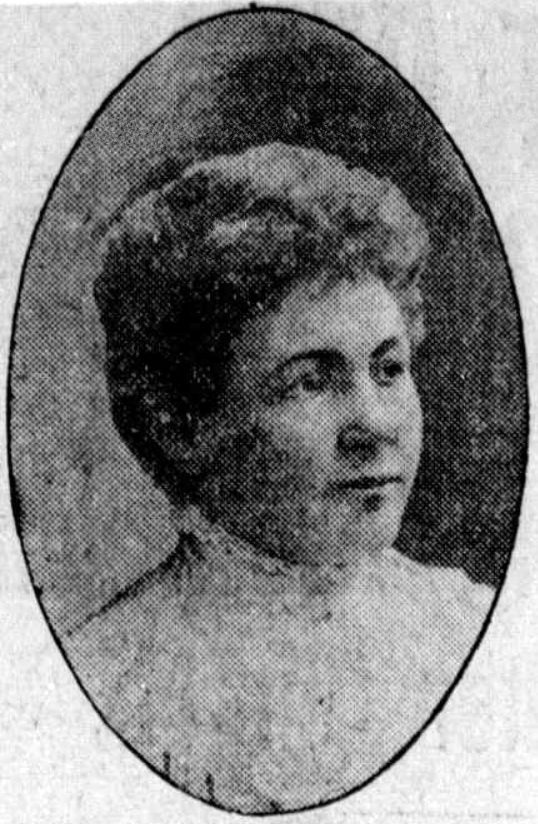
- Frances Thurber Seal
- Born: May 10, 1860; Piqua, Ohio
- Died: December 30, 1932 (aged 72); Chestnut Hill, Massachusetts
- Notable work: Christian Science in Germany

Frances Thurber Seal (1860–1932) was a Christian Science practitioner and teacher from the United States and one of three people to establish the religion in Germany. She also helped introduce it in Norway.

== Life and work ==
Born the daughter of a missionary and a preacher, her father's family was descended from French Huguenots who emigrated to England and later, to the United States. Her maternal side was Scotch Quaker. She was raised in a very religious home, but experienced deep sadness and longing after her mother's years of illness and then death, followed by the deaths of several other family members. As a young woman in New York City, she attended a Wednesday testimony meeting at the local Christian Science church, afterwards learning more of Christian Science through inquiry with Laura Lathrop, a Christian Science teacher in New York who was a student of Mary Baker Eddy. Lathrop lent her No and Yes, a 46-page book by Eddy, which Seal read that evening, three times. Afterward, she found herself no longer suffering from a long-standing stomach ailment or the failing vision she had been told would result in early blindness. She soon obtained a copy of Eddy's major work, Science and Health with Key to the Scriptures and had class instruction with Lathrop. She soon joined a church and became an active member. A year later, she was asked by Lathrop to go to Dresden, Germany, where some German Christian Scientists had been requesting someone be sent to them. Although she had no money or knowledge of the German language and though she considered herself a novice in the religion, Lathrop assured her she had the necessary qualities and she agreed to go. With financial help from Mary Beecher Longyear, Seal sailed for Germany in December 1897.

Seal was one of three people, the other two being native Germans, Bertha Günther-Peterson in Hanover and Hans Eckert in Stuttgart, working as Christian Scientists in Germany in 1897. In 1898, Seal was asked to visit Norway to talk to a woman who had cancer and to some others in Haugesund, a small fishing village.

She returned to Dresden to continue her work as a Christian Science practitioner, but soon had an opportunity to return to New York for a while, enabling her to apply for the first normal class to train new teachers under the newly established Christian Science Board of Education. After she was accepted, a by-law was published, stipulating that normal class students were to have a minimum of three years' experience in the public practice of Christian Science. Seal had only found out about the religion two years prior. The teacher of the class, Edward A. Kimball, a student of Eddy's, wrote to Eddy about the situation and was told to make an exception for Seal. Of the 180 in the class, 21 students, including Seal, were given certificates to teach.

Seal returned to Dresden, remaining through summer 1899, then moving to Berlin. Her work as a practitioner and teacher in both cities led to the establishment of Christian Science churches there. She was often so busy with patients that she had to have students come help her.

She again returned to the United States in 1902, visiting Boston and Concord, New Hampshire, hoping to visit Eddy. Told that she was not receiving visitors, Seal was later surprised when Eddy paid an unexpected visit to her at her hotel. Seal moved back to the United States in 1906, settling in New York, where she continued her work as a Christian Scientist. In 1922, she was quoted as saying, "About twenty-six years ago I first came in contact with Christian Science through attending a testimony meeting, where I heard it said that the Science of Being had been discovered; that it revealed the reality and permanence of good, and demonstrated that evil, expressed through sin, disease, and death, was not a function of Being but abnormal and unnecessary, and could be overcome. After thinking of this for a time I visited a Christian Science reading room to ask how to begin to gain freedom from fear. There I found a young man who told me that I lived in divine Mind, not in matter; hence I need have no fear of material conditions. This did not convey much to me at that time, but I went away assured that it meant something real and worthwhile to him. His statement that this thought of itself would be helpful was soon proved to be true, with such startling distinctness that I resolved to study Christian Science earnestly and test it for myself. This I have continued to do during the years that have followed, and I have seen it remove mountains of sorrow, of sickness, and of sin. I have seen the blind restored to sight, the deaf regain their hearing, the deformed and crippled made whole, and the drunkard, libertine, and criminal restored to normal health and become helpful citizens." In 1931, Seal published a book about her experiences in Germany.

== Publications ==
- "Health Revealed" in the Christian Science Sentinel (January 20, 1917)
- Christian Science in Germany (1931)
  - Wundertaten der Wahrheit im Anfang der Christian Science in Deutschland (1931) - German translation of Christian Science in Germany
