= German Central Library for the Blind =

Coordinates: 51°20′41″N 12°21′59″E

The German Central Library for the Blind (DZB) Deutsches Zentrum für barrierefreies Lesen, earlier Deutsche Zentralbücherei für Blinde
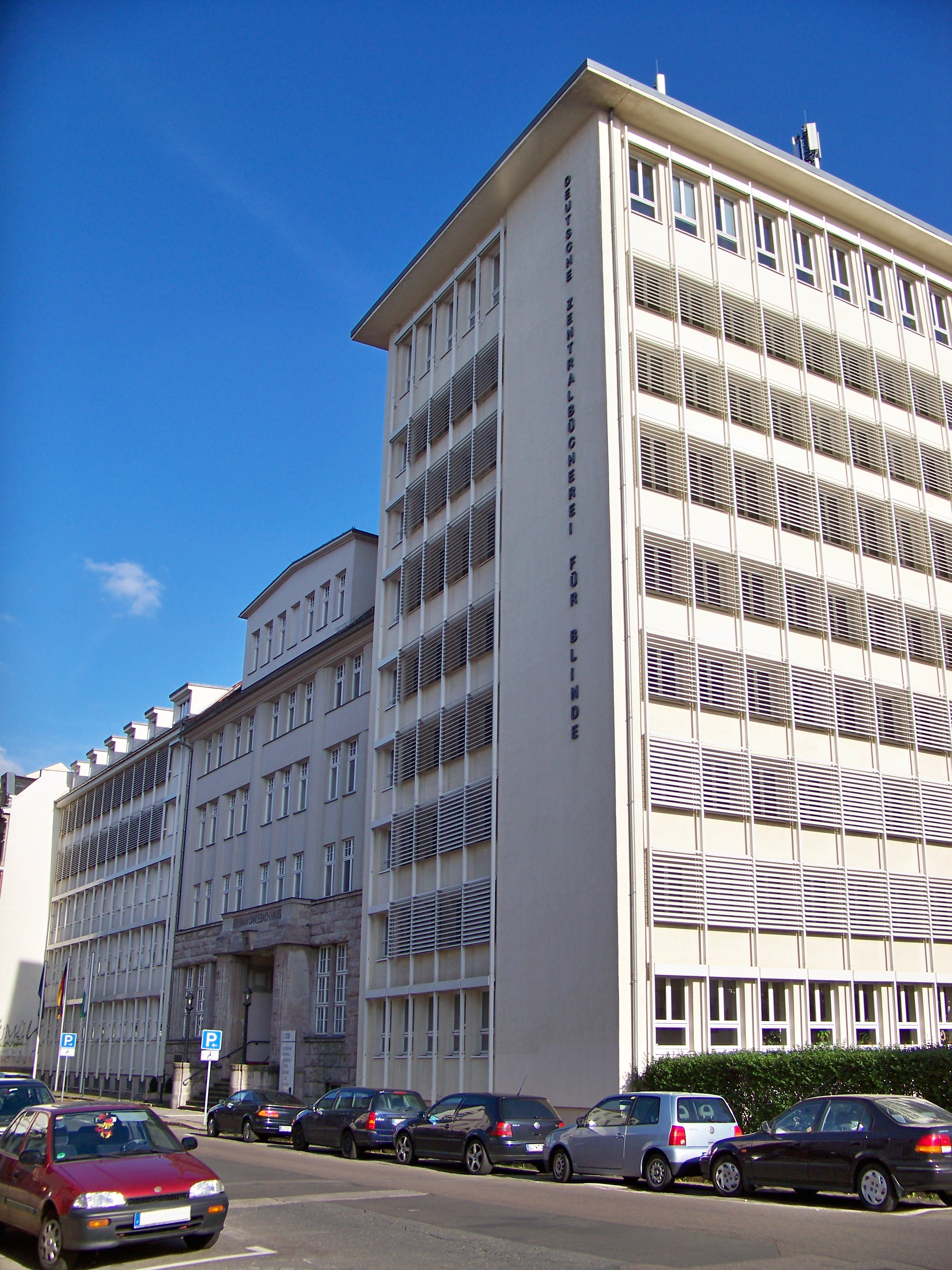
- Location: Gustav-Adolf-Straße 7; 04105 Leipzig, Germany
- Established: 1894

Collection
- Size: 72,300

Access and use
- Circulation: 192,600

Other information
- Director: Dr. Thomas Kahlisch
- Employees: 77
- Website: http://www.dzb.de/

The German Central Library for the Blind (German: Deutsches Zentrum für barrierefreies Lesen, earlier Deutsche Zentralbücherei für Blinde), abbreviated DZB, is a public library for the visually impaired located in the city of Leipzig, Saxony, Germany, in the Zentrum-Nordwest locality. Its collection of 72,300 titles is amongst the largest in the German speaking countries. The institution consists of a lending library, a publishing house, and a research center for barrier-free communication. It also has production facilities for braille books, audiobooks, and braille music. The DZB publishes about 250 new titles annually. Founded in 1894, the DZB is the oldest library for the blind in Germany.

== History ==
A private association, the Society for the Procurement of Large-print Books and Work Opportunities for the Blind (German: Verein zur Beschaffung von Hochdruckschriften und Arbeitsgelegenheit für Blinde zu Leipzig), was established in Leipzig in 1894 to provide blind persons with literature and employment. It was set up in a bookseller's house and grew into the first library for blind persons in the German Empire. Soon afterward the society established its own publishing house and printing press. A charitable foundation, the Verein zur Förderung der Deutschen Zentralbücherei für Blinde, was established in 1916 to support and promote the library. By this time over 5,000 braille volumes were available and it had 1,200 regular users.

Following World War I, the number of users rose sharply and by 1926 the DZB had 3,500 users. The Great Depression forced the library into a rigid austerity, resulting in budget cuts and layoffs. In 1935 the DZB moved into the commercial publishing house Druckhaus Klepzig on the Täubchenweg in Leipzig. This building was later destroyed in an Allied bombing raid in December 1943 and over 30,000 of the library's books were lost. What little remained of the collection was set up at an alternative site at Döbeln in 1944.

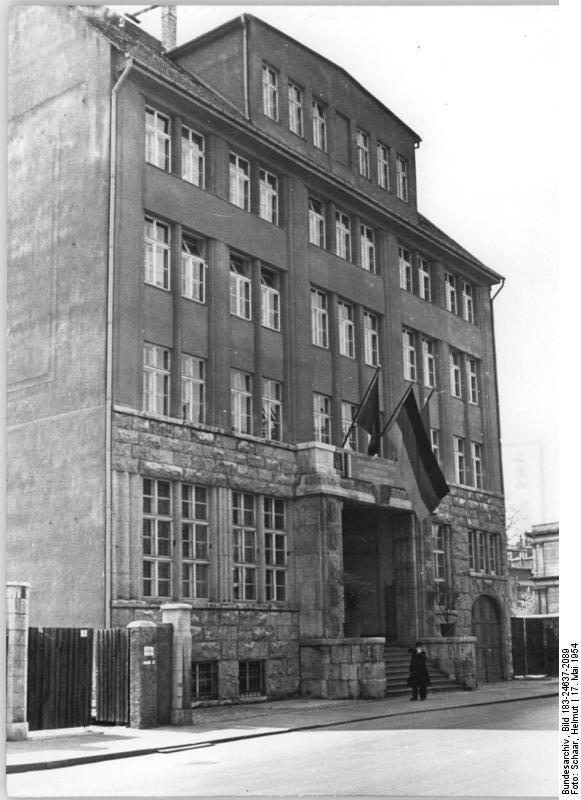
The DZB in 1954

In the immediate aftermath of World War II the DZB moved to new quarters on the Weißenfelser Straße with a collection of 1,802 books. Through a decision of the provincial government on 7 November 1946 the library was declared a public institution. By 1949 the library's collection had reached 10,000 volumes. In 1952 DZB came under the auspices of the East German Ministry of Education and in 1955 it was subject to the Ministry of Culture. In 1954 the library moved into the building still in use today in Gustav-Adolf-Straße (Gustavus Adolphus Street).

Following German reunification the DZB became an agency of the State Ministry of Science and Arts of the new Free State of Saxony.

== Collection ==
As of December 2011 the library holds some 72,300 titles. A research section holds books, periodicals and monographs on visual impairment. In addition, the DZB regularly publishes 18 different journals in Braille and in audio versions. The DZB's collection includes:

- 72,300 total items
  - 21,900 Braille books
  - 19,000 DAISY audiobooks
  - 6,100 Braille music books
  - 5,000 Scientific books and monographs on visual impairment

Each year the DZB produces about 250 new titles. It has a staff of 77 employees, 15 of whom are persons with disabilities. According to the DZB, "over 5,000 members use the library's different services."

== Braille music facilities ==
The "DaCapo" project, funded by the German Federal Ministry of Health, began at the DZB in 2003 to produce specialty sheet music for the blind. The goal is not only to make musical scores more widely available to the visually impaired, but also to improve career opportunities for blind musicians. The DZB's research center is also developing processes for the computer-assisted production of sheet music in Braille and as well as transmission services.

The MakeBraille rendering service accepts digital musical notation files over the Internet in CapXML and MusicXML formats to produce sheet music in Braille format, available for private, non-commercial uses only.

== See also ==
- DAISY
- List of libraries in Germany
- West German Audio Book Library for the Blind
