= Deutsch-Französisches Institut =

French-German cultural institute

Deutsch-Französisches Institut or dFi (as per homepage) is an institute offering cultural exchange between Germany and France in Erlangen, established on 1 November 2003.

dFi is the Centre Franco-Allemands in Bavaria. The institute offers language courses both in French and German and other cultural activities for francophones.
