= Marrakesh VIP Treaty =

2016 Copyright treaty

Marrakesh Treaty to Facilitate Access to Published Works to Visually Impaired Persons and Persons with Print Disabilities
- Map of countries where the Treaty is in force as of November 2026.
- Type: Multilateral
- Signed: 28 June 2013
- Location: Marrakesh, Morocco
- Effective: 30 September 2016
- Condition: Ratification of 20 states
- Signatories: 80
- Parties: 105 (131 countries, including EUs 27 member states)
- Depositary: World Intellectual Property Organization

The Marrakesh VIP Treaty (formally the Marrakesh Treaty to Facilitate Access to Published Works for Persons who are Blind, Visually Impaired or Otherwise Print Disabled, colloquially Marrakesh Treaty or MVT) is a treaty on copyright adopted in Marrakesh, Morocco, on 27 June 2013. It achieved the deposit of 20 instruments of ratification or accession by eligible parties needed for entry into force on June 30, 2016 and entered into force three months later, on September 30, 2016. As of April 14, 2025, the treaty has 101 contracting parties covering 127 WIPO Member States because the European Union joined as a block. As of September 2026, the treaty has 105 contracting parties.

== History ==
The treaty seeks to remedy a "book famine" for people who are unable to access standard print materials. Before the implementation of the treaty, the World Blind Union estimated that over 90% of copyrighted works were not produced in accessible formats. In developing countries, over 99% of published materials are inaccessible to those using Braille, large print, or audio formats.

Before the treaty was signed, under one third of countries provided a copyright exception to allow the sharing of works to people with disabilities without the copyright holders' permission. However, even when these copyright exemptions were present, individual countries could not share materials between themselves. As an example, the World Blind Union notes: "In Spain, for example, there are approximately 100,000 accessible books, whereas Argentina has only about 25,000. Yet Spain's accessible books cannot be exported legally to Argentina or to other Spanish-speaking countries." Additionally, where copyright exemptions did exist, they were not always uniform in nature. The United States has long had the Chafee Amendment, which among other things allows for the existence of the National Library Service for the Blind and Print Disabled. However, this copyright exemption before the treaty only applied to previously published nondramatic literary works. In contrast, Australia prior to the treaty already had copyright exemptions that applied to all literary and dramatic works. Establishing a treaty had as a goal creating one set of rules to help facilitate sharing of all manner of works across international borders.

== Treaty ==
The treaty allows for copyright exceptions to facilitate the creation of accessible versions of books and other copyrighted works for visually impaired persons. It sets a norm for countries ratifying the treaty to have a domestic copyright exception covering these activities and allowing for the import and export of such materials.

Sixty-three countries signed the treaty as of the close of the diplomatic conference in Marrakesh. The ratification of 20 states was required for the treaty to enter into effect; the 20th ratification was received on 30 June 2016, and the treaty entered into force on 30 September 2016.

=== Ratification ===
India was the first country to ratify the treaty, on 24 July 2014. As of October 15, 2018, 80 countries have signed the Treaty and 129 states have ratified it including EU's 28 member-states who ratified as one entity (notification number 45), and most recently Cuba.

The European Union ratified the treaty for all 28 members on October 1, 2018. The provisions of the Treaty went into effect across the EU (including in the United Kingdom) on January 1, 2019.

The UK left the EU on January 31, 2020. but was covered by the EU's ratification of the treaty until December 31, 2020. The UK deposited their instrument of ratification on October 1, 2020. This meant that on January 1, 2021, the UK became a contracting party in its own right.

On September 20, 2017, the EU Commission published a directive and a regulation on the Marrakesh treaty that had to be transposed into national law, in all 28 member states; the deadline for transposition was October 11, 2018. Member states were required to update their national laws to implement the Treaty's requirements later in 2018. This followed a lengthy and occasionally controversial process that began shortly after the treaty was initially passed. In March 2015, the Council of the European Union accused the European Commission of delaying the adoption of the treaty by EU and called upon the Commission "to submit without delay the necessary legislative proposal". There was continued opposition by some EU member states.

On June 28, 2018, the U.S. Senate approved it and the implementation bill S. 2559 without apparent opposition; the House approved S.2559 via unanimous consent on September 25, 2018. The bill and the Treaty were signed into law by President Trump on October 9, 2018. As a result, on February 8, 2019, the United States of America formally joined the treaty.

=== Countries which have ratified the treaty ===
By March 4, 2026, 103 Contracting Parties (129 countries) worldwide had ratified or acceded to the Marrakesh treaty. See table below:

Contracting Party	Signature	Instrument	In Force
Afghanistan	June 28, 2013	Ratification: July 26, 2018	October 26, 2018
Angola		Accession: December 15, 2025	March 15, 2026
Argentina	May 21, 2014	Ratification: April 1, 2015	September 30, 2016
Armenia		Accession: June 1, 2022	September 1, 2022
Australia	June 23, 2014	Ratification: December 10, 2015	September 30, 2016
Austria	June 25, 2014		See European Union
Azerbaijan		Accession: September 24, 2018	December 24, 2018
Bangladesh		Accession: September 26, 2022	December 26, 2022
Barbados		Accession: February 20, 2023	May 20, 2023
Belarus		Accession: July 22, 2020	October 22, 2020
Belgium	June 25, 2014		See European Union
Belize		Accession: November 9, 2018	February 9, 2019
Bolivia (Plurinational State of)		Accession: March 12, 2019	June 12, 2019
Bosnia and Herzegovina	June 28, 2013	Ratification: January 20, 2021	April 20, 2021
Botswana		Accession: October 5, 2016	January 5, 2017
Brazil	June 28, 2013	Ratification: December 11, 2015	September 30, 2016
Burkina Faso	June 28, 2013	Ratification: July 31, 2017	October 31, 2017
Burundi	June 28, 2013		
Cabo Verde		Accession: February 22, 2019	May 22, 2019
Cambodia	June 28, 2013		
Cameroon	June 28, 2013	Ratification: October 5, 2021	January 5, 2022
Canada		Accession: June 30, 2016	September 30, 2016
Central African Republic	June 28, 2013	Ratification: August 19, 2020	November 19, 2020
Chad	June 28, 2013		
Chile	June 28, 2013	Ratification: May 10, 2016	September 30, 2016
China (Note: As declared in the instrument, the treaty applies to both Mainland China and Hong Kong SAR, but not yet apply to Macau SAR.)	June 28, 2013	Ratification: February 5, 2022	May 5, 2022
Colombia	June 28, 2013	Ratification: February 27, 2025	May 27, 2025
Comoros	June 28, 2013	Ratification: January 25, 2021	April 25, 2021
Congo	June 28, 2013		
Cook Islands		Accession: March 19, 2019	June 19, 2019
Costa Rica	June 28, 2013	Ratification: October 9, 2017	January 9, 2018
Côte d'Ivoire	June 28, 2013		
Cyprus	June 28, 2013		See European Union
Cuba		Accession: March 4, 2026	June 4, 2026
Czech Republic	June 24, 2014		
Democratic People's Republic of Korea	June 28, 2013	Ratification: February 19, 2016	September 30, 2016
Denmark	June 28, 2013		See European Union
Djibouti	June 28, 2013		
Dominican Republic	June 28, 2013	Ratification: June 5, 2018	September 5, 2018
Ecuador	May 8, 2014	Ratification: June 29, 2016	September 30, 2016
El Salvador	October 11, 2013	Ratification: October 1, 2014	September 30, 2016
Ethiopia	June 28, 2013	Ratification: November 2, 2020	February 2, 2021
European Union (EU)	April 30, 2014	Ratification: October 1, 2018	January 1, 2019
Finland	June 20, 2014		See European Union
France	April 30, 2014		See European Union
Georgia		Accession: November 26, 2024	February 26, 2025
Germany	June 20, 2014		See European Union
Ghana	June 28, 2013	Ratification: May 11, 2018	August 11, 2018
Greece	April 30, 2014		See European Union
Guatemala	June 2, 2014	Ratification: June 29, 2016	September 30, 2016
Guinea	June 28, 2013		
Haiti	June 28, 2013		
Holy See	June 28, 2013		
Honduras		Accession: March 29, 2017	June 29, 2017
Iceland		Accession: December 9, 2021	March 9, 2022
India	April 30, 2014	Ratification: June 24, 2014	September 30, 2016
Indonesia	September 24, 2013	Ratification: January 28, 2020	April 28, 2020
Iran (Islamic Republic of)	June 27, 2014		
Iraq		Accession: April 23, 2024	July 23, 2024
Ireland	June 20, 2014		See European Union
Israel		Accession: March 21, 2016	September 30, 2016
Jamaica		Accession: May 28, 2024	August 28, 2024
Japan		Accession: October 1, 2018	January 1, 2019
Jordan	June 28, 2013	Ratification: June 26, 2018	September 26, 2018
Kazakhstan		Accession: April 14, 2025	July 14, 2025
Kenya	June 28, 2013	Ratification: June 2, 2017	September 2, 2017
Kiribati		Accession: July 31, 2019	October 31, 2019
Kyrgyzstan		Accession: May 15, 2017	August 15, 2017
Lebanon	June 28, 2013		
Lesotho		Accession: April 30, 2018	July 30, 2018
Liberia		Accession: October 6, 2016	January 6, 2017
Liechtenstein		Accession: September 22, 2021	December 22, 2021
Lithuania	September 27, 2013		See European Union
Luxembourg	June 28, 2013		See European Union
Malawi		Accession: July 14, 2017	October 14, 2017
Malaysia		Accession: March 31, 2022	June 30, 2022
Mali	June 28, 2013	Ratification: December 16, 2014	September 30, 2016
Marshall Islands		Accession: February 8, 2019	May 8, 2019
Mauritania	June 28, 2013		
Mauritius	June 28, 2013	Ratification: January 11, 2021	April 11, 2021
Mexico	June 25, 2014	Ratification: July 29, 2015	September 30, 2016
Mongolia	June 28, 2013	Ratification: September 23, 2015	September 30, 2016
Montenegro		Accession: March 8, 2022	June 8, 2022
Morocco	June 28, 2013	Ratification: May 15, 2019	August 15, 2019
Mozambique	August 22, 2013	Ratification: January 27, 2026	April 27, 2026
Namibia	August 12, 2013		
Nepal	June 28, 2013		
New Zealand		Accession: October 4, 2019	January 4, 2020
Nicaragua		Accession: January 16, 2020	April 16, 2020
Nigeria	June 28, 2013	Ratification: October 4, 2017	January 4, 2018
Norway	June 20, 2014	Ratification: August 31, 2021	November 30, 2021
Pakistan		Accession: March 12, 2024	June 12, 2024
Panama	June 28, 2013	Ratification: February 10, 2017	May 10, 2017
Paraguay	June 28, 2013	Ratification: January 20, 2015	September 30, 2016
Peru	June 28, 2013	Ratification: February 2, 2016	September 30, 2016
Philippines		Accession: December 18, 2018	March 18, 2019
Poland	June 24, 2014		See European Union
Qatar		Accession: October 24, 2018	January 24, 2019
Republic of Korea	June 26, 2014	Ratification: October 8, 2015	September 30, 2016
Republic of Moldova	June 28, 2013	Ratification: February 19, 2018	May 19, 2018
Russian Federation		Accession: February 8, 2018	May 8, 2018
Rwanda		Accession: October 25, 2021	January 25, 2022
Saint Kitts and Nevis		Accession: July 8, 2024	October 8, 2024
Saint Lucia		Accession: June 11, 2020	September 11, 2020
Saint Vincent and the Grenadines		Accession: September 5, 2016	December 5, 2016
San Marino		Accession: June 2, 2020	September 2, 2020
Sao Tome and Principe	June 28, 2013	Ratification: October 15, 2020	January 15, 2021
Saudi Arabia		Accession: November 21, 2018	February 21, 2019
Senegal	June 28, 2013		
Serbia		Accession: February 24, 2020	May 24, 2020
Sierra Leone	June 28, 2013		
Singapore		Accession: March 30, 2015	September 30, 2016
Slovenia	May 16, 2014		See European Union
Sri Lanka		Accession: October 5, 2016	January 5, 2017
Sudan	June 28, 2013		
Switzerland	June 28, 2013	Ratification: February 11, 2020	May 11, 2020
Syrian Arab Republic	November 22, 2013		
Tajikistan		Accession: February 27, 2019	May 27, 2019
Thailand		Accession: January 28, 2019	April 28, 2019
Togo	June 28, 2013		
Trinidad and Tobago		Accession: October 4, 2019	January 4, 2020
Tunisia	June 28, 2013	Ratification: September 7, 2016	December 7, 2016
Turkey	November 1, 2013		
Turkmenistan		Accession: October 15, 2020	January 15, 2020
Uganda	June 28, 2013	Ratification: April 23, 2018	July 23, 2018
Ukraine		Accession: June 8, 2023	September 8, 2023
United Arab Emirates		Accession: October 15, 2014	September 30, 2016
United Kingdom	June 28, 2013	Ratification: October 1, 2020	January 1, 2021
United Republic of Tanzania		Accession: April 8, 2020	July 8, 2020
United States of America	October 2, 2013	Ratification: February 8, 2019	May 8, 2019
Uruguay	June 28, 2013	Ratification: December 1, 2014	September 30, 2016
Uzbekistan		Accession: March 7, 2022	June 7, 2022
Vanuatu		Accession: May 6, 2020	August 6, 2020
Venezuela (Bolivarian Republic of)		Accession: October 2, 2019	January 2, 2020
Viet Nam		Accession: December 6, 2022	March 6, 2023
Zimbabwe	October 2, 2013	Ratification: September 12, 2019	December 12, 2019

== Initiatives ==
The Accessible Books Consortium (ABC), launched in 2014, was conceived as "one possible initiative, among others, to concretely achieve the goals of the Marrakesh Treaty". ABC aims to increase the number of books worldwide in accessible formats – such as braille, audio and large print – and to make them available to people who are blind, have low vision or are otherwise print disabled.
