= Braille literacy =

Ability to read using braille

In sighted children, reading literacy at a basic level means they should understand common words, answer simple questions about the information presented, and have enough fluency to get through the material in a timely manner. Over the course of a child's education, these foundations are built on to teach higher levels of math, science, and comprehension skills. Children who are blind not only have the education disadvantage of not being able to see: they also miss out on the very fundamental parts of early and advanced education if not provided with the necessary tools.

== Statistics ==
In 1960, 50 percent of legally blind school-age children in the United States were able to read braille. There are numerous causes for the decline in braille usage, including school budget constraints, technology advancement, and different philosophical views over how blind children should be educated.

A major turning point for braille literacy was the passage by the United States Congress of the Rehabilitation Act of 1973, which moved thousands of children from specialized schools for the blind into mainstream public schools. Because only a small percentage of public schools could afford to train and hire braille-qualified teachers, braille literacy has declined since the law took effect.

In 1998–99 there were approximately 55,200 legally blind children in the United States, but only 5,500 of them used braille as their primary reading medium. Early braille education is crucial to literacy for a visually impaired child. A study conducted in the state of Washington found that people who learned braille at an early age did just as well as, if not better than, their sighted peers in several areas, including vocabulary and comprehension. In the preliminary adult study, it was found that 44 percent of the participants who had learned to read braille were unemployed, compared to the 77 percent unemployment rate of those who had learned to read using print.

Currently, 90 percent of employed blind people are braille literate. Among adults who do not know braille, only 1 in 3 is employed. Statistically, history has proven that braille reading proficiency provides an essential skill set that allows visually impaired children not only to compete with their sighted peers in a school environment, but also later in life as they enter the workforce.

== Programs ==
=== Braille instruction at Hadley ===
Hadley Institute for the Blind and Visually Impaired is the largest educator of braille as well as the largest worldwide provider of distance education for people who are blind or visually impaired. Braille literacy has been a priority for Hadley since its founding in 1920, and to this day, braille courses are still the most popular. During the 2010 fiscal year, Hadley enrolled nearly 3,400 students in braille reading and writing courses alone (combined sighted and blind students). Hadley currently offers 14 braille courses taught by 11 highly trained instructors. Nine courses are focused on tactile learners, and Hadley also provides five courses for sighted individuals, including families and professionals in the field.

Hadley School has advanced the use of braille in a number of ways over the years, including being one of the first institutions to use the Thermoform Duplicator, which copies braille from paper to a Brailon (a sheet of durable plastic), and one of the first to use a computer-driven, high-speed braille printer. Hadley produces more than 50,000 braille pages each year, supplementing mass brailling done offsite. For a fee, Hadley provides braille transcription services in accordance with the Braille Authority of North America. Transcribers are certified by the National Library Service for the Blind and Physically Handicapped.

=== NLS Braille Certification Program ===
The National Library Service for the Blind and Physically Handicapped (NLS) of the Library of Congress has contracted with the National Federation of the Blind (NFB) to offer a certificate of proficiency for braille transcribers and proofreaders who are interested in working in their communities to produce braille materials for blind people. Certified braille volunteers transcribe material into braille that is used by state departments of special education, NLS, and libraries that distribute books and magazines through the NLS program. These volunteers complete a detailed course of braille transcribing and provide essential materials in the advancement of braille literacy.

The NLS also offers a broad range of braille literacy information and resources including braille books, software, and other material intended to assist with the production of braille. They provide educational resources for instructors who teach braille as well as those who are interested in learning to read and write braille.

=== Dots for Tots ===
The Dots for Tots program aims to engage and strengthen the senses of a visually impaired child. This is important to get them prepared for reading and interested in literacy. The free program offers free books and kits to promote literacy among blind children of preschool and early elementary age. The dots in this program are very important and parallel with the literacy requirements of a sighted child learning their ABCs. It also helps grab a blind child's interest in the same way that a picture book encourages literacy for a sighted child.

The program equips schools and educators with the tools to ensure that children who are blind receive the same quality of education that their sighted peers do. It helps remove education barriers as well as ease the fears that many children have of facing school with a handicap.

This program provides visually impaired children with books that have been printed in braille. Children are able to follow along with the rest of their classmates when reading popular children's books in libraries, at home, or in a school environment. Dots for Tots provide a kit that includes the children's book in braille, a tape with a professional descriptive narration with sound effects, and a set of three-dimensional toys that allow them to understand the importance of visualizing stories with their fingers.

=== Connecting the Dots ===
The American Foundation for the Blind offers the Connecting the Dots resource for parents to promote early braille literacy. The program provides a folder containing fact sheets about braille, resource lists, and information for parents about braille, organizations that promote braille literacy, sources of braille books and magazines, adapted materials, and other information intended to promote literacy development.

=== Instant Access to Braille ===
The Instant Access to Braille program, supported through US Department of Education Office of Special Education Programs CFDA 84.00327A, provides blind and visually impaired students with access to learning materials in braille to support braille literacy efforts in general education classrooms. This program provides portable braille note-taking devices to students to train students as well as assist educators, parents, and school administrators overcome the barriers of teaching special needs children and ensuring that students receive the equivalent education opportunities that sighted children receive. The program also provides assistance with converting their printed learning materials into electronic format so that visually impaired students are not at disadvantaged in the school environment. The Instant Access program is intended to assist students in grades 3–10 that use New York State curriculum and is focused on academics related mainly to Social Studies.

=== Braille Challenge ===
The Braille Challenge is an annual two-stage competition to motivate blind students to emphasize their study of braille. The program parallels the importance and education purpose of a spelling bee for sighted children. In the competition, students transcribe and read braille using a Perkins Brailler. Their speed and accuracy, reading comprehension, ability to decode charts and graphs, and spelling are tested.

=== Twin Vision books ===
The American Action Fund for Blind Children and Adults provides specially-made "Twin Vision" children's books with both braille and written English. The dual encoding allows both adults and children who are visually impaired to read along with a person who is not visually impaired.

Twin Vision books are also provided by Braille House to the whole of Australia.
