= DAISY Forum of India =

Blindness organization based in India

DAISY Forum of India is a not for profit organisation involved in the production of books and other reading materials for persons with print disabilities including blindness. It is a network of more than 80 organisations working in different parts of India for the welfare of visually impaired people. The members of the Forum are categorised into different classes: Primary Members, Associate Members, Development Partners, Friends of the Society, Supporters of the Society and Partners in Governance. All categories of members, except Partners in Governance, have to pay a fixed amount to be eligible to become members. There are different committees like Technology Committee, Awareness Committee, Capacity Building Committee, and Policy and Regulations Intervention Committee to deal with various different activities of the organisation.

DAISY Forum of India is an Associate Member of DAISY Consortium, which is a global consortium working for the development and promotion of the DAISY standard.
