= Bookshare =

Online ebook library

- Location: United States

Collection
- Size: 903,068 titles (July 2020)

Other information
- Director: Fred Slone (Director of Operations)
- Website: www.bookshare.org

Bookshare is an online library of accessible ebooks for people with print disabilities, such as visual impairment, severe dyslexia, and cerebral palsy. An initiative of Benetech, a social enterprise organization based in Palo Alto, California, it was founded in 2001 by Jim Fruchterman. Bookshare provides books in DAISY, EPUB, BRF (Braille refreshable format), MP3, and Microsoft Word document formats. Books have been contributed by volunteers, authors, libraries, universities, and publishers. By 2010 more than half of books had been contributed by publishers and by 2020 more than 900 publishers had partnered with Bookshare, contributing to its library of more than 900,000 books.

Since 2007, Bookshare has received awards from the U.S. Department of Education, Office of Special Education Programs (OSEP), to provide free access for all U.S. students with a qualifying print disability, with the five-year allocation from 2017 to 2022 totaling $42.5 million. Similar programs have been set up in the United Kingdom and Ireland. Bookshare also partners with libraries and blindness organizations around the world.
