= The Central Library for Blind and Reading Impaired People (Israel) =

Coordinates: 32°19′59.62″N 34°51′20.65″E

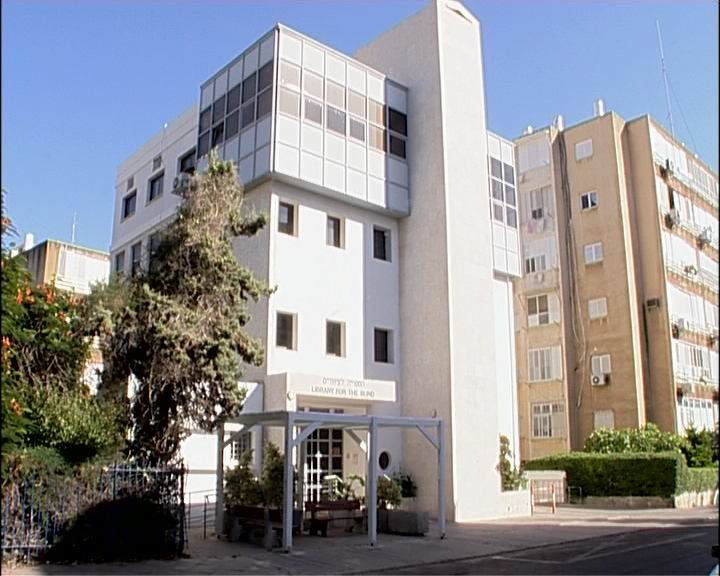
Main branch of the library in Netanya (2007)

The Central Library for Blind and Reading Impaired People (Israel) (Hebrew: הספרייה המרכזית לעיוורים ולבעלי לקויות קריאה), formerly known as The Central Library for the Blind, Visually Impaired and Handicapped, supplies people who cannot read books, for various disabilities, with books which are suitable for them, either in Braille, large print, or in recorded formats.

== History ==
The library was established in 1951 as a response to the need to rehabilitate soldiers who sustained injuries which blinded them during the 1947–1949 Palestine war.

The Israeli Ministry of Defense with Dr. Ludwig Cohen and Chaja Böhm pioneered the idea, and with the help of volunteers, Mrs. Elfriede Schönfeld and Mrs. Grünthal, translated books to Braille. Haya Berm, the first director of the library who would remain with it until 1977, joined during this period.

In 1959 the library started also producing audio cassettes through a studio in Tel-Aviv, beginning the project of transferring recorded books to cassettes in 1972. The most notable recording made in this period was a recording of The Tanach by Shlomo Bertonov.

In 2004 the effort to convert the audio cassettes, which were produced until that point, to CD format began, alongside producing new books in CD audio format.

The library nowadays (2012) produces CDs, Braille books, and large print books.
