= Deep Foundations Institute =

The Deep Foundations Institute
- Formation: 1976
- Type: Construction Association
- Tax ID no.: 22-2145952
- Headquarters: Hawthorne, New Jersey
- Members: 3000+
- President: Michael H. Wysockey
- Key people: Theresa Engler, Executive Director
- Revenue: $3,513,748 (2018)
- Staff: 14
- Website: www.dfi.org

Deep Foundations Institute (DFI) is an international association of contractors, engineers, manufacturers, suppliers, academics and owners in the deep foundations industry.

DFI was incorporated as a 501(c)6 association in January 1976. It was founded by Jack Dougherty and Hal Hunt during the “Pile Talk” seminars and became a multidisciplinary worldwide membership organization.

== Technical committees ==
- Augered Cast-in-Place and Drilled Displacement Pile
- Anchored Earth Retention
- BIM and Digitalisation (Europe)
- Continuous Flight Auger Pile (India)
- Codes and Standards
- Deep Foundations for Landslides and Slope Stabilization
- Drilled Shaft
- Driven Pile
- Electric Power Foundation Systems
- Geotechnical Characterization for Foundations (India)
- Ground Improvement
- Helical Piles and Tiebacks
- Information Management Systems
- International Grouting
- Manufacturers, Suppliers and Service Providers
- Micropile
- Risk and Contracts
- Seismic and Lateral Loads
- Structural Slurry Wall and Seepage Control
- Soil Mixing
- Subsurface Characterization for Deep Foundations
- Sustainability
- Testing and Evaluation
- Tunneling and Underground
- Women in Deep Foundations

== International chapters ==
DFI currently supports chapters in Europe, Middle East and India.

- DFI Europe was formed in 2005 as a DFI Regional Chapter for European DFI Members, who enjoy the benefits of joint DFI and DFI Europe membership. DFI Europe’s secretariat is located in Belgium.
- DFI Middle East was formed in 2010 following a successful Piling Summit in Dubai, UAE. The Regional Chapter provides joint membership in DFI and DFI Middle East.
- DFI of India was formed in 2013 following the success of the Deep Foundation Technologies for Infrastructure Development in India held in Chennai, India in 2012. The Regional Chapter provides joint membership in DFI and DFI of India.
