= National Library Service for the Blind and Print Disabled =

Free library program in the U.S.

The National Library Service for the Blind and Print Disabled (NLS) is a free library program of braille and audio materials such as books and magazines circulated to eligible borrowers in the United States and American citizens living abroad by postage-free mail and online download. The program is sponsored by the Library of Congress. People may be eligible if they are blind, have a visual disability that prevents them from reading normal print, or a physical disability that keeps them from holding a book. Library materials are distributed to regional and subregional libraries and then circulated to eligible patrons. In total there are 55 regional libraries, 32 subregional libraries, and 14 advisory and outreach centers serving the United States and its territories: the District of Columbia, Puerto Rico, the U.S. Virgin Islands, and Guam.

== History ==
The NLS was established by an act of Congress called the Pratt–Smoot Act and began operation on July 1, 1931. The program was amended in 1934 to include sound recordings (talking books), in 1952 to include blind children, in 1962 to include music materials, and in 1966 to include individuals with physical impairments that prevent the reading of standard print. In 2016, the NLS was permitted to provide refreshable braille displays.

The Chafee amendment of 1996 (Chafee) added title 17 United States Code section 121 to the copyright portion of US law; section 121 established specific limitations on the exclusive rights in copyrighted works. The amendment allows authorized entities to reproduce or distribute copies or phonorecords of previously published nondramatic literary works in specialized formats exclusively for use by blind or other persons with disabilities. The definition of authorized entities under Chafee includes any "nonprofit organization or a governmental agency that has a primary mission to provide specialized services relating to training, education, or adaptive reading or information access needs of blind or other persons with disabilities." A "nonprofit organization" is understood to mean an organization that has been granted nonprofit tax exemption under section 501(c)(3) of the Internal Revenue Code. The NLS notes that this authority to make or distribute copies may be delegated to "volunteers, special education teachers, and commercial producers."

== Limits on access ==
Confirmation from a "certifying authority" is required to qualify for service with the NLS. In cases of blindness, visual impairment and/or physical limitations Doctors of Medicine (M.D.); Doctors of Osteopathic Medicine (D.O.); ophthalmologists; optometrists; registered nurses; professional librarians; therapists; and professional staff of hospitals, institutions, and welfare agencies are able to satisfy this requirement.

=== Blindness and visual impairments ===
In order to qualify for service through the NLS, blind people must have vision that is 20/200 or less in the better eye with correcting lenses or whose widest diameter of visual field subtends an angular distance no greater than 20 degrees. People may also qualify for services if they are visually impaired and unable to read standard print materials.

=== Physical limitations ===
Persons with physical limitations that hinder their ability to read standard print materials also qualify for service with the NLS.

=== Learning disabilities ===
Although the definition of learning disabilities may include reading disabilities, dyslexia, problems with spoken language, writing, and reasoning ability, Public Law 89–522 states that NLS materials will be loans to readers that have a "reading disability resulting from organic dysfunction," and requires certification from a medical doctor. An individual whose reading disability is not physically based is not eligible for services.

=== Foreign access ===
The NLS is for residents of the United States or American citizens only. Blind individuals in other countries or foreign libraries serving the blind do not have direct borrowing privileges, although some materials may be made available through inter-library loan, when permission from the publisher or author has been obtained.

== BARD ==
Another way for eligible patrons to listen to materials is through the Braille and Audio Reading Download (BARD) service. This service provided by the NLS is a web-based service that provides access to thousands of braille and encrypted audio books, magazines, and music scores. Any person who is eligible for the NLS mail service can sign up for BARD online, although they will need to be enrolled in the NLS program first. Once transferred onto a USB flash drive, downloaded talking books and magazines can be played on the digital talking-book machine provided free of charge by NLS. BARD can also be accessed on mobile devices via the BARD Mobile app.

== Foreign languages ==
The NLS also has materials for those who are eligible that speak a different language. Audio recordings of magazines, braille books, and audio books materials are available. The collections include German, French, and Spanish materials. These, however, are just some of the foreign language items that are offered. Foreign producers provide the organization with several of these items and the NLS house these collections at the NLS Multistate Center East. Many of the Spanish audio and braille books, though, are produced by NLS themselves. These are among the materials that can be retrieved through Inter Library Loan and by mail. The website for The National Library Service for the Blind and Physically Handicapped also gives links to other foreign language materials and resources.

== Music materials ==
The NLS music collection, authorized by Congress in 1962, includes braille and large-print musical scores, recorded instructional materials, and recorded materials about music and musicians. Anyone who is eligible for NLS service is able to utilize the NLS music materials. However, patrons cannot get the materials from their local libraries, instead getting them from the NLS headquarters in Washington D.C. directly.

== Publication ==
News (ISSN 1046-1663) is a quarterly publication published by the NLS; it is associated with libraries serving blind and print disabled readers, and their cooperating agencies.

== See also ==
- American Printing House for the Blind
- Books for the Blind
- Bookshare
- Learning Ally (formerly Recording for the Blind & Dyslexic)
- Web Content Accessibility Guidelines
- West German Audio Book Library for the Blind
