= Print disability =

Disability that impedes people from reading print

A print-disabled person is "a person who cannot effectively read print because of a visual, physical, perceptual, developmental, cognitive, or learning disability" that impede the ability to read or manipulate books and other print media. A print disability prevents a person from gaining information from printed material in the standard way, and requires them to utilize alternative methods to access that information. Print disabilities include various visual impairments, learning disabilities, and physical disabilities. Chemical sensitivities or allergic reactions to ink or paper can also be considered print disabilities. The term was coined by George Kerscher, a pioneer in digital talking books.

In June 2013, the World Intellectual Property Organization (WIPO) held a conference in Marrakesh, Morocco, during which they adopted a special treaty called "A Treaty to Facilitate Access to Published Works by Visually Impaired Persons and Persons with Print Disabilities" (briefly Marrakesh VIP Treaty).

== Accessibility ==
Accessibility for people with print disabilities can take various forms, and readers may choose one or multiple depending on their individual disabilities, personal preferences, and the content being read.

Print media is often converted into audio format, such as an audiobook or talking book. DAISY is a common digital audio format used by libraries, especially for complex texts. Screen readers and speech synthesis software are also used to convert digital text, especially web-based text, into auditory format.

Large print can be helpful for people with low vision, visual impairments, or intellectual disabilities. Most books and other print materials for adults use 10- to 12-point font, while large print media generally uses 14- to 18-point font. Many public libraries carry large print books.

Braille is a tactile format; words are spelled out through arrangements of raised dots which can be read through touch. Braille can be produced in the form of embossed paper (using specialized printers or typewriters), produced by hand through slate and stylus, or digitally through refreshable braille displays.

People with dyslexia may benefit from the use of dyslexia fonts.

== Initiatives ==
The Accessible Books Consortium (ABC) launched in 2014, was conceived as "one possible initiative, among others, to concretely achieve the goals of the Marrakesh Treaty". ABC aims to increase the number of books worldwide in accessible formats and to make them available to people who are print disabled.

== See also ==
- Radio Print Handicapped Network
