= West German Audio Book Library for the Blind =

Largest German library producing and lending audiobooks for visually impaired persons

Coordinates: 51°55′26.00″N 7°33′43.50″E

West German Audio Book Library for the Blind Westdeutsche Blindenhörbücherei (WBH)
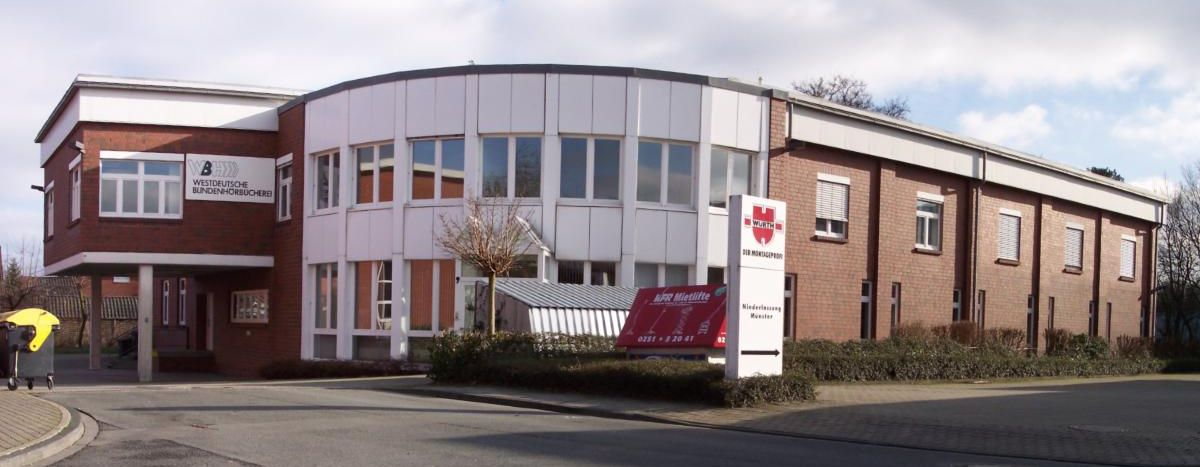
- Location: Münster, Germany, Germany
- Established: 1955

Collection
- Size: 24,500

Access and use
- Access requirements: Certification of visual impairment
- Circulation: 240,000

Other information
- Director: Siegfried Volkert
- Employees: 17
- Website: www.wbh-online.de

The West German Audio Book Library for the Blind (German: Westdeutsche Blindenhörbücherei e. V.), abbreviated WBH, is a specialist library which produces and distributes audiobooks and periodicals for blind and partially sighted persons. It is the largest library of its kind in the German speaking world. The WBH supplies a nationwide network of libraries for the visually impaired, primarily in the western German states of North Rhine-Westphalia, Rhineland-Palatinate and the Saarland, but also to other states and abroad.

The WBH was founded in 1955 at the Public Library of Münster, Germany. Actors from the municipal theater recorded the first audio books in an improvised studio lined with egg cartons. Because trams rattled past during the day, these first productions took place at night. Later, texts were recorded by trained speakers, processed by the library, then distributed to users by mail. Until the 1970s recordings were on tape reels, then later compact tape cassettes. Since 2004, the offerings have been recorded in the DAISY Digital Talking Book MP3 standard, which allows visually impaired users to both listen and navigate written material. In 2009 the library's collection became exclusively digital as cassette tapes were no longer made available.

Today about 24,500 titles from the classics, mystery, biographies, nonfiction, plays and popular novels are available to users. Thirty professional freelance speakers record 350 new titles annually in the library's own studio, which are then digitally mastered and cataloged. The WBH is legally permitted to record any book published in Germany for free, including such popular titles as Harry Potter. The library loans audio books on CD at no charge, while audio magazines and newspapers are made available on a subscription basis. Proof of visual impairment is required to access the library's services. In many places in Germany the local blind association helps users register.

== See also ==
- Digital accessible information system, technical standard for audiobooks etc.
- German Central Library for the Blind
- List of libraries in Germany
