= Digital Accessible Information System =

Technical standard for digital audiobooks, periodicals and computerized text

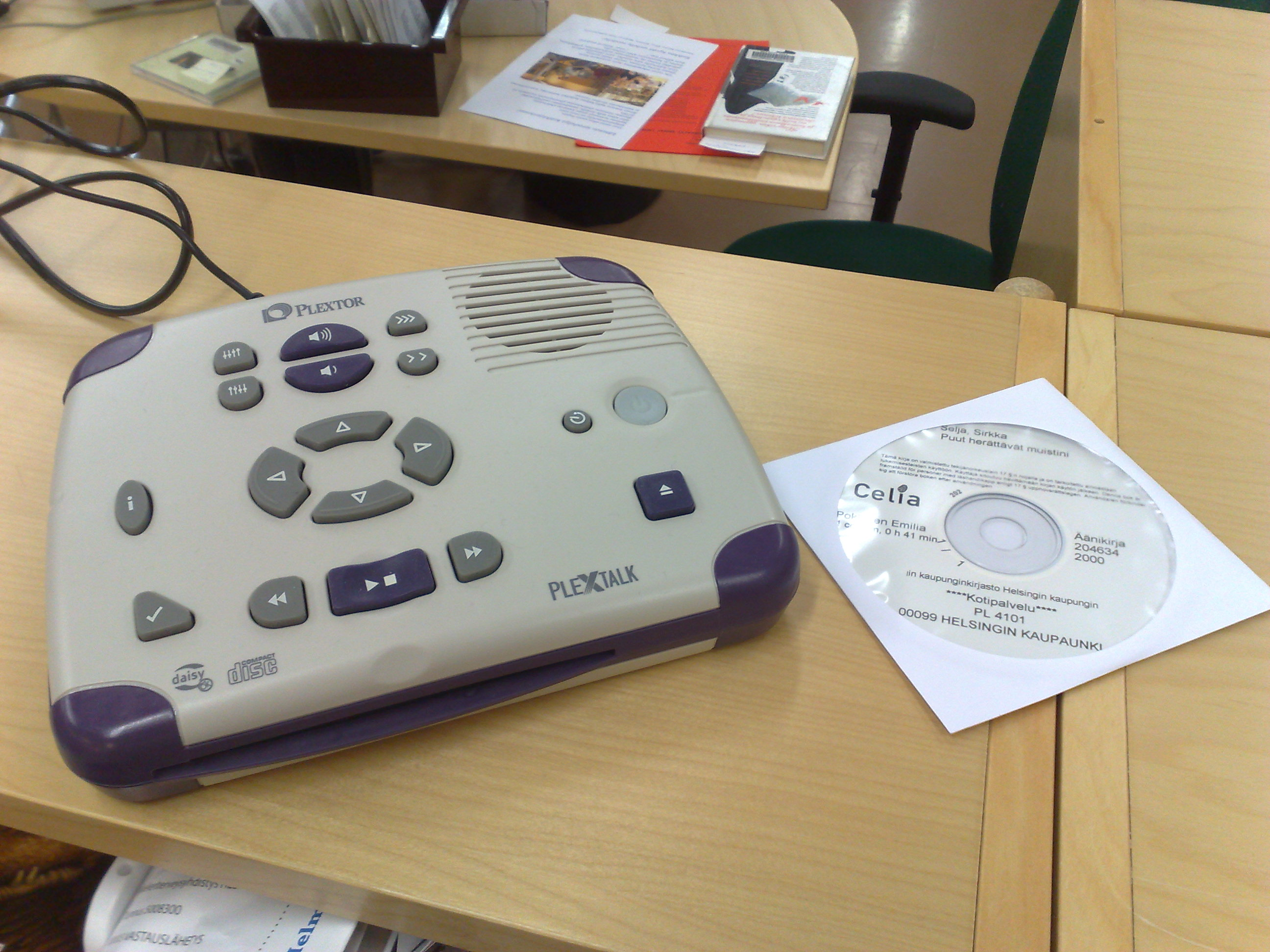
A DAISY player and audio book from Plextor

Digital accessible information system (DAISY) is a technical standard for digital audiobooks, periodicals, and computerized text. DAISY is designed to be a complete audio substitute for print material and is specifically designed for use by people with print disabilities, including blindness, impaired vision, and dyslexia. Based on the MP3 and XML formats, the DAISY format has advanced features in addition to those of a traditional audiobook. Users can search, place bookmarks, precisely navigate line by line, and regulate the speaking speed without distortion. DAISY also provides aurally accessible tables, references, and additional information. As a result, DAISY allows visually impaired listeners to navigate something as complex as an encyclopedia or textbook, otherwise impossible using conventional audio recordings.

DAISY multimedia can be a book, magazine, newspaper, journal, computerized text, or a synchronized presentation of text and audio. It provides up to six embedded "navigation levels" for content, including embedded objects such as images, graphics, and MathML. In the DAISY standard, navigation is enabled within a sequential and hierarchical structure consisting of (marked-up) text synchronized with audio. The original DAISY 2 specification (1998) was based on HTML and SMIL. The DAISY 2.02 revision (2001) was based on XHTML and SMIL. DAISY 3 (2005) is based on XML and is standardized as ANSI/NISO Z39.86-2005.

The DAISY Consortium was founded in 1996 and consists of international organizations committed to developing equitable access to information for people who have a print disability. The consortium was selected by the National Information Standards Organization (NISO) as the official maintenance agency for the DAISY/NISO Standard.

== Specification ==
A Digital Talking Book (DTB) is a collection of electronic files arranged to present information to the target population via alternative media, namely, human or synthetic speech, refreshable Braille, or visual display, e.g., large print. The DTB files comprising the DAISY format is

- Package File: A set of metadata describing the DTB
- Textual content file: Contains the text of the document in XML
- Audio Files: human or synthetic speech MP3 recordings
- Image files: for visual displays
- Synchronization files: synchronizes the different media files of the DTB during playback
- Navigation control file: for viewing the document's hierarchical structure
- Bookmark/Highlight file: support to user-set highlights
- Resource file: for playback management
- Distribution Information File: maps each SMIL file to a specific media unit

== Access to materials ==
Since DAISY is often used by people with disabilities, many of the existing organizations which produce accessible versions of copyrighted content are moving to the DAISY standard, and slowly moving away from more traditional methods of distribution such as cassette tape.

In the United States, Learning Ally, AMAC Accessibility, Bookshare, the Internet Archive and the National Library Service for the Blind and Print Disabled (NLS), among others, offer content to blind and visually impaired individuals. Learning Ally and Bookshare also allows access by those with dyslexia or other disabilities which impair the person's ability to read print. The NLS uses a library methodology, on the basis that the books are loaned (as they traditionally have been, on physical cassette), hence they are able to offer content free of charge, just as any public library can. Learning Ally and Bookshare both are subscription-based services. Bookshare membership is free to U.S. students due to funding from the U.S. Department of Education.

Content from both the NLS and the Learning Ally organizations uses the DAISY Protected Digital Book (PDTB) encryption standard. The basic structure of the DAISY definition files remains the same, however, the audio itself, and in some cases certain information tags in the DAISY SMIL files, are encrypted and must be decrypted in order to be read/played back. The organization which offers the content provides a decryption key to the user, which can be installed into a DAISY player to allow decryption. As the encryption schemes are not part of the core DAISY standard, only players which specifically implement the necessary algorithms and key management will be able to access these titles. Bookshare utilizes its own digital rights management plan including fingerprinting each digital book with the identity of the downloading user. These actions are done to comply with law 17 U.S.C. § 121 requiring copyrighted material to be distributed in a specialized format to prevent unauthorized individuals, such as those who do not have a qualifying disability, from accessing the materials.

== Playback and production ==
DAISY books can be heard on standalone DAISY players, computers using DAISY playback software, mobile phones, and MP3 players (with limited navigation). DAISY books can be distributed on a CD/DVD, memory card or through the Internet.

A computerized text DAISY book can be read using refreshable braille display or screen-reading software, printed as braille book on paper, converted to a talking book using synthesized voice or a human narration, and also printed on paper as large print book. In addition, it can be read as large print text on computer screen.

== See also ==
- Accessible publishing
- Books for the Blind
- Chakshumathi
- Design for All (in ICT)
- DTBook
- West German Audio Book Library for the Blind
