= List of screen readers =

This is a comparison of some screen reader programs.

== Current screen readers ==
Screen reader	Creator	Supported platforms	License	Notes
BRLTTY	The BRLTTY Team	Unix-like, Windows console, DOS, Android	Free and open source (GPL2)	Available to download; part of most Linux distributions
ChromeVox	Google	ChromeOS or, with a speech processor, Linux, Mac, Windows	Free	ChromeVox is a screen reader for Chrome and ChromeOS. The ChromeVox Classic Chrome extension is in maintenance-only mode. The ChromeVox website has more information on the transition to the version bundled with ChromeOS.
Emacspeak	T. V. Raman	Emacs (on Unix-like systems)	Free and open source	Turns Emacs into a "complete audio desktop".
iZoom	Issist	Windows	Commercial	Screen magnifier with low-vision speech capabilities. Includes support for Mozilla Firefox.
JAWS	Freedom Scientific	Windows and DOS	Commercial for Windows; freeware for DOS	Includes support for MSAA, the Java Access Bridge, and PDF.
Microsoft Narrator	Microsoft	Windows	Free, Commercial	Bundled with recent versions of Windows, this basic screen reader makes use of MSAA.
Microsurf	Microsurf	All that run Chrome browser	Free	Microsurf is a screen reader for Chrome
NonVisual Desktop Access (NVDA)	NonVisual Desktop Access project	Windows	Free and open source (GPL2)	Programmed and scriptable in Python. Supports Mozilla Firefox, Microsoft Internet Explorer, Word, Excel and Outlook Express, and Mozilla Thunderbird. Supports web content using JavaScript. Supports Java Access Bridge. IAccessible2 is supported.
Orca	GNOME	Unix-like	Free and open source ( LGPL 2.1)	The development of Orca was started by Sun Microsystems as part of the GNOME project with contributions from many community members, but since Oracle acquired Sun Microsystems in 2010, Orca turned into a completely community-driven project. It supports AT-SPI, so it works with the GNOME desktop, Mozilla Firefox/Thunderbird, OpenOffice/LibreOffice and GTK+, KDE/Qt and Java Swing/SWT applications. Though it is developed by the GNOME project, it is the most popular screen reader for Unix like systems with graphical environments other than GNOME, like KDE or Unity.
PC-Talker	Kochi System Development	Windows	Commercial	Japanese screen reader. Supports MSAA and Flash.
PCVoz	EzHermatic	Windows	Commercial	Available to buy or download trial. Supports MSAA.
Dolphin ScreenReader (formerly Hal)	Dolphin Computer Access	Windows	Commercial	Includes a screen magnifier and output to Braille devices. 30 day free trial available for download. Supports MSAA, UIA, the Java Access Bridge, and PDF.
Simply Talker	EcoNet International	Windows	Commercial	Trial download available.
TalkBack	Google	Android 1.6+	Open Source	Use with SoundBack and kickback
TalkButton	Upward Spiral Software	Mac	Commercial	TalkButton works together with Microsoft Word to create an extensive text-to-speech environment. Features include highlighting of spoken text and keyboard echo. Trial version available.
Text to Speech	SpeakComputers.com	Windows	Freeware	A free program that converts written text into spoken words or even written text into MP3 files.; Seven programs: Text to speech: Reader, Web browser, Mini Clipboard reader, Image Presentation, Appointment Reminder, Speaking Clock, Parental Controls
Thunder ScreenReader	Sensory Software	Windows	Freeware	Last update 2015. Supports MSAA.
VoiceOver	Apple Inc.	Mac OS X, iPhone, iPad, Apple Watch, iPods, and Apple TV	Free, Commercial	Free and included with any Apple product. No installation or setup required. Available in over 30 language voices, which are also included for free. See Apple Accessibility for more information.
VoiceView	Amazon	Fire OS	Free, Commercial	Included with Amazon Fire tablets
WebAnywhere	University of Washington	Web	Free and Open Source (new BSD)	Does not require any software installation to run so can be used at any public terminal that has sound available. Works on any platform.
WinZoom	Clarity	Windows	Commercial	Screen reader with magnifier. USB version does not require any installation and can be used on any public computer.
Screen Access for All	National Association for the Blind, New Delhi	Windows	Open source	Last update: 2004
ZoomText	Freedom Scientific, formerly Ai Squared	Windows	Commercial	Includes a screen magnifier. Trial download available.
Screen reader	Creator	Supported platforms	License	Notes

== Discontinued and/or obsoleted screen readers ==
Screen reader	Creator	Supported platforms	License	Notes
95Reader	SSCT	Windows	Commercial	Japanese screen reader; latest version (ver. 6.0, release date unknown) has specific support for Internet Explorer 6 and Macromedia Flash 6, so seems obsolete and its availability seems unlikely to change.
ASAP (Automatic Screen Access Program)	MicroTalk	DOS	Commercial	
ASAW (Automatic Screen Access for Windows)	MicroTalk	Windows	Commercial	
Blindows	BAUM Retec (formerly Audiodata)	Windows	Commercial	Substituted by COBRA
COBRA	BAUM Retec	Windows	Commercial	Supports Microsoft Active Accessibility (MSAA) and the Java Access Bridge.
DRACULA family	Eurobraille	Windows	Commercial	
Enable Reader Professional Speech System	Enable Talking Software	DOS	Uncertain	
Enhanced PC Talking Program	Computer Conversations	DOS	Uncertain	
Gnopernicus	GNOME	Unix-like	Free and open source (LGPL 2)	It was developed by BAUM Engineering, a partner company of Baum Retec AG. Used to be bundled with GNOME, but it was replaced by Orca in GNOME 2.16. Included a screen magnifier. It supported AT-SPI.
HAL	Dolphin Computer Access	Windows, DOS	Commercial	Windows version was superseded by SuperNova and Dolphin ScreenReader
HT Reader	HT Visual	Windows	Commercial	Included support for MSAA and PDF. Disappeared from the price list of HT Visual, absolutely no other sign of it being available
Leitor de Telas	MC / CPqD	Windows	Free	Brazilian Portuguese screen reader. MSAA support. Latest info about it is from December 2007
Linux Screen Reader (LSR)	GNOME	Unix-like	Free and open source (New BSD License)	It was an alternative screen reader to Orca led by IBM started in 2006. However, it was ceased in 2007 when IBM focused their resources in other projects. It supported AT-SPI.
LookOUT	Choice Technology	Windows	Commercial	Was also available integrated with a screen magnifier. Last mention of it is from 2003.
Mercator/UltraSonix	Georgia Institute of Technology	X Window System/Linux	Educational, Non-commercial	More information at Georgia Tech's College of Computing Past Projects and "An Architecture for Transforming Graphical Interfaces" (1994) by W. Keith Edwards and Elizabeth D. Mynatt.
Metalmouth	Evaluera Ltd.	All that run Chrome browser	Free and open source (Apache 2.0)	No announcement about discontinuation. Last updated in 2014 and not available in the Chrome Web Store anymore.
Model T Reader	Dolphin Computer Access	DOS	Freeware	
Pocket Hal	Dolphin Computer Access	Windows Mobile PDA and PDA Phones	Commercial	
PROVOX	Kansys, Inc.	DOS	Uncertain	
Screen Reader	Research Centre for the Education of the Visually Handicapped (RCEVH)	BBC Micro and NEC portable		
Screen Reader/2	IBM	OS/2	Commercial	
Smart Hal	Dolphin Computer Access	Windows Mobile and WM Smartphone	Commercial	
Soft Vert	TeleSensory Systems	DOS	Commercial	
SUSE-Blinux	Novell	Linux	Free and open source	
System Access	Serotek	Windows	Commercial	Trial download available. Supports Microsoft Internet Explorer (including DHTML/Ajax and Flash), Outlook Express, Outlook, Word, Excel, PowerPoint, Skype, and Adobe Reader. No support for Java yet.
Talks & Zooms	Nuance Communications	Symbian OS Series 60 3rd and 5th Ed and Symbian 3	Commercial	Presentation and free trial version to be found on the site. The discontinuation of Symbian OS in 2013 made this obsolete.
TeleTender	TeleTender.org	All Platforms: Windows, Linux, Mac OS X, iPhone, iPad, iPods, Windows, Android etc..	Free	TeleTender is a voice communication platform for sight impaired people, embedded with a cloud based screen reader. Users can interact with any web pages on the internet by issuing voice commands over the phone. To use it, just dial one of its access numbers.
Tinytalk	OMS Development	DOS and perhaps Windows	SHARE WARE	
Virgo	BAUM Retec AG	Windows	Commercial	Substituted by COBRA.
Window Bridge	Syntha-voice Computers (now out of business)	Windows	Commercial	
Window-Eyes	GW Micro (merged with AI Squared in 2014, acquired by VFO Group, later Vispero, in 2016)	Windows	Commercial	As of 2017, no longer available for sale.
WinVision	Artic Technologies	Windows	Commercial	Not officially discontinued, but there has been no further release since 1997.
Screen reader	Creator	Supported platforms	License	Notes

== Software aids for people with reading difficulties ==
- Automatik Text Reader from Davide Baldini (Firefox extension)
- Balabolka from Ilya Morozov
- BrowseAloud from Texthelp Systems Inc
- Capture Assistant from Renovation Software
- ClaroRead from Claro Software
- Claro ScreenRuler Suite from Claro Software
- ClickHear from gh LLC
- ClickHear Mobile from gh LLC
- ClipSpeak (last update: 2009) from Daniel Innala Ahlmark
- EasyTutor from Dolphin Computer Access
- EnVision: basic multi-featured Windows accessibility tool
- Kurzweil 1000 (for the visually impaired) and Kurzweil 3000-firefly (for those with reading or writing difficulty) from Kurzweil Educational Systems
- Penfriend from Penfriend Ltd
- ReadHear from gh LLC
- ReadSpeaker from ReadSpeaker Holding B.V.
- Read & Write from TextHelp Systems
- ReadPlease from ReadPlease Corporation
- Read:OutLoud from Don Johnston, Inc.
- Screen Reader from SourceBinary.com (no longer available, latest trial version can be obtained from other download sites)
- SodelsCot from Sodels Factory
- TextAloud from NextUp.com
- Ultra Hal TTS Reader from Zabaware, Inc.
- yRead from Spacejock Software
