= Self-voicing =

Function where an application provides an in-built aural interface

A self-voicing application is an application that provides an aural interface without requiring a separate screen reader. Self-voicing applications can be an important form of assistive technology, useful to those who have difficulty reading or seeing.

A prominent group of self-voicing applications are talking web browsers. Traditionally, talking web browsers have been specially created, as was the case with:

- pwWebSpeak, originally developed by The Productivity Works in Princeton, New Jersey (now obsolete)
- Simply Web (also now obsolete)
- Home Page Reader (HPR) from IBM (recently discontinued)
- Connect Outloud from Freedom Scientific
- WebAnywhere from University of Washington

A more recent trend has seen the self-voicing capabilities added to mainstream web browsers with free add-ons. In 2004, Opera Software created a self-voicing and speech-recognition extension for the Windows version of their web browser. And in 2005 Charles L. Chen devised Fire Vox, an extension that adds speech capabilities to the Mozilla Firefox web browser on Mac, Windows, or Linux.

A second important category are broader self-voicing applications that function as what T. V. Raman calls "complete audio desktops", including editing, browsing, and even gaming capabilities. These include Raman's own Emacspeak enhancement for Emacs.
