= Automatic =

Automatic may refer to:

== Music ==
=== Bands ===
- Automatic (Australian band), Australian rock band
- Automatic (American band), American rock band
- The Automatic, a Welsh alternative rock band

=== Albums ===
- Automatic (Jack Bruce album), a 1983 electronic rock album
- Automatic (Sharpe & Numan album), a 1989 synthpop album
- Automatic (The Jesus and Mary Chain album), a 1989 alternative rock album
- Automatic (Dweezil Zappa album), a 2000 hard rock album, or the title song
- Automatic (Stitches album), a 2006 punk rock album, or the title song
- Automatic (VNV Nation album), a 2011 futurepop album
- Automatic (Don Broco album), a 2015 rock album
- Automatic (Kaskade album), 2015 album by Kaskade
- Automatic (Mildlife album), 2020 album by Mildlife
- Automatic, a 1997 electronic album by Le Car
- Automatic, a 2003 punk rock album by The Turbo A.C.'s
- Automatic, a 2013 reggae-rock album by Iration
- Automatic, a 2023 rock album by Rick Springfield

=== Songs ===
- "Automatic" (Danny Fernandes song), 2010
- "Automatic" (The Get Up Kids song), 2011
- "Automatic" (Miranda Lambert song), 2014
- "Automatic" (Nicki Minaj song), 2012
- "Automatic" (Pointer Sisters song), 1984
- "Automatic" (Red Velvet song), 2015 song by Red Velvet
- "Automatic" (Sarah Whatmore song), 2003
- "Automatic" (Tokio Hotel song), 2009
- "Automatic" (Hikaru Utada song), 1998
- "Automatic", a song by 808 State from the 1988 album Prebuild
- "Automatic", a song by Birdy on the 2023 album Portraits
- "Automatic", a song by The Dismemberment Plan on the 2001 album Change
- "Automatic", a song by Denzel Curry on the 2019 album Zuu
- "Automatic", a song by The Red Devils on the 1992 album King King (album)
- "Automatic", a song by Less Than Jake on the 1996 album Losing Streak
- "Automatic", a song by Lagwagon on the 2005 album Resolve
- "Automatic", a song by Weezer on the 2008 album Weezer
- "Automatic", a song by Nicki Minaj on the 2012 album Pink Friday: Roman Reloaded
- "Automatic", a song by Amaranthe on the 2011 album Amaranthe
- "Automatic", a song by Red Velvet on the 2015 mini album Ice Cream Cake (EP)
- "Automatic", a 2009 song by Teairra Marí
- "Automatic", a song by Chancellor, Babylon, twlv, Moon, Bibi, and Jiselle, 2020
- "Automatic", 2019 song by Miquela
- "Automatic", by Prince on his 1982 album 1999

== Technology ==
- Automatic transmission, or a car with an automatic transmission
- Automatic knife, or Switchblade
- Automatic firearm
- Automatic variable
- Automatic watch
- Automatic (automobile company), a defunct American automobile company

== Film ==
- Automatic (1995 film), an action film featuring Dennis Lipscomb
- Automatic (2001 film), featuring Mel Jackson

== Other uses ==
- Bruce Vanderveer, American music producer professionally known as Automatic

== See also ==
- Automat (disambiguation)
- Automata (disambiguation)
- Automaticity
- Automatik (disambiguation)
- Automation (disambiguation)
- Automaton
- Automattic, a web development corporation
