= Ted Henter =

American computer programmer and businessman

- Nationality: (United States) American
- Born: 1950 (age 75–76); Panama Canal Zone
Motorcycle racing career statistics
250cc World Championship
Active years	1978
Manufacturers	Yamaha
Championships	0
1978 championship position	23rd
Starts / Wins / Podiums / Poles / F. laps / Points; 1 / 0 / 0 / 0 / 0 / 3

Ted Henter (born 1950 in Panama Canal Zone) is an American computer programmer and businessperson known for having invented the JAWS screen reader for the blind. He studied engineering, but learned computer programming and started his own business after becoming blind in a car accident in 1978, which put an end to a promising career as an international motorcycle racer.

In 1987, Henter teamed up with businessperson Bill Joyce, who together founded Henter-Joyce in St. Petersburg, Florida. Henter was president and led the operation and provided technology direction while Joyce acted as a silent partner. Henter-Joyce produced JAWS, a screen reader for personal computers using MS-DOS, and later Microsoft Windows.

After becoming blind, Henter rediscovered waterskiing, and started competing in waterskiing events. He won six times out of seven competitions in the United States and twice in international competition. He retired in 1991 after winning the overall Gold medal in the United States and World Championship for Disabled Skiers.

Henter-Joyce merged with Arkenstone and Blazie Engineering in 2000 to form Freedom Scientific. Henter currently remains on the board of directors of Freedom Scientific, and in 2002 he founded Henter Math, to produce software that helps the "pencil-impaired" with mathematics.

== Career statistics ==
=== Grand Prix motorcycle racing ===
(key) (Races in bold indicate pole position; races in italics indicate fastest lap)

Year	Class	Bike	1	2	3	4	5	6	7	8	9	10	11	12	Pos	Points
1978	250 cc	Yamaha	VEN; 8	ESP	FRA	NAT	NED	BEL	SWE	FIN	GBR	GER	CZE	YUG	23rd	3
