= Sitecues =

sitecues
- Type: Internet company
- Industry: Software as a service
- Founded: February 4, 2014
- Headquarters: Cambridge, Massachusetts, USA
- Area served: Worldwide
- Key people: David Wu (CEO)
- Products: sitecues
- Parent: Ai Squared
- Website: www.sitecues.com

sitecues was a Web-based (software as a service) solution that built zoom and speech features into websites. The product enhanced accessibility and usability for website visitors who experience visual and print difficulties. The site was launched by Ai Squared, the makers of ZoomText and assistive software. Sitecues served over 100 customers, among which included several California State Universities, other large universities and libraries in the US, as well as some Federal and State government bodies. Sitecues is no longer offered as a product, although it predated many similar web-based accessibility overlays.

== Overview ==
The product provides a badge that appears at the top bar of the browser and can be used by users having visual and print difficulties to zoom/magnify or listen to the selected text when browsing.

== Partnerships ==
In May 2014, Ai Squared, the maker of sitecues and ZoomText, and GW Micro, the creator of Window-Eyes, merged into one company. Later, Ai Squared was purchased by Vispero.

== See also ==
- Assistive technology service provider
