= LSR =

LSR may refer to:

== Computing ==
- Label switch router, a type of router located in the middle of an MPLS network
- Lego Stunt Rally, a video game
- Link-state routing protocol, one of the two main classes of routing protocols used in packet switching networks
- Linux Screen Reader, a free and open source assistive technology of the GNOME desktop environment
- Logical shift right, a type of logical shift operator used in some computer languages
- Loose Source Routing, an IP routing option used for mobility in IP networks
- Link state request, a type of OSPF protocol message

== Organizations ==
- LSR Group, one of Russia's largest construction firms
- Lady Shri Ram College for Women, a university in Delhi, India
- League for Socialist Reconstruction, a DeLeonist political organization in the United States
- League for Social Reconstruction, a socialist think-tank in Canada which ran from 1931 to 1942
- Leeds Student Radio, a student radio station based in Leeds
- Liberdade, Socialismo e Revolução, a Brazilian socialist organization
- Life Sciences Research, the U.S. incorporation of Huntingdon Life Sciences
- LifeRing Secular Recovery, an addiction recovery support group
- Freedom of Russia Legion (Legion "Svoboda Rossii")

== Sciences ==
- Local standard of rest, a frame of reference for motion of matter in the Milky Way galaxy proximate to the Sun
- Land speed record, the record for highest speed by a land vehicle
- Liquid silicone rubber, a form of silicone rubber
- Lipolysis-stimulated lipoprotein receptor

== Other ==
- LSR (sniper rifle), a Pakistani sniper rifle
- Local storm report, a product issued by the U.S. National Weather Service
- A type of equipment on the Israel television show HaShminiya
