= ZoomText =

Screen magnifier for Windows

ZoomText is a screen magnifier for Windows developed by Ai Squared which was acquired by Freedom Scientific in 2016. The first version was released for MS-DOS in 1988, and the first version for Windows was released in 1991. ZoomText is available in two editions: ZoomText Magnifier and ZoomText Magnifier/Reader, which includes a built-in screen reader.

The latest version of ZoomText is ZoomText 2026.2605.28 released in May 2026.

== Features ==
ZoomText is a stand-alone piece of software designed for visually impaired people. It is available for the currently released and supported versions of Microsoft Windows operating systems. The program allows the user to see and hear everything on the computer screen and provides access to applications, documents, email and the Internet. The software is intended to help individuals with "early vision loss, computer vision syndrome, and visual impairments such as macular degeneration and glaucoma". ZoomText has dual monitor support and is capable of magnifying the screen up to 60 times; it also allows the user to choose which part of the screen is magnified. Text definition is maintained to preserve legibility. Color controls help improve the clarity of the screen and mouse pointers can be resized. It also provides enhanced navigation capabilities to help the user to launch programs and find documents on the desktop and find the hypertext links and controls on web pages, find words or phrases. In Windows Vista, magnification and screen reader support is enabled at the log on stage.

== History ==
ZoomText was produced and developed by AiSquared, which is based in Vermont, United States, until 2016. Since then the development and testing was merged in with the team from Freedom Scientific who have provided JAWS since the 1990s. The product has been developed for over 25 years and is currently available in over 20 language versions.

== Release history ==
Version 11 was released in 2017.

Version 2018 was released early 2018.

Version 2019 was released in late 2018.

Version 2020 was released in late 2019.

Version 2021 was released in late 2020.

Version 2022 was released in late 2021.

Version 2023 was released in late 2022.

Version 2026.2605.28 was released in mid-2026.

Updates on current release versions are now published between 4 and 6 weeks apart.

== See also ==
- List of screen readers
