= Sound man =

Sound man or Soundman may refer to:

- Audio engineer, working on the technical aspects of sound recording
- Production sound mixer, responsible for recording all sound recording on set during the filmmaking or television production
- Soundman (rank), a former U.S. Navy rank for a sonar technician
- Soundman Vol. 1, a studio album by Starboy Entertainment
- Sound Man: WWII to MP3, a 2006 documentary on magnetic tape sound recording pioneer, Jack Mullin
- Sound Man, a 2014 autobiography by English music producer Glyn Johns

== See also ==
- Sound Manager, Apple software
