= Mouse bungee =

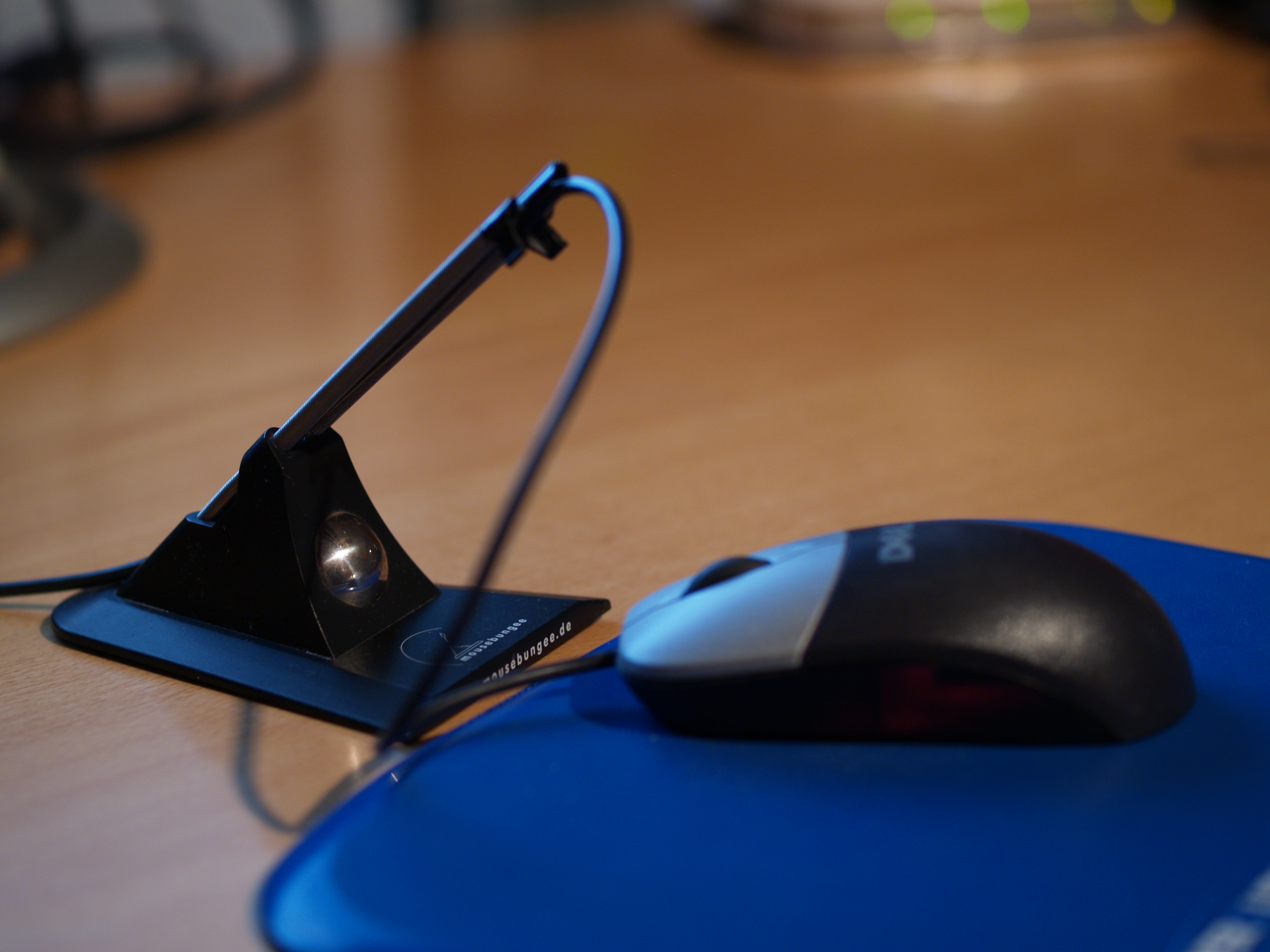
A computer mouse using a mouse bungee

A mouse bungee is a device that secures the cable of a computer mouse, preventing the cable from tangling and providing full freedom of movement. It can be made out of plastic, metal, or silicon fabricated tools. In 1994 they were mostly used in offices, but as of 2010 their popularity rose within the gaming industry, and they are now mostly marketed to esports players.

== Functionality ==
The mouse bungee consists of a wide, stable base plate with non-slip bottom and a crane-like, oblique, sprung clamp for the cable, which rises about 10 cm high. In plastic frames a stabilisation weight is incorporated, which ensures the necessary weight. Ideally, it is in front of the computer and the cable length is manually set so that the entire mouse pad can be easily reached with the mouse, but does not create unnecessary loops in the cable. The back of the cable remains still on the table without causing an annoyance. Some of the models also include a USB hub, which requires adding an additional input cable from the computer to use, but can offer several output options.

== History ==
Although DIY cord holders were popular since the introduction of corded computer mice, the first dedicated product came from the company Mouse Bungee, represented by the CEO Ed Larkin. Back in 1994, he introduced a simple solution which offered a mouse cord holder and a mouse pad. Since the idea didn't flourish within the business world, the company sold the project to Razer Inc. in 2010.

Later that year Razer introduced a revised version without a mouse pad, and the product ended up as the current market leader within the field of Gaming Mouse Bungees. At that point the trend was created and other companies started following it. Soon enough all the major manufacturers of computer peripherals joined the market with their solution, and today there are over 20 different products on the market.

== See also ==
- Computer accessibility
- Computer mouse
- Computer
