= Nas Campanella =

Australian journalist

Nas Campanella is an Australian journalist. She is the National Disability Affairs Reporter for the Australian Broadcasting Corporation, and frequently appears on ABC News. She lost her sight at the age of six months and has been a news reporter for ABC since 2011.

== Career ==
Campanella earned a degree in communications at the University of Technology Sydney. After University, she joined the ABC as a cadet journalist in Sydney in 2011. Her first job was as a regional reporter and newsreader in Bega, and then in 2013 she became a newsreader for Triple J. In 2020 she became the ABC's first Disability Affairs Reporter.

Campanella holds the distinction of being the world's first blind newsreader to operate the studio herself while delivering live broadcasts. She is also a motivational speaker to students, educators, parents, and professionals, addressing a wide array of topics, such as inclusive education, and adaptive technology. She also mentors people with disabilities and mental health challenges.

== Disability ==
Campanella lost her sight at the age of six months, when blood vessels in her eyes burst, causing her retinas to detach. She also suffers from Charcot–Marie–Tooth disease, meaning she is unable to read Braille.

Because she cannot read the auto prompt on live TV, she relies on screen reading software called JAWS which scans text on the screen and plays it in her headphones, along with other audio streams such as a timer.

== Personal life ==
Nas was born in 1989, and grew up in Western Sydney in a large Australian-Italian family. After initially struggling with reading because of her disabilities, she did well at school and became dux of her high school. She is married to Thomas Oriti, also an ABC News journalist, and they have a son named Lachie.

== Awards ==
Nas won an Aspire award in 2020 and was a finalist in "Blind Australian of the Year" in 2021.She was also awarded the title "Confident Changemake of the Year" at the 2022 "Australian Network on Disability and Disability Confidence Awards.
