= Automatik =

Automatik may refer to:

- Automatik Text Reader
- "Automatik" (song) by Livvi Franc
- Automatik Entertainment, film production company
- Automatik, textile machinery company 1947–1992, now a division of Rieter
- Automatik, Serbian record label Artistička radna akcija

== See also ==
- Automatic (disambiguation)
