= Gnopernicus =

Assistive technology

- Gnopernicus logo
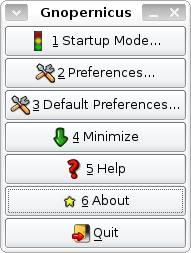
- Gnopernicus
- Initial release: December 7, 2001; 24 years ago
- Final release: 1.1.2 / August 21, 2006; 19 years ago
- Written in: C
- Operating system: Unix-like
- Platform: AT-SPI
- Type: Screen reader Accessibility
- License: GNU Lesser General Public License 2
- Website: wiki.gnome.org/Attic/Gnopernicus

Gnopernicus was a free GNOME desktop application that provided Assistive Technologies (AT) for blind and visually impaired users. Gnopernicus is no longer actively developed and has been replaced by Orca in GNOME.

Gnopernicus is a "one-size-fits-all" screen reader that provided speech, Braille, and magnification for users with a range of visual impairments. Gnopernicus provided for user interface customization - including customizing the speech output and voices, customizing the keystroke commands to drive it, customizing the Braille display key input, and customizing the way magnification is rendered. It was also possible to edit the XML files that describe the speech and Braille output renderings.

Gnopernicus was bundled as the default screen reader on GNOME 2.4 on September 10, 2003; however, the development of Gnopernicus was started in 2001. Orca, with its radical different coding approach of making applications accessible, had more flexibility than the original Gnopernicus design and replaced it as the default screen reader in GNOME 2.16 in September 2006.

== Maintainers list ==
The development of Gnopernicus was led by BAUM Engineering, a partner company of Baum Retec AG.

The maintainers managed the development process with the help of many other members of the GNOME community:

- Draghi Puterity
- Remus Draica
- Dragan Sarbut
- Ada Telescu
- Oana Serb

Other developers who made great contributions to the project were Adriana Iobb, Pal Csongor Sprencz, Iuliu Szijjarto and Adi Dascal
