= Leidig =

Leidig is a surname. Notable people with the surname include:

- Charles J. Leidig (born 1956), American military commander
- Michael Leidig (born 1965), British journalist
- Sabine Leidig (born 1961), German politician
