= Upasana Makati =

Indian entrepreneur

Upasana Makati is a Mumbai-based entrepreneur, founder of White Print, and activist for the visually impaired. In 2016, she was named one of Forbes India's 30 Under 30.

== Education ==
Makati studied communication at the University of Ottawa.

== White Print ==
In 2013, Upasana Makati considered how visually impaired people began their day, so she visited schools to find out. After discovering few options for the visually impaired to read without the assistance of a screen reader, she founded White Print, India's first English lifestyle magazine published in braille. The magazine prints 64 pages and covers topics like art, sports, politics, and film.

The magazine is a for-profit, paid for via traditional methods like subscribers and corporate advertisements.
