= MSAA =

MSAA may refer to:

== Science and technology ==
- Multisample anti-aliasing, a type of anti-aliasing
- Microsoft Active Accessibility, an application programming interface for user interface accessibility
- Multifunctional serotonin agonist and antagonist; see Flibanserin

== Other uses ==
- Maharashtra State Angling Association, the controlling organisation of Powai Lake

== See also ==
- Managed software as a service (MSaaS), in software as a service
