= Automata (disambiguation) =

Automata are self-operating machines.

Automata may also refer to:

== Computing ==
- Cellular automata, a discrete model studied in computability theory and other disciplines
- Von Neumann cellular automata, the original expression of cellular automata
- Automata theory, the study of abstract machines
- Automata UK, a former software house

== Arts and entertainment ==
- "The Automata", an 1819 short story by E. T. A. Hoffmann
- "Automata", a 1929 short story by S. Fowler Wright
- Autómata, a 2014 science-fiction film
- Nier: Automata, a 2017 video game
- Automata, an alternative title of The Devil's Machine, a 2019 British horror film directed by Lawrie Brewster

== See also ==
- Automat (disambiguation)
- Automatic (disambiguation)
- Automaton (disambiguation)
