= SNAPI =

SNAPI is a system that allows a visually impaired user to record their preferences onto a smart card or other security token.

When a card, mobile phone, key fob token or similar portable object containing SNAPI data is put into public or shared IT equipment, or moved into the field of the equipment's sensor, it informs the terminal about the user's preferred user interface. The terminal could be a shared personal computer, a public kiosk, a ticket machine, a turnstile or an automated teller machine (ATM). This can enable various accessibility modes such as a high-contrast display or increased typeface size, audible prompts, or increased time for responses for the duration of the transaction. When the transaction is complete, the terminal returns to its default settings.

The coding is specified in the European standard EN 1332–4. The Local Authority Smartcard Standards e-Organisation (LASSeO) has supported the inclusion of SNAPI coding in various UK local authority smart card schemes.
