= Virtual Magnifying Glass =

Open source screen magnifying tool

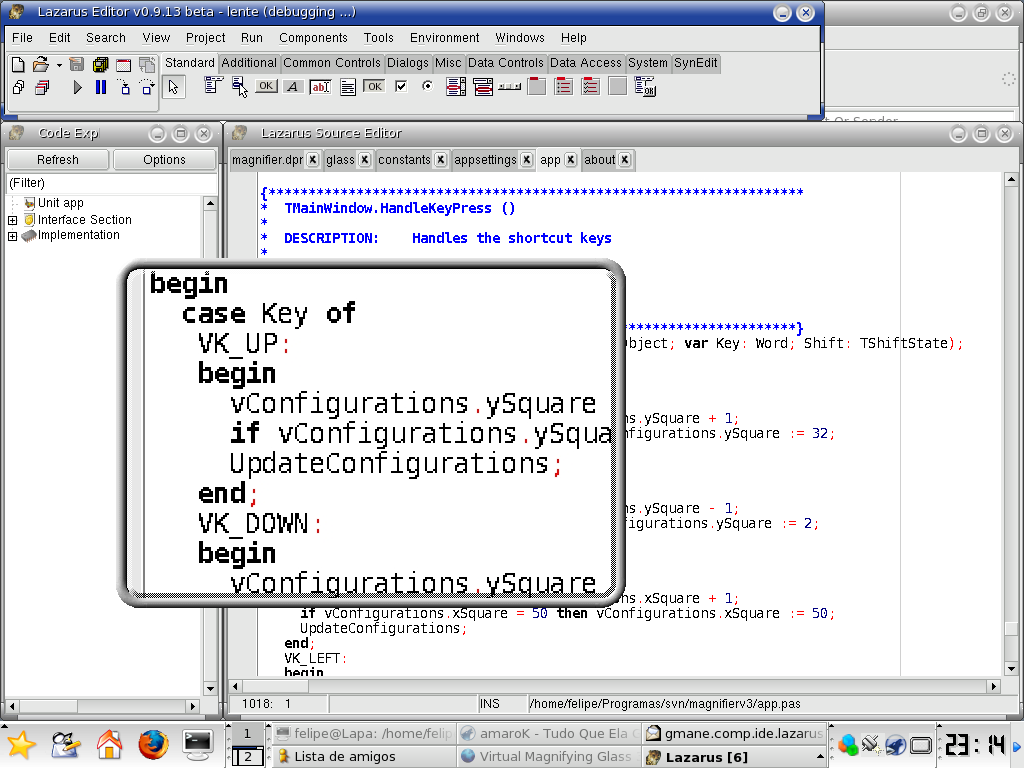
- Magnifier 3.2 enlarging its own source code
- Developer(s): Volunteers
- Stable release: 3.6 / September 2013
- Operating system: Cross-platform
- Type: Accessibility
- License: GPL
- Website: magnifier.sourceforge.net

Virtual Magnifying Glass is an open-source, screen magnification tool for Microsoft Windows and Linux.

Virtual Magnifying Glass is designed for the visually impaired and others who need to magnify part of the computer display. Unlike most similar programs, it does not open a separate program window for the magnification but instead puts a movable magnifying glass on the screen.

Virtual Magnifying Glass works on a variety of platforms (Windows, Linux, FreeBSD, Mac OS) due to being developed with the Free Pascal compiler. There is no charge for the software.

== See also ==
- Screen magnifier
