= Linux Screen Reader =

Discontinued assistive reading software

- Initial release: May 19, 2006
- Final release: 0.5.3 / June 4, 2007
- Written in: Python
- Operating system: Unix-like
- Type: Screen reader Accessibility
- License: New BSD License
- Website: wiki.gnome.org/LSR

The Linux Screen Reader (LSR) is a discontinued free and open source effort to develop an extensible assistive technology for the GNOME desktop environment. The goal of the project was to create a reusable development platform for building alternative and supplemental user interfaces in support of people with diverse disabilities.

The original use of the LSR platform was to give people with visual impairments access to the GNOME desktop and its business applications (e.g. Firefox, OpenOffice, Eclipse) using speech, Braille, and screen magnification. The extensions packaged with the LSR core were intended to meet this end.

LSR was an alternative to Orca, but there were a number of non-competitive reasons for having two extensible assistive technologies for the GNOME desktop.

- Two implementations stress test desktop accessibility in non-overlapping ways:
- Two design philosophies explore different ideas for system architectures and user interfaces.
- Two products enable user choice based on the task at hand, personal preferences, and the individual strengths of the two systems.
- There is ton of room for innovation in the field of enabling technology.

Linux Screen Reader (LSR) was started in 2006 by IBM. Initially, LSR was released with the Common Public License but on November 29, 2006, the version 0.3.2 was switched to the New BSD License. It was discontinued in 2007 when IBM focused their resources in other projects.

== Maintainers list ==
The maintainers managed the development process with the help of many other members of the GNOME community:

- Larry Weiss
- Brett Clippingdale
- Peter Parente

Other developers who made great contributions to the project were Pete Brunet, Eirikur Hallgrimsson, Scott Haeger, Eitan Isaacson, Andy Shi, Critóbal Palmer and Joel Feiner.
