= Automat (disambiguation) =

An automat is a type of restaurant.

Automat may also refer to:

- Automat (Romano Musumarra and Claudio Gizzi album), 1978
- Automat (Metz album), 2019
- Automat (painting), a 1927 painting by Edward Hopper
- Automat Pictures, an entertainment production company based in Los Angeles
- The Automat, a 2021 documentary on Horn & Hardart automats

== See also ==
- Automata (disambiguation)
- Automatic (disambiguation)
- Automaton (disambiguation)
