= Tactile (device) =

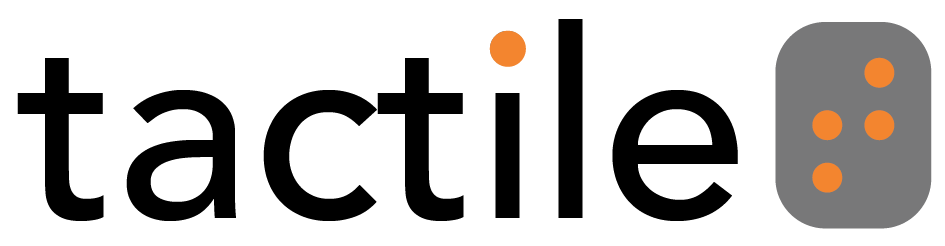

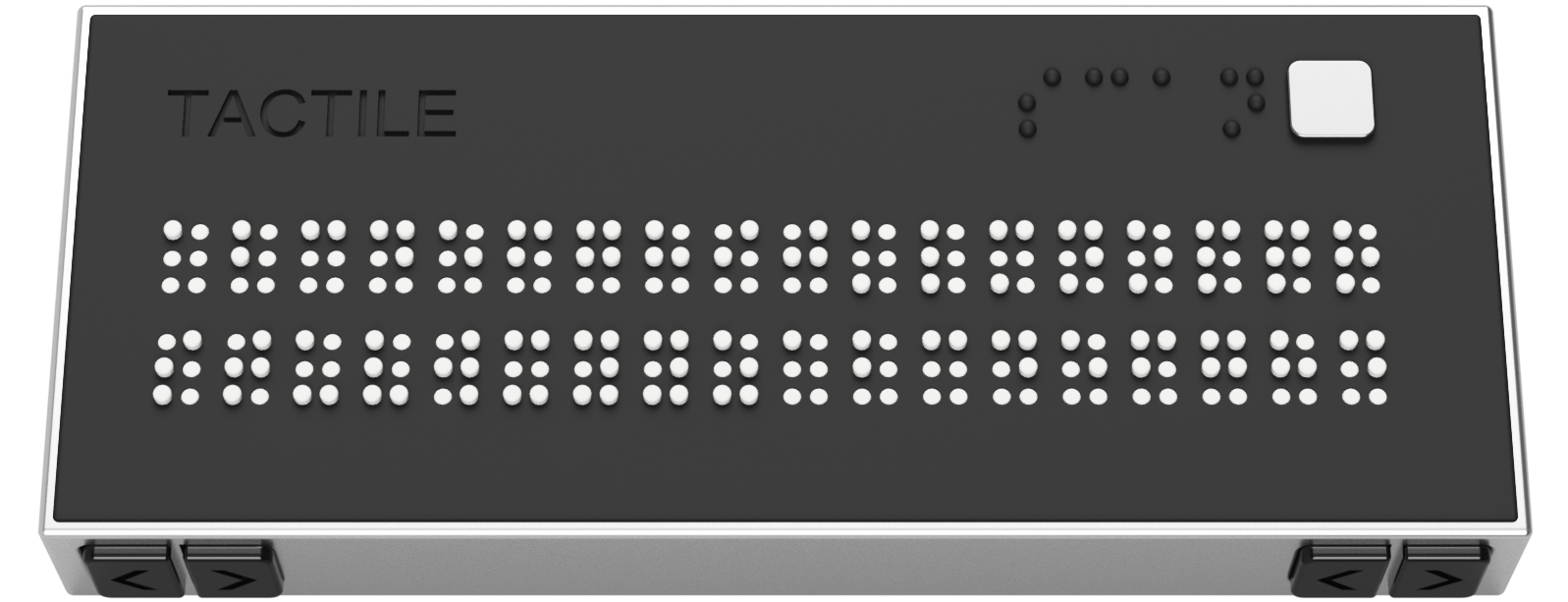
- Rendering of braille-side interface; camera on reverse
- Developer: Tactile Technologies, Inc.
- Type: Refreshable braille display
- Lifespan: In development
- Introductory price: US$100 (intended)
- Display: English Braille
- Input: Integrated camera
- Dimensions: L: 5.0 in (130 mm); W: 2.0 in (51 mm)

Tactile is a real-time text-to-braille translation device currently under development at the Massachusetts Institute of Technology. It was conceived by a team of undergraduate students, competing as "Team 100% Enthusiasm", during a 15-hour MIT "hackathon". The device is slid over printed text and a camera captures images of the words and sends them to a microcontroller. The information moves the pins up and down, translating the text into Braille. Once on the market it is hoped to be much cheaper than existing devices.

== People ==
The six-person development team comprises Chandani Doshi, Grace Li, Jialin Shi, Bonnie Wang, Charlene Xia, and Tania Yu, all undergraduate students at MIT at the time of Tactile's conception. A joint collaboration in materials science, mechanical and electrical engineering, and computer science, Tactile received popular media attention for its rapid pace of development, as well as its inventors all being women in STEM fields with disproportionally low female representation.

== Development ==
Tactile provides real-time translation of English text, captured by integrated camera, into braille dynamically rendered on a refreshable display. The end product is to display 36 braille characters at a time on a 5 in × 2 in (127 mm × 51 mm) interface (Note: Current functioning prototypes are moderately larger; the intended size assumes the ongoing miniaturization of its component systems.) with an intended retail price around US$100. With existing braille display devices priced in the range of $1,500 to $2,500, Tactile has been characterized as a potential "quantum leap forward for the blind community."

The Tactile team was awarded a $10,000 grant in the MIT IDEAS Global Challenge and was accepted into the Microsoft Patent Program, receiving funding and legal counsel from Microsoft to apply for patent protection in the United States. The application was filed on September 16, 2016, and presently has patent pending status.

== See also ==
- Assistive technology
