= Window-Eyes =

App designed for the blind and visually-impaired

- Developers: GW Micro, Inc.
- Initial release: 1995; 30 years ago
- Final release: 9.4 / March 8, 2016; 9 years ago
- Operating system: Microsoft Windows
- Platform: Windows Vista, Windows Server 2008, Windows 7, Windows 8, and Windows 10
- Available in: 14 languages (including English, Spanish, French, German, Italian, and Portuguese)
- Type: Screen reader
- License: Proprietary
- Website: Official website at the Wayback Machine (archived 2023-03-15)

Window-Eyes is screen reader software for the Microsoft Windows operating system, developed by GW Micro. The first version was released in 1995.

== Features ==
Window-Eyes 9.4 is compatible with Windows Vista, Windows Server 2008, Windows 7, Windows 8, and Windows 10. Window-Eyes 7 added support for industry standard scripting, which can be used to modify specific settings in Window-Eyes, monitor portions of the screen for certain kinds of activity, define hotkeys, and automate repetitive tasks.

== History ==
Window-Eyes was developed by GW Micro, a company based in Fort Wayne, Indiana. Window-Eyes was produced in 14 languages, and the English version includes nine text-to-speech languages, including US English, UK English, Castilian Spanish, Mexican Spanish, French, Canadian French, German, Italian, and Portuguese. GW Micro was acquired by or merged with AI Squared in 2014, with the combined company retaining the URLs of gwmicro.com, but sites rebranded as 'AI Squared'. In 2014, a partnership with [Microsoft] resulted in a free license offered to any users of certain versions of Microsoft Office. By July 2017, the product was no longer offered for sale in the United States and Canada, and support for existing purchases was only offered. The company suggests new customers instead use the JAWS screen reader.
