= VoiceOver =

Screen reader developed by Apple

- VoiceOver running on macOS 11
- Developer: Apple Inc.
- Operating system: macOS, iOS, tvOS, and watchOS
- Type: Screen reader
- Website: www.apple.com/accessibility/voiceover/

VoiceOver is a screen reader built into Apple Inc.'s macOS, iOS, tvOS, watchOS, and iPod operating systems. By using VoiceOver, the user can access their Macintosh or iOS device based on spoken descriptions and, in the case of the Mac, the keyboard. The feature is designed to increase accessibility for blind and low-vision users, as well as for users with dyslexia.

The keyboard shortcut to activate VoiceOver is ⌘ Command+F5.

== macOS ==
VoiceOver was first introduced in Mac OS X 10.4 and the target was users who had difficulty in reading due to vision impairment, particularly the blind. A preview had also been made available for Mac OS X 10.3 Panther, and was titled "Spoken Interface Preview."

VoiceOver treats the user interface as a hierarchy of elements, which are navigated by various keystrokes. Elements also are "interacted" with—for example, interacting with a text box allows reading its text and, if possible, editing it; interacting with a scroll bar allows it to be moved using the keyboard.

VoiceOver also includes support for many Braille displays. In addition, VoiceOver includes features for those that cannot use the mouse, such as keyboard-based navigation. For users with MacBooks or Magic Trackpads, a number of special multitouch features are also available. The trackpad will respond to gestures, much like iOS's version of VoiceOver. A specific example is using the trackpad to explore the actual visual layout of elements on the screen—sliding one finger around the trackpad will select elements, tapping twice will activate them.

In Mac OS X 10.5, Apple added the "Alex" voice, which offered improved quality of speech and a more human-like sound. Previously, the voices were directly descended from those used in Apple's "Speech Manager," which originated in the early 1990s. Also, Alex voice has natural breathing, unlike all other voices in Apple.

In Mac OS X 10.7, Apple offered the download of RealSpeak voices from Nuance for use with VoiceOver.

=== Accessibility Inspector ===
Accessibility Inspector is made to verify the accessibility of OS X applications. It displays information about the GUI element that is currently under the cursor.

== iPod Shuffle ==
After its success on Macs, Apple added VoiceOver to the iPod Shuffle. This assists users of the iPod Shuffle in controlling the playback of songs by having the title and artist of the currently playing song read out. With the 2010 revision of iPod Shuffle, the user can also have VoiceOver read out playlists. Unlike VoiceOver on OS X, where VoiceOver is marketed as an accessibility feature, on the iPod Shuffle VoiceOver is intended to be used by everyone, disabled or not.

== iOS ==
A few months later, with the release of the iPhone 3GS, VoiceOver was added to iOS. When the iPod Touch was upgraded to match the hardware of the iPhone 3GS (in iPod touch's third generation), it also gained VoiceOver capability. The iPad, since its introduction, has also had VoiceOver capability.

VoiceOver on iOS interacts with the user by using various "gestures," different motions one makes with one or more fingers on the display. Many gestures are location-sensitive—for example, sliding one's finger around the screen will reveal the visual contents of the screen as the finger passes over them. This enables blind users to explore the actual on-screen layout of an application. A user can double-tap—similar to double-clicking a mouse—to activate a selected element, just as if a sighted user had tapped the item.

VoiceOver can also turn off the display but leave the touch screen sensitive to touch, saving battery power. Apple calls this feature "Screen Curtain". It is also available on Mac computers running OS X.

VoiceOver for iOS is activated using the "Settings" application. It can be found in the Accessibility section. The device can also be configured so that VoiceOver can be toggled by a triple-click of the Home or side button on the device. The user can also ask Siri to enable or disable VoiceOver.

== iPod nano ==
In September 2010, Apple launched this feature on the iPod nano line. It uses many of the same gestures as the iOS version.
