= Automate (disambiguation) =

Automate may refer to:

- Automation
- Automate (album), a 1998 album by Forma Tadre
- Automate (crustacean), a genus of pistol shrimp
- Automate (mythology), a Danaid in Greek mythology

== See also ==
- Automation (disambiguation)
