= CEN =

Cen or CEN may refer to:

== People and language ==
- Cen language
- Cen (rune) (ᚳ), a rune of the Anglo-Saxon fuþorc
- Cen (surname) (岑), a Chinese second name

== Acronym ==
- Certified Emergency Nurse
- Childhood emotional neglect
- Cambridge Evening News, former name for the Cambridge News
- Center for Electron Nanoscopy, an institute at the Technical University of Denmark (DTU)
- Central European News, a news distributor
- European Committee for Standardization (Comité Européen de Normalisation)
- SCK•CEN, Belgian nuclear research institute (Centre d'Étude de l'énergie Nucléaire)
- Chemical and Engineering News, a publication of the American Chemical Society

== Abbreviation or code ==
- Centaurus, the constellation
- Centaur (minor planet)
- Centralia, Illinois (Amtrak station)
- Central Region, Scotland, Chapman code
- Central station (MTR), Hong Kong
- Ciudad Obregón International Airport (IATA code: CEN) in Ciudad Obregón, Sonora, Mexico
