= Automaton (disambiguation) =

An automaton is a self-operating machine.

Automaton may also refer to:

- An automaton, an abstract machine in mathematics, computer science, and automata theory, a mathematical model of computer hardware and software
  - In particular, a finite-state automaton, an automaton limited to a finite state space

== Film and TV ==
- Automatons (film), a 2006 film

== Music ==
- Automaton (album), Jamiroquai 2017
- Automaton (song), a song by Jamiroquai 2017
- "Automaton", a song by DJ Robotaki 2017
- "Automaton", a song by English indie rock band The Rakes
- Otamatone, an electronic musical synthesizer

== Other uses ==
- Automaton Media, a gaming website operated by Active Gaming Media.

== See also ==
- Automat (disambiguation)
- Automata (disambiguation)
- Automation (disambiguation)
