= Bounce keys =

Computer accessibility feature

Bounce keys is a feature in various computer operating systems. It is an accessibility feature to aid users who have physical disabilities. Bounce keys allows the user to configure the computer to ignore rapid, repeated keypresses of the same key.

This is typically intended for users who press keys multiple times because of impaired motor skills and intended to press the key only once.
