= Freedom Scientific =

American accessibility software company

Freedom Scientific is a company that makes accessibility products for computer users with low vision and blindness. The software they create enables screen magnification, screen reading, and use of refreshable braille displays with modern computers. The company is a subsidiary of Vispero and is based in Clearwater, Florida.

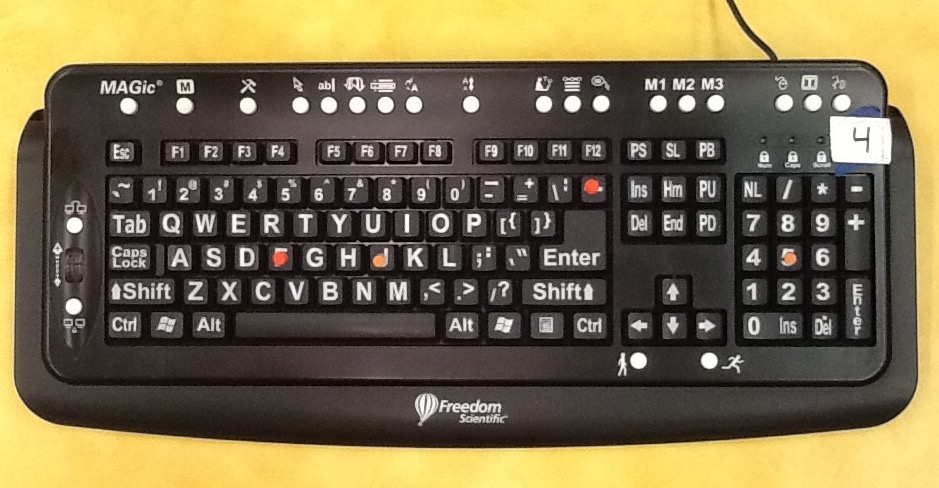
The Freedom Scientific MAGic Large Print Keyboard

== History ==
Former motorcycle racer Ted Henter developed the JAWS screen reader after he became blind as a result of a car accident. Henter and Bill Joyce founded Henter-Joyce in 1987 in St. Petersburg, Florida, producing an MS-DOS version of JAWS and later a Microsoft Windows version. Henter-Joyce merged with Arkenstone and Blazie Engineering in 2000 to form Freedom Scientific.
