= National Association of Press Agencies =

The UK-based National Association of Press Agencies is a loose association of some of the largest private UK news agencies like Splash, Barcroft, SWNS and Caters. The agencies work together to discuss issues of mutual interest and maintain professional standards of conduct. They also organize an annual awards ceremony known as the NAPAs which rewards the best agency generated content usually published in UK national newspapers. NAPA holds one AGM a year that usually takes place in London at the Grange City Hotel.
