= Speech Manager =

The Speech Manager, in the classic Mac OS, is a part of the operating system used to convert text into sound data to play through a sound output device such as a speaker. The Speech Manager's interaction with the Sound Manager is transparent to a software application.

== See also ==
- PlainTalk
