= Accessibility Toolkit =

Software library

ATK
- Stable release: 2.36.0 / April 2, 2020; 6 years ago
- License: GNU LGPL (version 2)
- Website: wiki.gnome.org/Accessibility
- Repository: gitlab.gnome.org/GNOME/atk.git

Simplified software architecture of GTK+. Pango, GDK, ATK, GIO, Cairo and GLib

Accessibility Toolkit (ATK) is an open source software library, part of the GNOME project, which provides application programming interfaces (APIs) for implementing accessibility support in software.

One common nomenclature to explain an accessibility framework is a usual client-server architecture. In that way, assistive technologies (ATs) such as screen readers, would be the clients of that framework, and computer applications would be the server. In this architecture the client and server need to communicate with each other, usually using the IPC technology of the platform. Ideally the accessibility framework expose this to the client and server in a transparent way.

Usually the API for both client-side and server-side applications are the same, and the accessibility framework provides a client-side and a server-side implementation of that API. In the case of GNOME, there are two different APIs, one for the client-side (Assistive Technology Service Provider Interface (AT-SPI)) and a different one for the server-side (ATK) due to historical reasons related to the underlying technologies.

== Implementations ==
The ATK abstract headers files are freely available to help developers who want to make their GUI toolkit accessible. Developers who use stock widgets of GUI toolkits that implements the ATK headers can more easily make their applications accessible. However, if they develop their own widgets, they will have to ensure that they are exposing all the accessible information.

GAIL (GNOME Accessibility Implementation Library) was the name of the accessibility interfaces implementation defined by ATK for GTK+, the widget library of GNOME. Initially, GAIL was an independent module mapped to GTK+ but since GNOME 3.2, GAIL was merged into GTK+, so the ATK implementation is integrated into GTK+ and GAIL is deprecated.

Apart from GTK+, other GUI toolkits and applications have implemented ATK in order to be accessible, such as OpenOffice/LibreOffice, Mozilla's Gecko, Clutter and WebKitGTK+.

== Development ==
ATK is part of the GNOME Accessibility Framework that was released in 2001. The main development force behind ATK was the Accessibility Program Office (APO) of Sun Microsystems, Inc. (now Oracle) with contributions from many community members. When Oracle acquired Sun in 2010 they cut developer jobs of full-time developers working on GNOME accessibility components such as the Accessibility Toolkit ATK and the Orca screen reader. Since then, ATK is mainly maintained by the GNOME community.

== Successor ==
During GUADEC 2020 Emanuelle Bassi announced to have been working for about 6 months on a successor to ATK. Accessibility will no longer be maintained out-of-tree but be part of GTK. Available since GTK 3.99.0 The new approach will implement WAI-ARIA (World Wide Web Consortium (W3C) Accessibility Initiative – Accessible Rich Internet Applications).

== Maintainers ==
ATK development has been led by their maintainers with the help of its community. The maintainers so far are:

Current:

- Alejandro Piñeiro Iglesias

Previous:

- Bill Haneman
- Leon Fan
- Li Yuan
