= Sound Manager =

The Sound Manager is a part of the classic Apple Macintosh operating system, in Classic Mac OS. It is used to control the production and manipulation of sounds on Macintosh computers. The Sound Manager is also used by other parts of the Macintosh system software that produce sounds, such as the Speech Manager and QuickTime.

It was replaced by Core Audio in Mac OS X.
