= Michael Leidig =

British journalist (born 1965)

Michael Leidig (born April 1965) is a British journalist and author based in Austria.

He founded the Vienna-based news agency Central European News (CEN) in 1995, established the Fourth Estate Alliance in 2018, and later founded newsX, a community interest company created to support independent journalism.

== Career ==
Leidig has worked as a reporter in newspapers, magazines, radio and television since 1988. He moved to Austria in 1993, where he presented the Austrian Broadcasting Corporation's English News service, and from 1995 worked as a Vienna correspondent for the Daily Telegraph and Sunday Telegraph.

In 1995, Leidig founded CEN in Vienna. He also founded and edited the English-language Austrian publications The Vienna Reporter, Austria Today and Austrian Times. He also contributed to Die Presse and Wiener Zeitung.

Leidig co-authored Girl in the Cellar: The Natascha Kampusch Story with journalist Allan Hall. He also co-authored the Dorling Kindersley travel guide Top 10 Vienna with Irene Zoech. In 2013, he published Pyramid Games, about European connections to the Bernie Madoff investment scandal. Press Gazette subsequently reported that Austrian prosecutors opened an investigation into a banker following claims made in the book.

In 2008, Leidig and Austrian charity worker Hannes Urban founded the Austrian charity project Journalism Without Borders. The project was intended to help people featured in published news reports and kept its editorial activities separate from the administration of charitable payments.

In 2009, Leidig won the National Association of Press Agencies' exclusive photograph of the year award for a photograph of Josef Fritzl in prison, first published by The Sun.

As vice-chairman of the National Association of Press Agencies, Leidig spoke on behalf of independent agencies in disputes over payment, attribution and copyright for reused material. In 2013, ten NAPA agencies reached an out-of-court settlement of more than €50,000 with a Croatian website over the unauthorised use of their photographs.

In December 2018, Leidig launched the Fourth Estate Alliance, a non-profit initiative intended to support freelance journalists. It aimed to create online newsrooms in which journalists could collaborate on stories, with payments divided among the team members who produced the material.

In April 2024, CEN and Leidig's associated agencies Newsflash, AsiaWire and Clipzilla ceased publication after revenues fell below operating costs. At the time, the network employed around 30 people, with offices in Austria and Macedonia and staff also working in China, Egypt, Turkey and Iran.

Later in 2024, NationalWorld reported that newsX was operating as a media community interest company with the purpose of promoting independent reporting. It had an exclusive distribution arrangement with six news agencies and a daily feed of up to 50 news items worldwide.

Leidig has also campaigned on the economics and sustainability of journalism. In written evidence published by the House of Commons Culture, Media and Sport Committee in 2017, he proposed using cloud-based virtual newsrooms to reduce costs in journalism. He later advanced related arguments through newsX's “Proof of Work” campaign, which he has described as intended to ensure fair payment for editorial labour. In 2026, newsX submitted evidence to the Competition and Markets Authority's inquiry into the proposed Getty Images–Shutterstock merger, raising concerns about remuneration for verification work and the position of independent editorial agencies. The CMA's final report cited the newsX response among submissions from UK editorial agencies and photographers raising concerns about barriers faced by smaller market participants.

== Legal disputes ==
Following publication of Girl in the Cellar, a public-relations adviser to the Kampusch family alleged that Leidig had fabricated interviews contained in the book. An Austrian court ruled in Leidig's favour in early 2009 and ordered retractions, costs and damages. For legal reasons, Leidig was not permitted to make the result public until 2010.

In April 2015, BuzzFeed News published an investigation alleging that an “alarming proportion” of CEN's unusual-news stories involved exaggeration, embellishment or fabrication. CEN later published a 126-page response denying the claims. Leidig and CEN subsequently filed an $11 million defamation action in the United States in January 2016. In depositions filed during the case, BuzzFeed journalists Alan White and Craig Silverman rejected the suggestion that the article's passage about Leidig “weaving” stories around online material accused him personally of making up or fabricating stories. The action was dismissed on summary judgment in March 2019, with the court holding that the record did not contain evidence from which a reasonable jury could find the challenged statements or their reasonable implications false. Leidig and CEN appealed. In December 2019, the United States Court of Appeals for the Second Circuit upheld the judgment, stating that because the falsity issue was dispositive it did not need to determine whether Leidig and CEN were public figures for purposes of the suit. The Supreme Court of the United States declined to hear the case in October 2020.

== Selected works ==
- Girl in the Cellar: The Natascha Kampusch Story, with Allan Hall
- Top 10 Vienna, with Irene Zoech
- Pyramid Games
