= Automatic (automobile company) =

Defunct American motor vehicle manufacturer

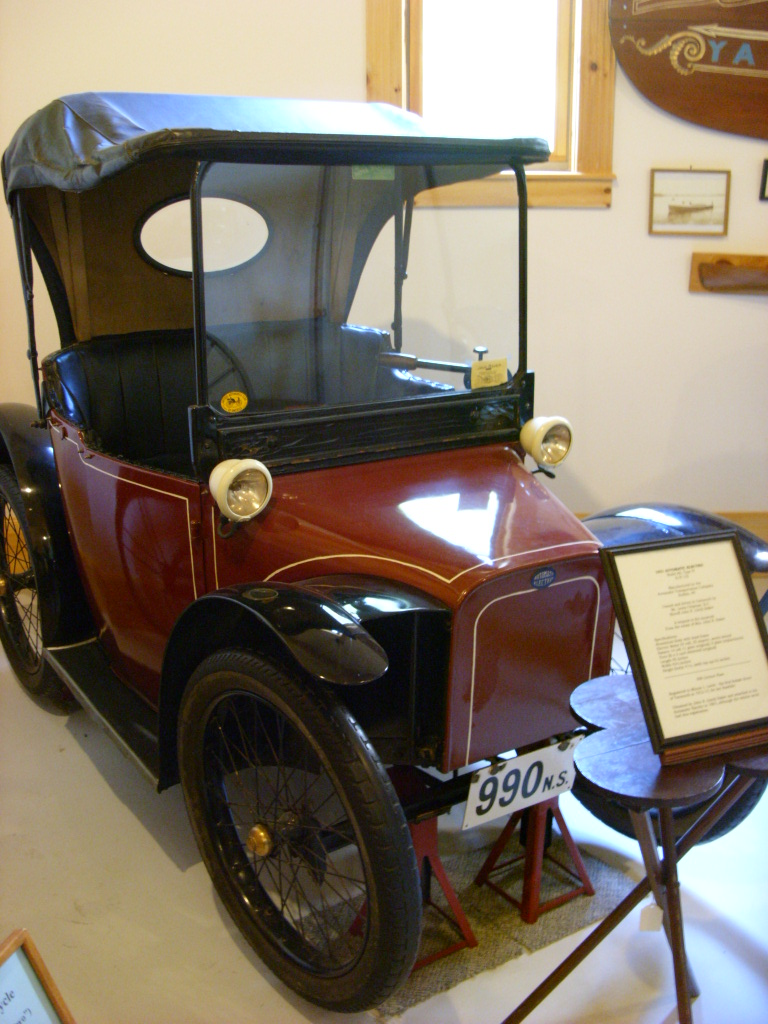
1921 Automatic Electric Pleasure Vehicle, Model AE, at the Yarmouth County Museum in Nova Scotia

The Automatic Transportation Company of Buffalo, New York was a company that built an electric car in 1921. The car was a 2-seater with a wheelbase of 65" (1650 mm), and a total length of 95" (2411 mm). The Automatic had a top speed of 18 mph (29 kmh), and sold for $1200.

Automatic promised that 60 miles travel could be achieved between charging, and that the car could be parked in a 4' x 8' space. Few of the cars were sold.
