= Automation (disambiguation) =

Automation is the process of self-reliability.

Automation may also refer to:

== Computing ==
- Build automation, the use of managed make tools
- Business process automation, streamlining business operations with software
- Document automation, the use of software to streamline document creation
- Electronic design automation, software filling in details of circuit design
- Office automation, software assisting employees in performing job duties
- OLE Automation, the mechanism whereby applications can access and manipulate shared automation objects that are exported by other applications.
- Robotic process automation, automating tasks in back-end and front-end systems directly in the GUI
- Support automation, automating problem prevention and resolution processes solutions
- Test automation, simulation of user actions to automate software testing

== Others ==
- Automation (video game), a 2015 game for Windows
- The Automation, a 2014 novel by an anonymous author using the pen names B.L.A. and G.B. Gabbler
- Broadcast automation, scheduling of broadcasts carried out automatically
- Building automation, regulating environmental parameters for human-occupied buildings
- Console automation, using motorized faders of an audio workstation to automate signal changes
- Home automation, regulating environmental parameters for private occupances
- Laboratory automation, automation of laboratory tasks
- "Automation", a song by the Smashing Pumpkins from Atum: A Rock Opera in Three Acts, 2023

== See also ==
- Automaton (disambiguation)
- Automate (disambiguation)
