= William Joyce (disambiguation) =

William Joyce (1906–1946) was a Second World War propagandist, nicknamed "Lord Haw-Haw".

William Joyce may also refer to:

- Bill Joyce (baseball) (1865–1941), American professional baseball player
- Bill Joyce (1877–?), Scottish association footballer
- Bill Joyece, quarterback for the Detroit Heralds in 1920
- W. Seavey Joyce (1913–1988), American Catholic priest
- Willie Joyce, American boxer and the 1936 National AAU Bantamweight champion
- William Joyce (actor) (1930–1998), American actor
- Billy Joyce (Gaelic footballer) (1950–2025), Irish former Gaelic footballer
- Billy Joyce (wrestler) (1916–2000), English professional wrestler
- William Joyce (writer) (born 1959), American author, illustrator and filmmaker
