= Lipolysis-stimulated lipoprotein receptor =

Protein-coded gene found in humans

LSR

Identifiers
- Aliases: LSR, ILDR3, LISCH7, lipolysis stimulated lipoprotein receptor
- External IDs: OMIM: 616582; MGI: 1927471; GeneCards: LSR

Gene location (Human)
Chr.	Chromosome 19 (human)
Band	19q13.12	Start	35,248,330 bp
Band	19q13.12	End	35,267,964 bp

Gene location (Mouse)
Chr.	Chromosome 7 (mouse)
Band	7|7 B1	Start	30,657,195 bp
Band	7|7 B1	End	30,672,889 bp
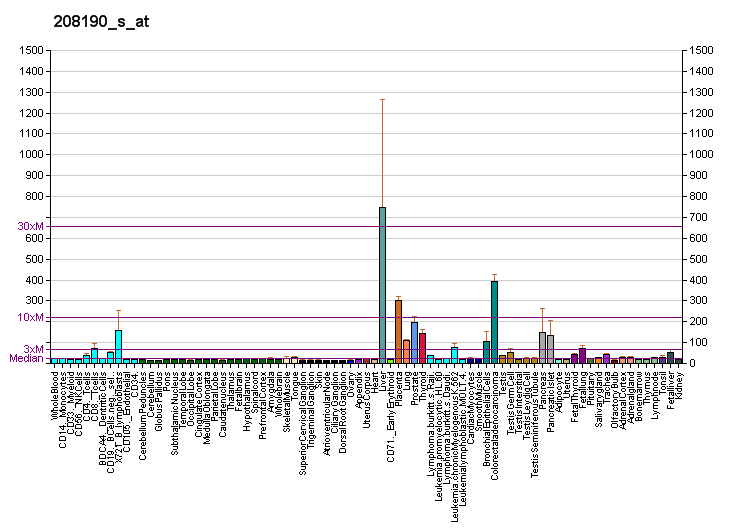
RNA expression pattern
Bgee	Human / Mouse (ortholog); Top expressed in: mucosa of transverse colon; right lobe of liver; body of pancreas; olfactory zone of nasal mucosa; minor salivary glands; gallbladder; right uterine tube; mucosa of sigmoid colon; skin of abdomen; rectum / Top expressed in: gastric mucosa; mucous cell of stomach; epithelium of stomach; crypt of lieberkuhn of small intestine; pyloric antrum; left lobe of liver; yolk sac; jejunum; duodenum; epiblast; More reference expression data
BioGPS	More reference expression data
Gene ontology
Molecular function	protein binding
Cellular component	chylomicron; integral component of membrane; extracellular exosome; membrane; low-density lipoprotein particle; very-low-density lipoprotein particle; tricellular tight junction; plasma membrane
Biological process	regulation of lipid metabolic process; liver development; establishment of blood-brain barrier; tricellular tight junction assembly; protein localization to tricellular tight junction
Sources:Amigo / QuickGO
Orthologs
Databases	NCBI: entry; OMA: entry
Species	Human	Mouse
Entrez	51599	54135
Ensembl	ENSG00000105699	ENSMUSG00000001247
UniProt	Q86X29	Q99KG5
RefSeq (mRNA)	NM_001260489; NM_001260490; NM_015925; NM_205834; NM_205835 NM_001385215	NM_001164184; NM_001164185; NM_017405
RefSeq (protein)	NP_001247418; NP_001247419; NP_057009; NP_991403; NP_991404	NP_001157656; NP_001157657; NP_059101
Location (UCSC)	Chr 19: 35.25 – 35.27 Mb	Chr 7: 30.66 – 30.67 Mb
PubMed search
- Wikidata
View/Edit Human	View/Edit Mouse

Lipolysis-stimulated lipoprotein receptor is a protein that in humans is encoded by the LSR gene.
