= Automatik Text Reader =

Text-to-speech add-on for Firefox

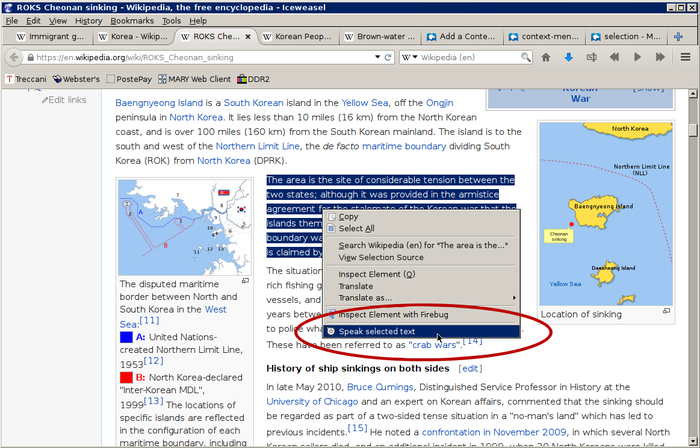
- Automatik Text Reader on Firefox
- Developer(s): Davide Baldini
- Initial release: 20 October 2014; 10 years ago
- Final release: 2.3 / 14 March 2015; 10 years ago
- Written in: JavaScript
- Operating system: Windows, Linux, macOS
- Available in: 6 languages
- List of languages English, Spanish, French, German, Italian and Russian
- Type: Text To Speech
- License: GPLv2

Automatik Text Reader was a free and open source add-on for Firefox providing text-to-speech functions available from the Mozilla Add-ons collection. It supports multiple languages and accents and is capable of autonomously recognizing the language of written text and activating the respective speech synthesis engine. Amongst the peculiar features, the voice speed is adjustable and the text selection is automatic. In addition to the unique features users will find that the interface is very simple to use; having only 4 buttons to operate it.

== Supported languages ==
Automatik Text Reader has support for English, Spanish, French, German, Italian and Russian. The quality of the synthesis varies significantly between the languages, with English being the smoothest, most natural-sounding voice.

== Limitations ==
Being a Firefox add-on, Automatik Text Reader requires Firefox to run and cannot be installed standalone. Also, for very short texts composed of three words or less, the language detector may fail to recognize the correct language.
