= Orca (assistive technology) =

Accessibility software

- Release: September 3, 2006; 20 years ago
- Stable release: 48.1 / 1 May 2025; 17 months ago
- Preview release: n/a (n/a) [±]
- Written in: Python
- Operating system: Unix-like
- Type: Screen reader Accessibility
- License: GNU LGPL (version 2.1)
- Website: orca.gnome.org
- Repository: gitlab.gnome.org/GNOME/orca.git

Orca is a free and open-source, flexible, extensible screen reader from the GNOME project for individuals who are blind or visually impaired. Using various combinations of speech synthesis and braille, Orca helps provide access to applications and toolkits that support AT-SPI (e.g., the GNOME desktop, Mozilla Firefox/Thunderbird, OpenOffice.org/LibreOffice and GTK, Qt and Java Swing/SWT applications).

The name "Orca", which is another term for a killer whale, is a nod to the long-standing tradition of naming screen readers after aquatic creatures, including the Assistive Technology product on Windows called JAWS (which stands for Job Access With Speech), the early DOS screen reader called Flipper, and the UK vision impairment company Dolphin Computer Access.

As of GNOME 2.16, Orca is the default screen reader of the GNOME platform, replacing Gnopernicus. As a result, Orca follows the GNOME stable release cycles of approximately six-months. Orca is provided by default on a number of operating system distributions, including Solaris, Fedora, openSUSE and Ubuntu.

== History ==
The development of Orca was started by the Accessibility Program Office (APO) of Sun Microsystems, Inc. (now Oracle) with contributions from many community members. The original idea and the first working prototype for Orca was started in May 2004 by Marc Mulcahy, a blind programmer who worked for Sun Microsystems. When Mulcahy left Sun Microsystems and ventured out to start his own company, the Accessibility Program Office took his work, continued with it and released the first official version on September 3, 2006. When Oracle acquired Sun Microsystems in 2010 they cut developer jobs of full-time developers working on GNOME accessibility components, including Orca main maintainer Willie Walker. Since then, Orca is run by volunteers, led by Joanmarie Diggs. On September 7, 2011, Igalia, a company specialized in Free Software, hired Joanmarie Diggs and is supporting her work in Orca.

== Features ==
By default, Orca uses speech-dispatcher for its TTS support. In basic configuration, it does not sound natural. In addition, there is basic support for Spiel which allows choosing voices from multiple synthesizers, currently including eSpeak and Piper, which is quality TTS.

Orca's profiles allow users to save and load multiple configurations and the users can quickly access to different profiles, making it far easier to access multilingual text and environments.

== Maintainer list ==
Orca development has been led by their maintainers with the help of its community. The maintainers so far are:

Current:

- Joanmarie Diggs

Previous:

- Alejandro Leiva
- Willie Walker
- Mike Pedersen
- Eitan Isaacson
- Mesar Hameed

Other developers who made great contributions to the project are Krishnakant Mane, Marc Mulcahy, Rich Burridge and Scott Haeger.

== See also ==
- Festival Speech Synthesis System
- Speech-generating device
