= WebAnywhere =

- Developer(s): University of Washington / University of Rochester
- Initial release: 2008; 17 years ago
- Stable release: 0.02 / September 2008; 16 years ago
- Written in: JavaScript, PHP
- Operating system: Cross-platform
- Available in: English
- Type: Screen reader, Accessibility
- License: Open source
- Website: webinsight.cs.washington.edu/wa/

WebAnywhere is a free web-based open source screen reader, created at the University of Washington.

== Features ==
Since WebAnywhere is web-based, it is available on all operating systems. Users simply go to the WebAnywhere site and the screen reader begins working.

== History ==
WebAnywhere was originally created at the University of Washington. It is currently being developed at the University of Rochester's ROCHCI Lab.

== Release history ==
Version	Release date
WebAnywhere 0.02	September 2008
