= Assistive Technology Service Provider Interface =

Computer accessibility framework

AT-SPI
- Stable release: 2.56.4 / 2 August 2025; 4 months ago
- Repository: gitlab.gnome.org/GNOME/at-spi2-core.git
- License: GNU LGPL (version 2)
- Website: wiki.gnome.org/Accessibility

Assistive Technology Service Provider Interface (AT-SPI) is a platform-neutral framework for providing bi-directional communication between assistive technologies (AT) and applications. It is the de facto standard for providing accessibility to free and open desktops, like Linux or OpenBSD, led by the GNOME Project.

One common nomenclature to explain an accessibility framework is a usual client-server architecture. In that way, Assistive Technologies (ATs), such as screen readers, would be the clients of that framework, and computer applications would be the server. In this architecture, client and server need to communicate with each other, usually using the IPC technology of the platform. Ideally the accessibility framework exposes this to the client and server in a transparent way.

Usually the API for both client-side and server-side applications are the same, and the accessibility framework provides a client-side and a server-side implementation of that API. In the case of GNOME, there are two different APIs, one for the client-side (AT-SPI) and a different one for the server-side (Accessibility Toolkit (ATK)) due to historical reasons related to the underlying technologies.

== Implementations ==
AT-SPI was originally designed for using Common Object Request Broker Architecture, an object-based IPC/RPC technology, for its transport protocol. The AT-SPI specification itself was tied to CORBA as it was defined in CORBA IDL. AT-SPI used the GNOME project's own fast and lightweight CORBA implementation, ORBit, and its own framework for creating CORBA components, Bonobo.

The GNOME project decided that the 3.0 release would be free of ORBit and Bonobo, meaning that a D-Bus AT-SPI solution was required. In an effort to move AT-SPI forward, a D-Bus project was started in November 2006. This took the form of a performance and design review available on the GNOME wiki. Work began on the implementation in May 2007. The D-Bus version of AT-SPI, AT-SPI version 2, was released along with GNOME 3.0 in April 2011.

== Support ==
AT-SPI provides an ATK bridge, so all the widget systems or applications that implement ATK will automatically communicate all their events to AT-SPI. The GNOME widget system, GTK+, or Mozilla applications like Firefox and Thunderbird for Linux implement ATK, so they communicate out-of-box with AT-SPI. However, it is completely possible to use AT-SPI without implementing ATK. The D-Bus migration made possible that Qt added AT-SPI support. Qt implemented its own bridge to AT-SPI that was released in alpha status in August 2011 for testing purposes and it was integrated into Qt for general use a year later.

== Development ==
AT/SPI is part of the GNOME Accessibility Framework that was released in 2001. The main development force behind ATK was the Accessibility Program Office (APO) of Sun Microsystems, Inc. (now Oracle) with contributions from many community members. When Oracle acquired Sun in 2010 they cut developer jobs of full-time developers working on GNOME accessibility components like the Accessibility Toolkit ATK and the Orca screen reader. Since then, it is mainly maintained by the GNOME community.

== Maintainers ==
ATK development has been led by their maintainers with the help of its community. The maintainers so far are:

Current:

- Mike Gorse

Previous:

- Mark Doffman
- Li Yuan

== Other uses ==
AT-SPI can also be used for automated testing of user interfaces, with tools such as Linux Desktop Testing Project and Dogtail.

== Licensing ==
AT-SPI is released under the GNU Library General Public License (LGPL) version 2.

== See also ==
- Accessibility Toolkit (ATK)
- Microsoft Active Accessibility (MSAA)
- Microsoft UI Automation (UIA)
- IAccessible2

== See also ==
- GNOME § Accessibility
