= Refreshable braille display =

Device for displaying braille characters

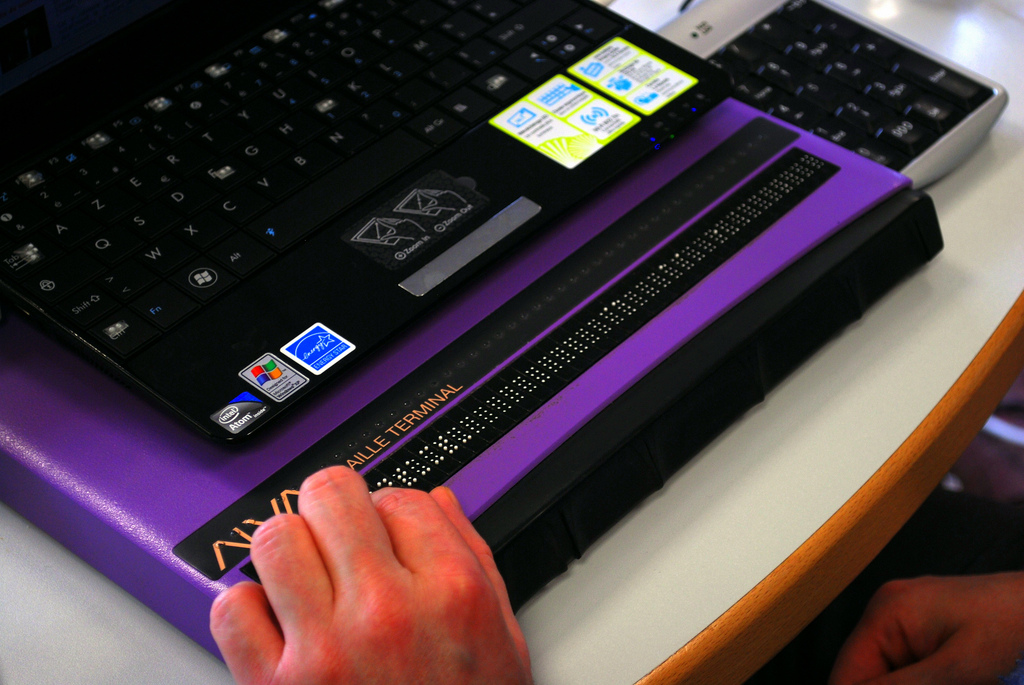
Refreshable braille display

A refreshable braille display or braille terminal is an electro-mechanical device for displaying braille characters, usually by means of round-tipped pins raised through holes in a flat surface. Visually impaired computer users who cannot use a standard computer monitor can use it to read text output. Deafblind computer users may also use refreshable braille displays.

Speech synthesizers are also commonly used for the same task, and a blind user may switch between the two systems or use both at the same time depending on circumstances.

== Mechanical details ==
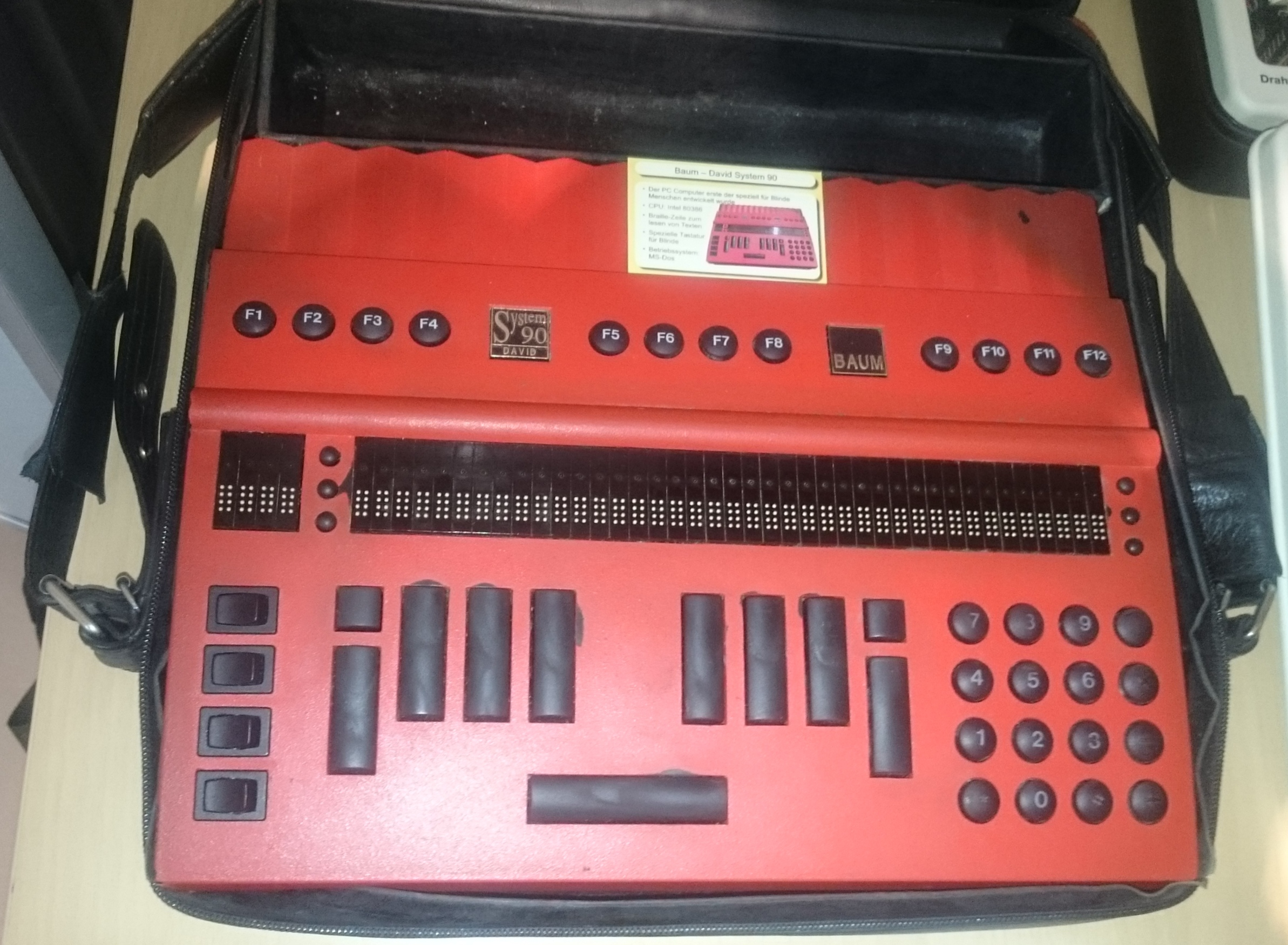
A Baum David System 90 special-purpose computer for the blind, with a braille "screen" and special keyboard

The base of a refreshable braille display often integrates a pure braille keyboard. Similar to the Perkins Brailler, the input is performed by two sets of four keys on each side, while output is via a refreshable braille display consisting of a row of electro-mechanical character cells, each of which can raise or lower a combination of eight round-tipped pins. Other variants exist that use a conventional QWERTY keyboard for input and braille pins for output, as well as input-only and output-only devices.

The mechanism which raises the dots uses the piezo effect of some crystals, whereby they expand when a voltage is applied to them. Such a crystal is connected to a lever, which in turn raises the dot. There has to be a crystal for each dot of the display (i.e., eight per character).

Because of the complexity of producing a reliable display that will cope with daily wear and tear, these displays are expensive. Usually, only 40 or 80 braille cells are displayed. Models with between 18 and 40 cells exist in some notetaker devices.

On some models the position of the cursor is represented by vibrating the dots, and some models have a switch associated with each cell to move the cursor to that cell directly.

== Software ==
The software gathers the content of the screen from the operating system, converts it into braille characters and sends it to the display.

Screen readers for graphical operating systems are especially complex, because graphical elements like windows or slidebars have to be interpreted and described in text form. Modern operating systems usually have an API to help screen readers obtain this information, such as UI Automation (UIA) for Microsoft Windows, VoiceOver for macOS and iOS, and AT-SPI for GNOME.

== Rotation-wheel Braille display ==
A rotating-wheel Braille display was developed in 2000 by the National Institute of Standards and Technology (NIST) and another at the Leuven University in Belgium. In these units, braille dots are put on the edge of a spinning wheel, which allows the user to read continuously with a stationary finger while the wheel spins at a selected speed. The braille dots are set in a simple scanning-style fashion as the dots on the wheel spin past a stationary actuator that sets the braille characters. As a result, manufacturing complexity is greatly reduced and rotating-wheel braille displays, when in actual production, should be less expensive than traditional braille displays.

== See also ==
- GNOME accessibility
- VoiceOver
- Tactile project at MIT
