= Java Access Bridge =

Component of the Java computing software platform

The Java Access Bridge (JAB) exposes accessibility information about Java components to screen readers and other assistive technologies running on the Windows platform.

Prior to Java SE Version 7 Update 6, the Java Access Bridge needed to be installed separately, but is now distributed with the Java Runtime Environment.
