= JAWS (screen reader) =

Computer screen reader software

JAWS for Windows
- Developer: Freedom Scientific
- Release: January 1989; 37 years ago
- Stable release: 2027.2610.428 / November 3, 2026; 12 days ago
- Operating system: Microsoft Windows
- Type: Screen reader
- License: Proprietary
- Website: Official website

Job Access With Speech (JAWS) is a computer screen reader program for Microsoft Windows that allows blind and visually impaired users to read the screen either with a text-to-speech output or by a refreshable Braille display. JAWS is produced by the Blind and Low Vision Group of Freedom Scientific.

A 2026 screen reader user survey by WebAIM, a web accessibility company, found JAWS to be the most popular desktop/laptop screen reader worldwide both for primary usage and as a commonly used screen reader (55.0% and 69.2%, respectively), ranking it in front of the free open-source screen reader NVDA.

JAWS supports Windows 10 and Windows 11 along with all versions of Windows Server released since Windows Server 2016. There are two versions of the program: the Home edition for non-commercial use and the Professional edition for commercial environments. Before JAWS 16, the Home edition was called Standard, and only worked on the home editions of Windows operating systems. A DOS version is free.

The JAWS Scripting Language allows the user to use programs without standard Windows controls, and programs that were not designed for accessibility.

== History ==
JAWS was originally released in 1989 by Ted Henter, a former motorcycle racer who lost his sight in a 1978 automobile accident. In 1985, Henter, along with a US$180,000 investment from Bill Joyce, founded the Henter-Joyce Corporation in St. Petersburg, Florida. Joyce sold his interest in the company back to Henter in 1990. In April 2000, Henter-Joyce, Blazie Engineering, and Arkenstone, Inc. merged to form Freedom Scientific.

JAWS was originally created for the MS-DOS operating system. It was one of several screen readers giving blind users access to text-mode MS-DOS applications. A feature unique to JAWS at the time was its use of cascading menus, in the style of the popular Lotus 1-2-3 application. What set JAWS apart from other screen readers of the era was its use of macros that allowed users to customize the user interface and work better with various applications.

Ted Henter and Rex Skipper wrote the original JAWS code in the mid-1980s, releasing version 2.0 in mid-1990. Skipper left the company after the release of version 2.0, and following his departure, Charles Oppermann was hired to maintain and improve the product. Oppermann and Henter regularly added minor and major features and frequently released new versions. Freedom Scientific now offers JAWS for MS-DOS as a freeware download from their website.

In 1993, Henter-Joyce released a highly modified version of JAWS for people with learning disabilities. This product, called WordScholar, is no longer available.

=== JAWS for Windows ===
In 1992, as Microsoft Windows became more popular, Oppermann began work on a new version of JAWS. A principal design goal was not to interfere with the natural user interface of Windows and to continue to provide a strong macro facility. Test and beta versions of JAWS for Windows (JFW) were shown at conferences throughout 1993 and 1994. During this time, developer Glen Gordon started working on the code, ultimately taking over its development when Oppermann was hired by Microsoft in November 1994. Shortly afterwards, in January 1995, JAWS for Windows 1.0 was released.

A new revision of JAWS for Windows is released about once a year, with minor updates in between.

== Features ==
JAWS allows all major functions of the Microsoft Windows operating system to be controlled with keyboard shortcuts and spoken feedback. These shortcuts are kept as consistent as possible throughout most programs, but the very high number of functions needed to fluidly use modern computer software effectively requires the end user to memorize many specific keystrokes. Virtually every aspect of JAWS can be customized by the user, including all keystrokes and factors such as reading speed, granularity used when reading punctuation, and hints. JAWS also includes a scripting language to automate tasks and make more complex modifications to the program's behavior.

The software includes a distinct mode designed specifically for web browsers, activated when a browser is in the foreground. When browsing web pages, JAWS first declares the title and number of links. Speech can be stopped with the control key, lines are navigated with the ↑/↓ arrow keys, and the tab key moves between links and controls. Specific letter keys on the keyboard can be pressed to navigate to the next or previous element of a specific type, such as text boxes or checkboxes. JAWS can access headings in Word and PDF documents in a similar fashion.

The JAWS feature set and its configurability have been described as "complex", with training recommended for users such as web designers performing accessibility testing, to avoid drawing the wrong conclusions from such testing.

=== Scripting Language ===
JAWS Scripting Language (JSL) is a proprietary programming language that allows the interoperation of JAWS. It is a compiled language, allowing for source code protection. "JAWS scripting" commonly refers to customization of the built-in, user-editable utilities of JAWS and editing of its configuration files, as well as the writing of original scripts. JSL acts as an API (application programming interface) and allows users to combine JAWS scripting, Microsoft Active Accessibility scripting, and document object model scripting.
