= Screen magnifier =

Software that enlarges image on part of a computer screen

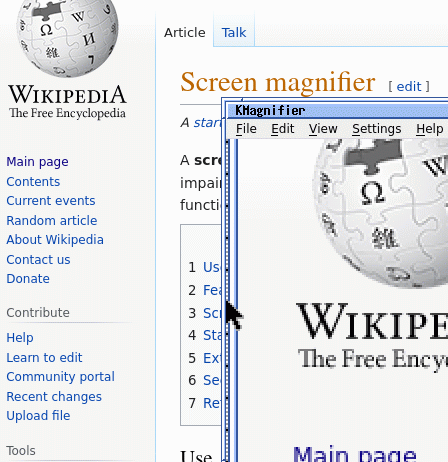
Rendering this very page with Firefox, and magnifying its upper left corner with kmag

A screen magnifier is software that interfaces with a computer's graphical output to present enlarged screen content. By enlarging part (or all) of a screen, people with visual impairments can better see words and images. This type of assistive technology is useful for people with some functional vision; people with visual impairments and little or no functional vision usually use a screen reader.

== Use ==
The simplest form of magnification presents an enlarged portion of the original screen content, the 'focus', so that it covers some or all of the full screen. This enlarged portion should include the content of interest to the user and the pointer or cursor, also suitably enlarged. As the user moves the pointer or cursor the screen magnifier should track with it and show the new enlarged portion. If this tracking is jerky or flickers it is likely to disturb the user. Also, the pointer or cursor may not be the content of interest: for example, if the user presses a keyboard shortcuts that opens a menu, the magnified portion should jump to that menu. Pop-up windows and changes in system status can also trigger this rapid shifting.

Screen magnifiers can be especially helpful for people with low vision, including elderly users. However, in a 2001 paper, Vicki Hanson noted that people with low vision often also have additional disabilities such as tremors.

== Features ==
Ranges of 1- to 16-times magnification are common. The greater the magnification the smaller the proportion of the original screen content that can be viewed, so users will tend to use the lowest magnification they can manage.

Screen magnifiers commonly provide several other features for people with particular sight difficulties:

- Color inversion. Many people with visual impairments prefer to invert the colors, typically turning text from black-on-white to white-on-black. This can reduce screen glare and is useful for elderly people with age-related macular degeneration.
- Smoothing. Text can become blocky and harder to recognise when enlarged. Some screen magnifiers use interpolation to smooth the text to compensate.
- Cursor customisation. The mouse and text cursors can often be modified in several ways, such as circling it to help the user locate it on the screen.
- Different magnification modes. Screen magnifiers can alter how they present the enlarged portion: covering the full screen, providing a lens that is moved around the un-magnified screen, or using a fixed magnified portion.
- Crosshairs. Even with magnification, some users can find the mouse pointer hard to see. Crosshairs – especially when their size, color and opacity are customizable – can make the use of a pointing device easier.
- Screen reader. Some magnifiers come packaged with a basic screen reader, allowing whatever the user is pointing at to be read out.

== Screen magnifiers bundled with an operating system ==
- Haiku includes an application called Magnify
- Linux-based operating systems:
  - Compiz-Fusion window manager has a highly configurable plugin named "Enhanced Zoom Desktop"
  - GNOME has gnome-mag, which as of 2015 forms part of GNOME Shell
  - KDE has KMagnifier (KMag)
- The Microsoft Windows operating system has included the "Magnifier" application since Windows 98 (released in 1998). It can integrate with a mouse-button toggle.
- In OS X, the built-in screen magnification feature can be used at any time by using keyboard shortcuts or by scrolling with a mouse or trackpad. Screen magnification is built into iOS devices as well.

== Stand-alone screen magnifier products ==
- Virtual Magnifying Glass - Cross-platform, open-source magnifier application
- MAGic

== See also ==
- Fresnel lens
- Magnifying glass
