= Assistive technology =

Assistive devices for people with disabilities

Assistive technology (AT) is a term for assistive, adaptive, and rehabilitative devices for people with disabilities and the elderly. People with disabilities often have difficulty performing activities of daily living (ADLs) independently, or even with assistance. ADLs are self-care activities that include toileting, walking, eating, bathing, dressing, grooming, and personal device care. Assistive technology can ameliorate the effects of disabilities that limit the ability to perform ADLs.

Adaptive equipment promotes greater independence and creates new opportunities by enabling people to perform tasks they were formerly unable to accomplish, or had great difficulty accomplishing, by providing enhancements to, or changing methods of interacting with, the technology needed to accomplish such tasks to allow for future success. For example, wheelchairs provide independent mobility for those who cannot walk, while assistive eating devices can enable people who cannot feed themselves to do so.

Due to assistive technology, people with disabilities have more opportunities for a positive and easygoing lifestyle, with an increase in "social participation", "security and control", and a greater chance to "reduce institutional costs without significantly increasing household expenses." In schools, assistive technology can be critical for allowing students with disabilities to access the general education curriculum. Students who experience challenges writing or keyboarding, for example, can use voice recognition software instead. Assistive technologies can also help people who are recovering from strokes and people who have sustained injuries that affect their daily tasks.

== Adaptive technology ==
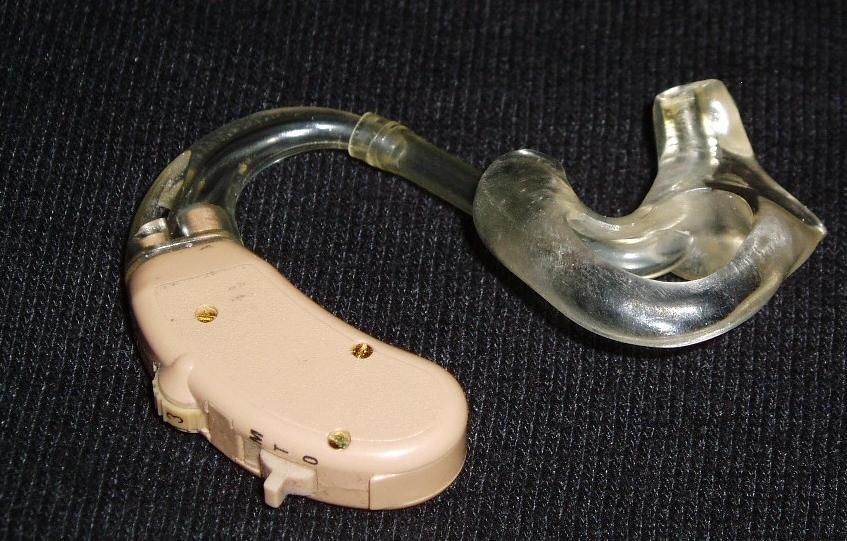
Hearing aid

Adaptive technology and assistive technology are different. Assistive technology is something that is used to help people with disabilities, while adaptive technology covers items that are specifically designed for disabled people and would seldom be used by a non-disabled person. In other words, assistive technology is any object or system that helps people with disabilities, while adaptive technology is specifically designed for disabled people. Consequently, adaptive technology is a subset of assistive technology. Adaptive technology often refers specifically to electronic and information technology access.

Adaptive equipment are devices that are used to assist bathing, dressing, grooming, toileting, and feeding, and other self-care activities that are including in the spectrum of activities of daily living (ADLs). Jennifer McLaughlin Maly a P.T./ D.P.T. in her article located in the journal Exceptional Parent gives a more complete definition of adaptive equipment:

"Typically, a piece of adaptive equipment is utilized to increase a child's function. Examples of adaptive equipment or assistive technology are wheelchairs, lifts, standing frames, gait trainers, augmentative communication devices, bath chairs, and recreational items such as swings or tricycles."

A growing market for adaptive equipment is in the use of mobility vans. In this case, adaptive equipment, also known as assistive technology, can help a person with a disability operate a motor vehicle when otherwise they would not be able to.

== Occupational therapy and assistive technology ==
Based on the definition by the American Occupational Therapy Association, Occupational Therapy (OT) utilizes everyday occupations as a therapeutic tool for enhancing or enabling participation in healthy occupations to promote health and well-being. Occupations include activities of daily living (ADLs), instrumental activities of daily living (IADLs), health management, rest and sleep, education, work, play, leisure, and social participation. In an article for the American Occupational Therapy Association, several occupational therapists wrote: "As occupational therapy professionals, we are uniquely trained to advocate for client-centered care that reduces barriers to participation in meaningful occupations and promotes overall well-being".

OT practitioners (OTP) utilize assistive technologies (AT) to modify environments and promote access and fit to facilitate independence. For example, voice-activated smart home technology allows an individual to control devices such as light switches, thermostat, oven, blinds, and music from any location in their home. OTP evaluate client's strengths and abilities and connects with desired tasks. OTP help empower the client to match specific goals to AT tools.

The theoretical approaches or frameworks OTPs frequently use to guide a client's AT choices may include:

- The HAAT model by Cook, Polgar, and Encarnaçāo (2015);
- The interdependence–Human Activity Assistive Technology Model (I-HAAT) by Lee, et al. (2020);
- The SETT Framework by Zabala (2005);
- The Unified Theory of Acceptance and Use of Technology (UTAUT 2) by Venkatesh, Thong, and Xu (2012).

OTPs may seek advanced training through the Rehabilitation Engineering and Assistive Technology Society of North America (RESNA) organization to receive their Assistive Technology Professional (ATP) Certification and/or Seating and Mobility Specialist (SMS) Certification. Additional trainings and certifications may specialize in a focus area, such as the Certified Assistive Technology Instructional Specialist for Individuals with Visual Impairments (CATIS™).

== Mobility impairments ==
There are several types of assistive devices for mobility aid.

=== Wheelchairs ===
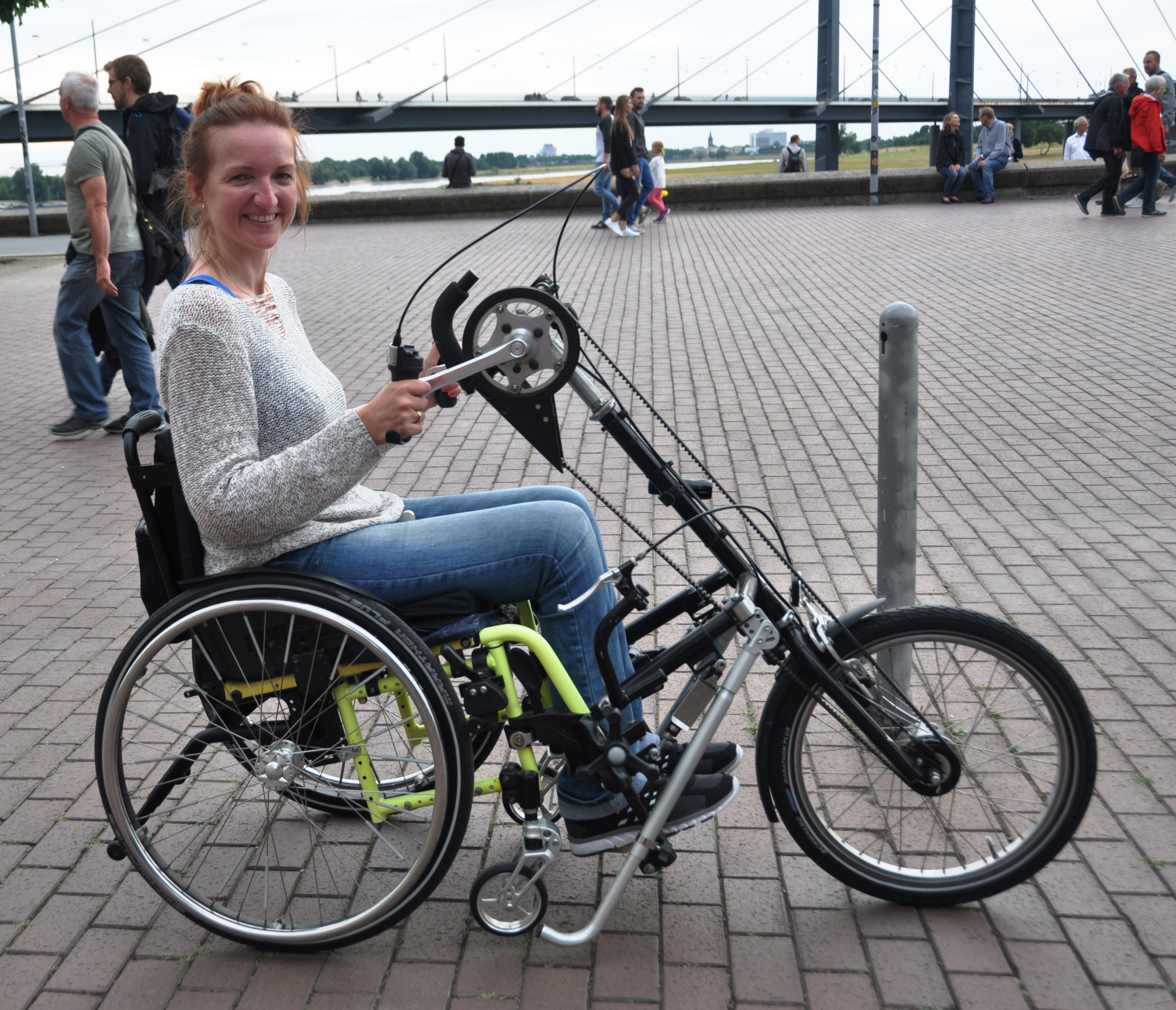
Wheelchair propelled by attached handcycle

A manual or motorized wheelchair is a chair with attached wheels that allows a person to move around when walking is difficult or impossible due to illness, injury, or disability. Ambulatory wheelchair users may use wheelchairs in addition to other devices, such as walkers. Wheelchairs are defined as devices that include a seating system, that can be propelled manually or electrically, and are designed to be a substitute for the normal mobility that most people have. Wheelchairs and other mobility devices allow people to perform mobility-related activities of daily living which include feeding, toileting, dressing, grooming, and bathing.

Wheelchairs have a variety of designs, which may be propelled by hand or by electrical controls of a motor that allows the chair's user to manage the motors and seating control actuators through a joystick, sip-and-puff control, head switches or other input devices. Often, wheelchair designs include handles behind the seat for someone else to push or use the input devices to assist the person in the chair.

Newer advancements in wheelchair designs enable wheelchair users to climb stairs, go off-road, or propel using segway technology, or include additional add-ons like handbikes or power assists.

=== Transfer devices ===
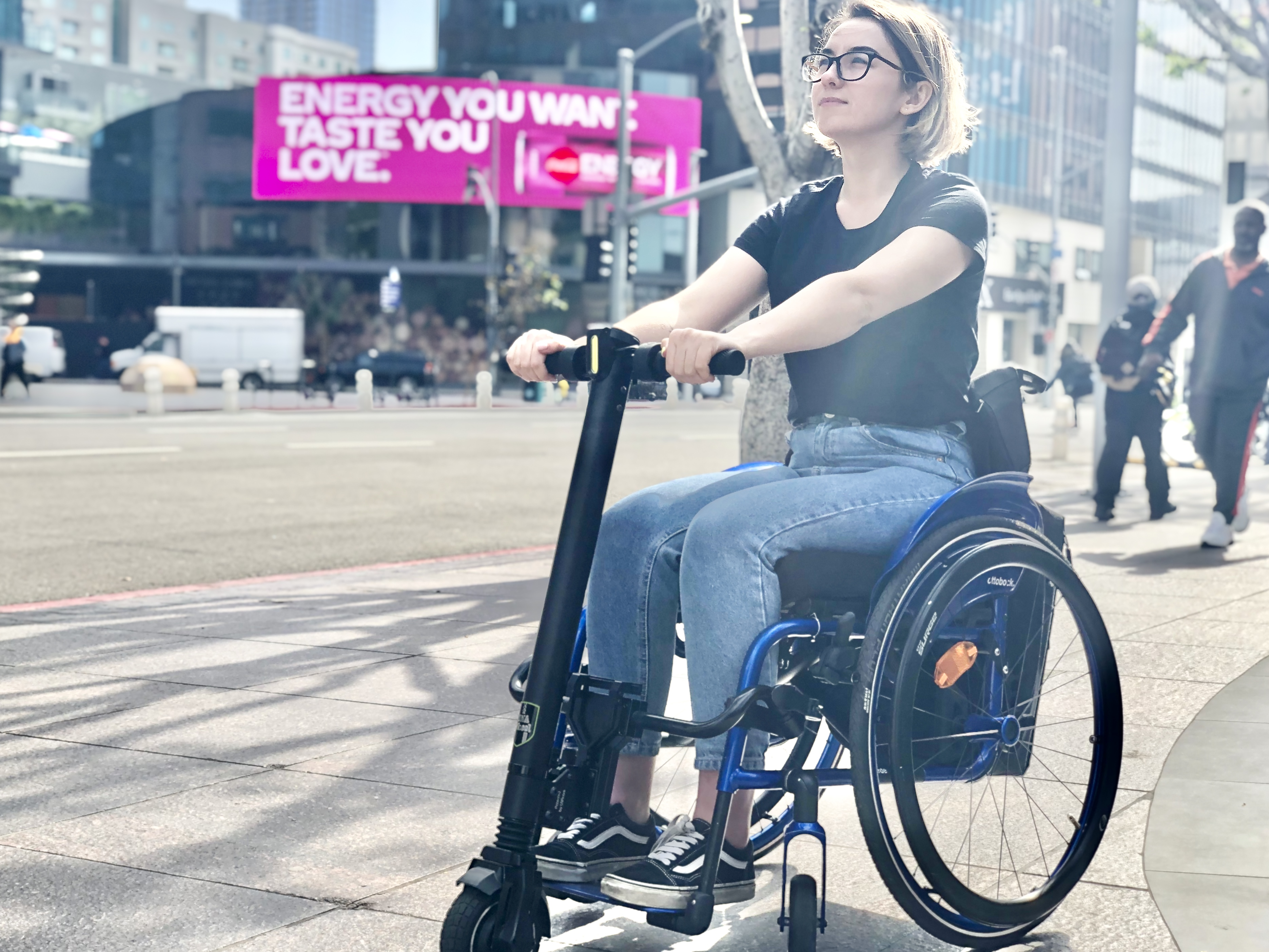
A wheelchair propelled by attached power add-on

Patient transfer devices generally allow patients with impaired mobility to be moved by caregivers between beds, wheelchairs, commodes, toilets, chairs, stretchers, shower benches, automobiles, swimming pools, and other patient support systems (i.e., radiology, surgical, or examining tables).

The most common devices are transfer benches, stretchers or convertible chairs (for lateral, supine transfer), sit-to-stand lifts (for moving patients from one seated position to another, i.e. from wheelchairs to commodes), air-bearing inflatable mattresses (for supine transfer, i.e. transfer from a stretcher to an operating room table), and gait belts (or transfer belt) and a slider board (or transfer board) usually used for transfer from a bed to a wheelchair or from a bed to an operating table. Highly dependent patients who cannot assist their caregiver in moving them often require a patient lift (a floor or ceiling-suspended sling lift); while it was invented in 1955 and in common use since the early 1960s, a patient lift is still considered the state-of-the-art transfer device by the Occupational Safety and Health Administration (OSHA) and the American Nurses Association.

=== Walkers ===
A walker, or walking frame, is a tool for people with disabilities who need additional support to maintain balance or stability while walking. It consists of a frame that is about waist high, approximately twelve inches deep and slightly wider than the user. Walkers are also available in other sizes, such as for children or heavy people. Modern walkers are usually height-adjustable. The front two legs of the walker may or may not have wheels attached to them, depending on the strength and abilities of the person using it. It is also common to see caster wheels or glides on the back legs of a walker with wheels on the front. A walker with three or four wheels is often referred to as a Rollator.

=== Treadmills ===
Bodyweight-supported treadmill training (BWSTT) is used to enhance the walking ability of people with neurological injury. These machines are therapist-assisted devices that are used in the clinical setting, so they are limited by the personnel and labor requirements placed on physical therapists. The BWSTT device, and other devices like it, assist physical therapists by providing task-specific practice of walking for people following neurological injury.

=== Prosthesis ===
A prosthesis, prosthetic, or prosthetic limb is a device that replaces a missing body part or supplements a disabled body part caused by illness, injury, or a birth defect. Prosthetics are part of the field of biomechatronics, the science of using mechanical devices with human muscular, musculoskeletal, and nervous systems to assist or enhance motor control. Inside the body, artificial heart valves are in common use, with artificial hearts and lungs being less commonly used but under active technology development. Other medical devices and aids that can be considered prosthetics include hearing aids, artificial eyes, palatal obturator, gastric bands, and dentures.

Under some circumstances, a prosthesis may end up performing some or all of the same functional purposes as an orthosis (brace or splint), but prostheses are distinct from orthoses. Orthotic devices, or orthoses, are devices used to align, brace, or correct deformities. Orthoses also help to improve the movement of one's joints, spine, or limbs. Prostheses are technically the complete finished item; for instance, a C-Leg knee alone is not a prosthesis, only a prosthetic component. The complete prosthesis would consist of the attachment system to the residual limb (usually a "socket"), and all the attachment hardware components all the way down to and including the terminal device. Despite the technical difference, the terms are often used interchangeably.

An Occupational Therapist's role in prosthetics includes therapy, training, and evaluations. Prosthetic training includes orientation to prosthetic components and terminology, donning and doffing the prosthetic device, wearing schedule, and how to care for the residual limb and the prosthesis.

=== Exoskeletons ===
An exoskeleton is a wearable mobile machine that is powered by a system of electric motors, pneumatics, levers, hydraulics, or a combination of technologies that allow for limb movement with increased strength and endurance. The designs usually aim to provide back support, sense the user's motion, and send a signal to the motors that manage the gears. The exoskeleton supports the shoulder, waist, and thigh, and assists movement for lifting and holding heavy items, while lowering back stress.

=== Adaptive seating and positioning ===
People with balance and motor function challenges often need specialized equipment to sit or stand safely and securely. This equipment is frequently specialized for specific settings, such as in a classroom or nursing home. Positioning is often important in seating arrangements to ensure the user's body pressure is distributed equally, without inhibiting movement in a desired way.

Positioning devices have been developed to assist people with standing and bearing weight on their legs without risk of a fall. These stander devices are generally grouped into two categories based on the position of the occupant. Prone standers distribute the body weight to the front of the individual and usually have a tray in front of them: this makes them good for users who are actively trying to carry out a task. Supine standers distribute the body weight to the back and are good for cases where the user has more limited mobility or is recovering from injury.

=== For children ===
Children with severe disabilities can develop learned helplessness, which makes them lose interest in their environment and harms their education, social interaction, and play. Robotic arms are used to provide an alternative method to engage in joint play activities. These robotic arms allow children to manipulate real objects in the context of play activities.

Children with disabilities have challenges in accessing play and social interactions; play is essential for the physical, emotional, and social well-being of all children. The use of assistive technology has been recommended to facilitate the communication, mobility, and independence of children with disabilities. Augmentative Alternative Communication (AAC) devices have been shown to facilitate the growth and development of language as well as increase rates of symbolic play in children with cognitive disabilities. AAC devices can be no-tech (sign language and body language), low-tech (picture boards, paper and pencils), or high-tech (tablets and speech-generating devices).

The choice of AAC device is very important and should be determined on a case-by-case basis by speech therapists and assistive technology professionals. The early introduction of powered mobility has been shown to positively impact the play and psychosocial skills of children who are unable to move independently. Powered cars, such as the Go Baby Go program, have emerged as a cost-effective means of facilitating the inclusion of children with mobility impairments in school.

== Visual impairments ==
Many people with serious visual impairments live independently, using a wide range of tools and techniques. Examples of assistive technology for visual impairment include screen readers, screen magnifiers, Braille embossers, desktop video magnifiers, and voice recorders.

=== Screen readers ===
Screen readers are used to help the visually impaired easily access electronic information. These software programs run on a computer to convey the displayed information through voice (text-to-speech) or braille (refreshable braille displays), in combination with magnification for low vision users in some cases. There are a variety of platforms and applications available for a variety of costs with differing feature sets.

Some examples of screen readers are Apple VoiceOver, CheckMeister browser, TalkBack and Microsoft Narrator.

Screen readers may rely on the assistance of text-to-speech tools. To use the text-to-speech tools, the documents must be in an electronic form, which is uploaded as the digital format. However, people will usually use the hard copy documents scanned into the computer, which cannot be recognized by the text-to-speech software. To solve this issue, people often use optical character recognition technology accompanied with text-to-speech software.

=== Braille and braille technology ===
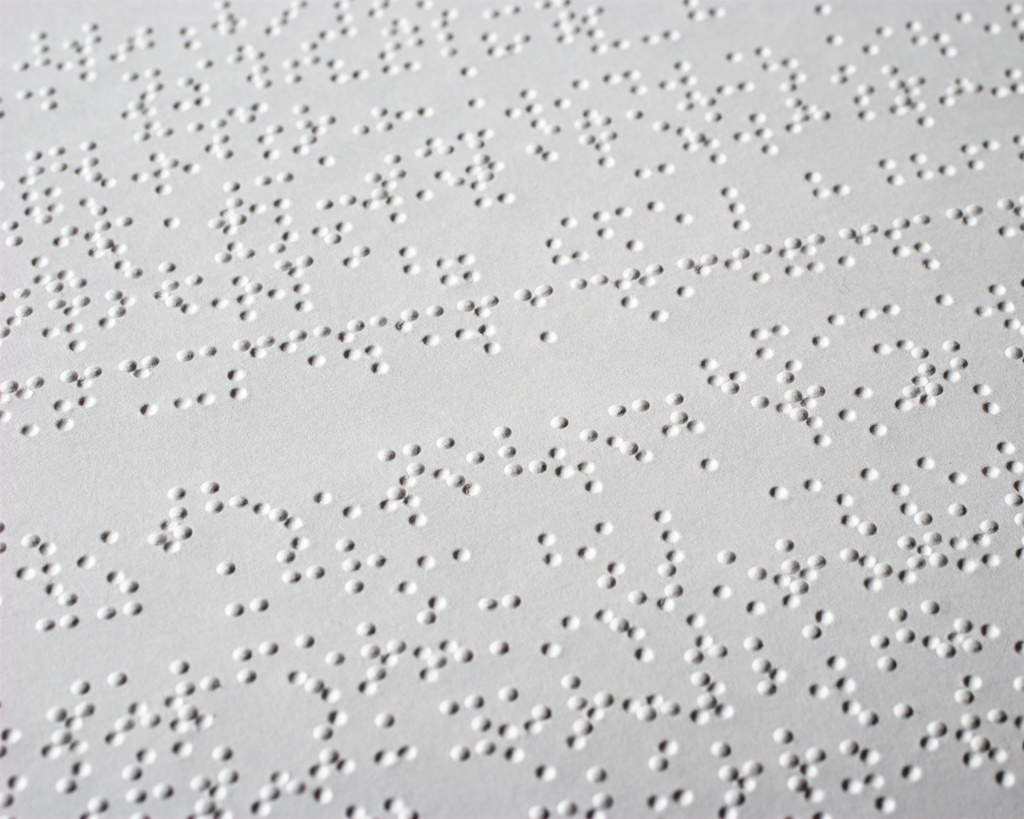
Braille is a system of raised dots representing letters, numbers, punctuation, and words.

Braille is a system of raised bumps that allow blind individuals to read with their fingers. Braille is a code that allows for reading and writing of many different languages and not a language in itself.

==== Braille translator ====
A braille translator is a computer program that can translate text for visual reading into braille or braille into text. A braille translator can be an app on a computer or software built into a website, smartphone, or another braille device.

==== Braille embosser ====
A braille embosser is a printer for braille. Instead of a standard printer that adds ink onto a page, the braille embosser imprints the raised dots of braille onto a page. Some braille embossers combine both braille and ink so the documents can be read with either sight or touch.

==== Refreshable braille display ====
A refreshable braille display, or braille terminal, is an electro-mechanical device for displaying braille characters, usually by means of round-tipped pins raised through holes in a flat surface. Computer users who cannot use a computer monitor can use braille display to read a braille output version of the displayed text.

=== Desktop video magnifier ===
Desktop video magnifiers are electronic devices that use a camera and a display screen to perform digital magnification of printed materials. They enlarge printed pages for those with low or impaired vision. A camera connects to a monitor that displays real-time images, and the user can control settings such as magnification, focus, contrast, underlining, highlighting, and other screen preferences. The devices come in a variety of sizes and styles; some are small and portable with handheld cameras, while others are much larger and mounted on a fixed stand.

=== Screen magnification software ===
A screen magnifier is software that interfaces with a computer's graphical output to present enlarged screen content. It allows users to enlarge the texts and graphics on their computer screens for easier viewing. Similar to desktop video magnifiers, this technology assists people with low or impaired vision. After the user loads the software into their computer's memory, it serves as a kind of "computer magnifying glass": wherever the computer cursor moves, it enlarges the area around it. This improves computer accessibility for a wide range of visual abilities.

=== Large-print and tactile keyboards ===
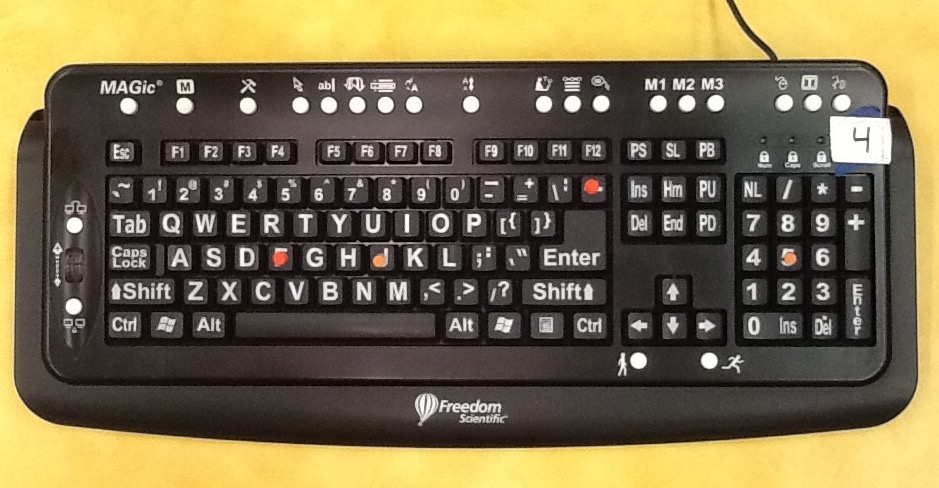
This large-print keyboard has tactile elements and special keys for the visually impaired.

A large-print keyboard has large letters printed on the keys. Accessible keyboards such as this may include round buttons at the top to control software that can magnify the screen (zoom in), change the background color of the screen, or make the mouse cursor on the screen larger. The "bump dots" on the keys, installed in this case by the organization using the keyboards, help the user find the right keys by using tactile sensation.

=== Navigation assistance ===
Assistive technology for navigation has expanded on the IEEE Xplore database since 2000, with over 7,500 engineering articles written on assistive technologies and visual impairment in the past 25 years, and over 1,300 articles on solving the problem of navigation for people who are blind or visually impaired. As well, over 600 articles on augmented reality and visual impairment have appeared in the engineering literature since 2000. Most of these articles were published within the past five years, and the number of articles in this area is increasing every year. GPS, accelerometers, gyroscopes, and cameras can pinpoint the exact location of the user and provide information on what is in the immediate vicinity, and provide assistance in getting to a destination.

=== Wearable technology ===
Wearable technology are smart electronic devices that can be worn on the body as an implant or an accessory. New technologies are exploring how the visually impaired can receive visual information through wearable devices.

Some wearable devices for visual impairment include: OrCam device, eSight and Brainport.

== Personal emergency response systems ==
Personal emergency response systems (PERS), or Telecare (UK term), are a specific type of assistive technology that uses electronic sensors connected to an alarm system to help caregivers manage risk and help vulnerable people stay independent at home longer. An example would be the systems being put in place for senior people such as fall detectors, thermometers (for hypothermia risk), and flooding and unlit gas sensors (for people with mild dementia). Notably, these alerts can be customized to the particular person's risks. When the alert is triggered, a message is sent to a caregiver or contact center who can respond appropriately.

== Accessibility software ==
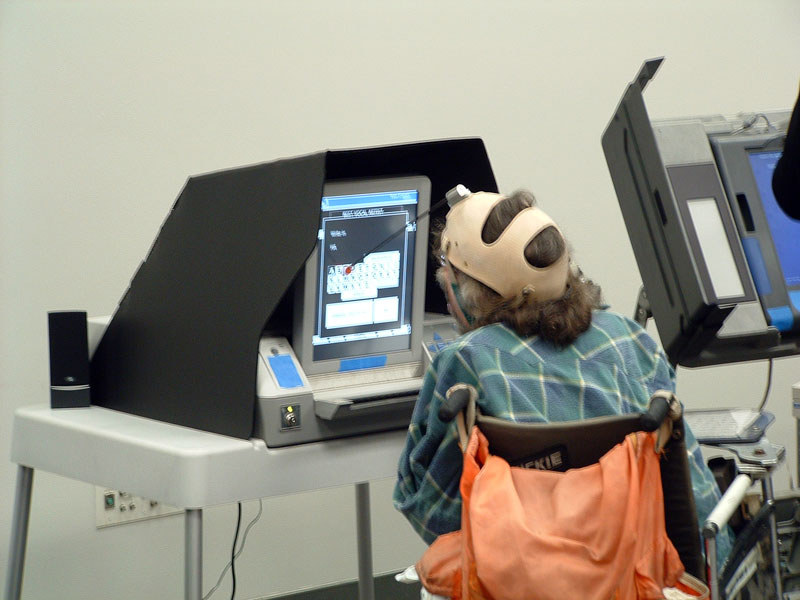
A voter with a manual dexterity disability is making choices on a touchscreen with a head dauber.

In human–computer interaction, computer accessibility (also known as accessible computing) refers to the accessibility of a computer system to all people, regardless of disability or severity of impairment, examples include web accessibility guidelines. Another approach is for the user to present a token to the computer terminal, such as a smart card, that has configuration information to adjust the computer speed, text size, and so on, to their particular needs. This is useful when users want to access public computer based terminals in libraries, information kiosks, ATMs, etc.

The concept is encompassed by the CEN EN 1332-4 Identification Card Systems – Man-Machine Interface. The development of this standard has been supported in Europe by SNAPI and has been successfully incorporated into the Lasseo specifications, but with limited success due to the lack of interest from public computer terminal suppliers.

== Hearing impairments ==
People in the deaf and hard of hearing community have a more difficult time receiving auditory information as compared to hearing individuals. These individuals often rely on visual and tactile mediums for receiving and communicating information. The use of assistive technology and devices provides this community with various solutions to auditory communication needs by providing higher sound (for those who are hard of hearing), tactile feedback, visual cues, and improved technology access.

Individuals who are deaf or hard of hearing use a variety of assistive technologies that provide them with different access to information in numerous environments. Most devices either provide amplified sound or alternate ways to access information through vision and/or vibration. These technologies can be grouped into three general categories: Hearing Technology, alerting devices, and communication support.

=== Hearing aids ===
Hearing aids are devices used by partially deaf individuals to regain a portion of hearing by amplifying sound. This type of assistive technology helps people with hearing loss participate more fully in their hearing communities by allowing them to hear more clearly. They amplify any and all sound waves through use of a microphone, amplifier, and speaker. There is a wide variety of hearing aids available, including digital, in-the-ear, in-the-canal, behind-the-ear, and on-the-body aids.

=== Assistive listening devices ===
Assistive listening devices (ALD) are devices used to amplify sounds an individual wants to hear, especially in areas with a lot of background noise. ALDs can be used with hearing aids and cochlear implants to improve the individual's hearing. Assistive listening devices include FM, infrared, and loop assistive listening devices. This type of technology allows people with hearing difficulties to focus on a speaker or subject by getting rid of extra background noises and distractions, making places like auditoriums, classrooms, and meetings much easier to participate in.

The assistive listening device usually uses a microphone to capture an audio source near to its origin and broadcast it wirelessly over an FM (Frequency Modulation) transmission, IR (Infra Red) transmission, IL (Induction Loop) transmission, or other transmission methods. The person who is listening may use an FM/IR/IL Receiver to tune into the signal and listen at their preferred volume.

=== Amplified telephone equipment ===
Amplified telephone equipment is an assistive technology that enables users to amplify the volume and clarity of their phone calls, so they can easily partake in this medium of communication. There are also options to adjust the frequency and tone of a call to suit their individual hearing needs. Additionally, there is a wide variety of amplified telephones to choose from, with different degrees of amplification. For example, a phone with 26 to 40 decibel range is generally sufficient for mild hearing loss, while a phone with 71 to 90 decibel range is better for more severe hearing loss.

=== Alerting devices ===
Alerting devices are assistive devices that connect with doorbells, telephones, and other alarming devices. These devices add a specific alarm based on one's disability. For instance, a deaf individual can have a doorbell that blinks a light instead of using noise to indicate someone is at the door.

== Augmentative and alternative communication ==
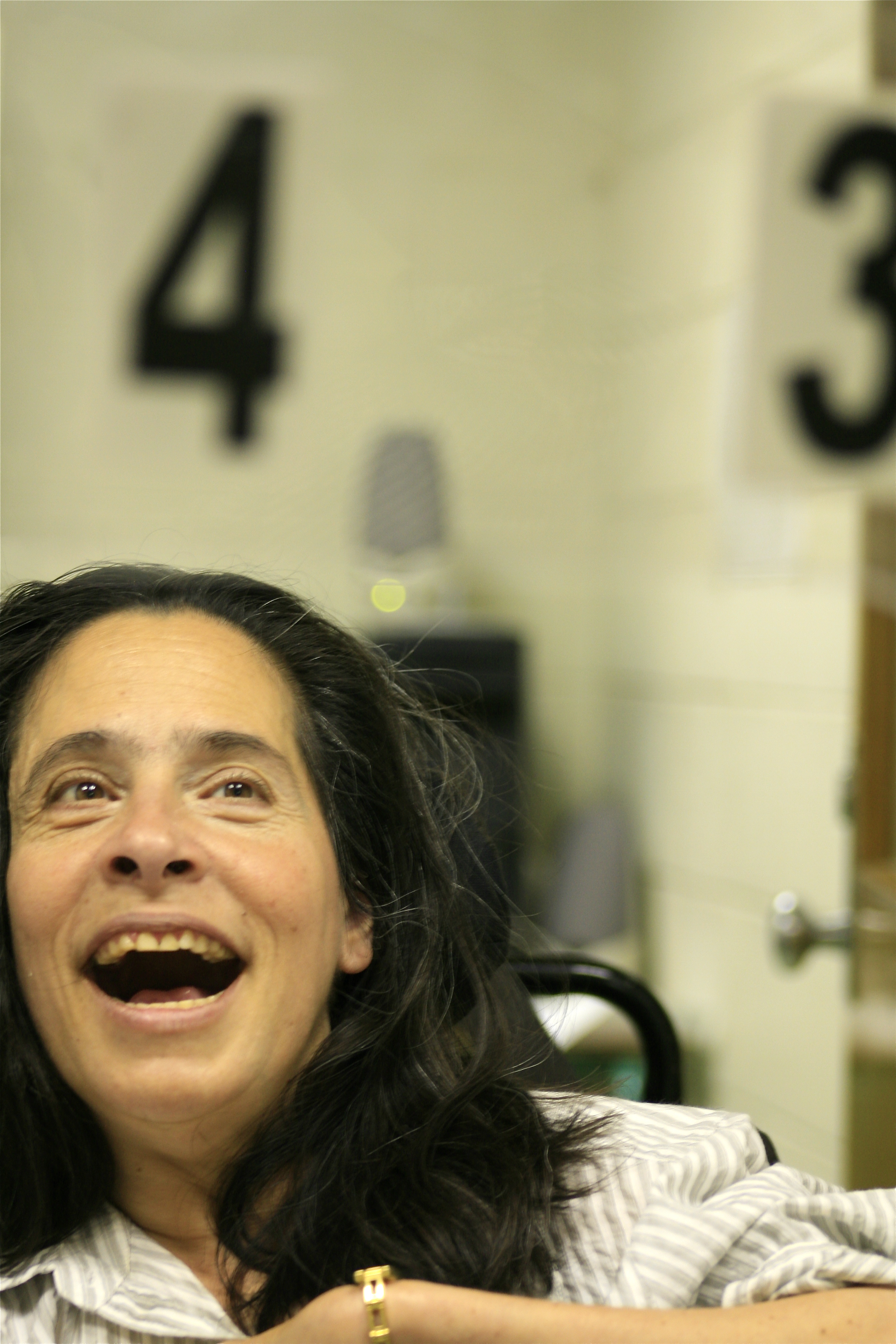
An AAC user uses number coding on an eye gaze communication board.

Augmentative and alternative communication (AAC) is an umbrella term that encompasses methods of communication for those with impairments or restrictions on the production or comprehension of spoken or written language. AAC systems are extremely diverse and depend on the capabilities of the user. They may be as basic as pictures on a board that are used to request food, drink, or other care; or they may involve advanced speech generating devices, based on speech synthesis, that are capable of storing hundreds of phrases and words.

== Cognitive impairments ==
Assistive Technology for Cognition (ATC) is the use of technology (usually high tech) to augment and assist cognitive processes such as attention, memory, self-regulation, navigation, emotion recognition and management, planning, and sequencing activity. Systematic reviews of the field have found that the number of ATC are growing rapidly, but have focused on memory and planning, and that there is emerging evidence for efficacy, with a lot of scope existing to develop new ATC. Examples of ATC include: NeuroPage, which prompts users about meetings, and Wakamaru, which provides companionship and reminds users to take medicine and calls for help if something is wrong, and telephone Reassurance systems.

=== Memory aids ===
Memory aids are any type of assistive technology that helps a user learn and remember certain information. Many memory aids are used for cognitive impairments such as reading, writing, or organizational difficulties. For example, a Smartpen records handwritten notes by creating both a digital copy and an audio recording of the text. Users simply tap certain parts of their notes, the pen saves it, and reads it back to them. From there, the user can also download their notes onto a computer for increased accessibility. Digital voice recorders are also used to record "in the moment" information for fast and easy recall at a later time.

A 2017 Cochrane Review highlighted the current lack of high-quality evidence to determine whether assistive technology effectively supports people with dementia to manage memory issues. Thus, it is not presently clear whether, or to what extent, assistive technology is beneficial for memory problems.

=== Educational software ===
Educational software is software that assists people with reading, learning, comprehension, and organizational difficulties. Any accommodation software such as text readers, notetakers, text enlargers, organization tools, word predictions, and talking word processors falls under the category of educational software.

== Eating impairments ==
Adaptive eating devices include items commonly used by the general population like spoons and forks and plates; however, the tools become assistive technology when they are modified to accommodate the needs of people who have difficulty using standard cutlery due to a disabling condition. Common modifications include increasing the size of the utensil handle to make it easier to grasp. Plates and bowls may have a guard on the edge that stops food being pushed off of the dish when it is being scooped. More sophisticated equipment for eating includes manual and powered feeding devices. These devices support those who have little or no hand and arm function, enabling them to eat independently.

== In sports ==
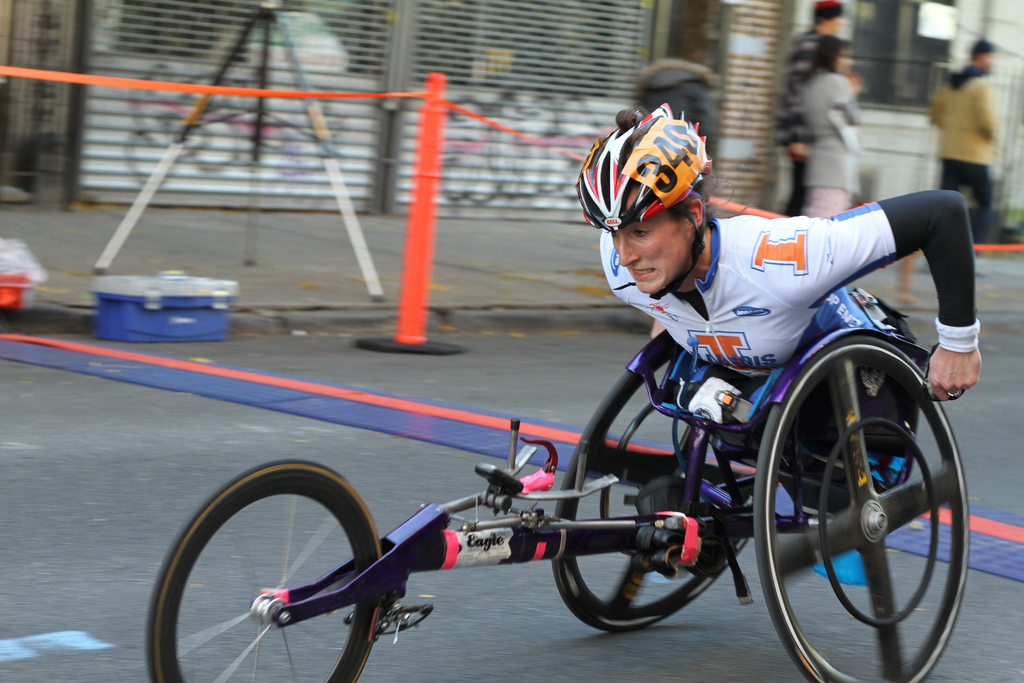
A New York City Marathon competitor using a racing wheelchair.

Assistive technology in sports is an area of technology design that is growing. Assistive technology is the array of new devices created to enable sports enthusiasts who have disabilities to play. Assistive technology may be used in adaptive sports, where an existing sport is modified to enable players with a disability to participate; alternatively, assistive technology may be used to invent completely new sports with athletes with disabilities exclusively in mind.

An increasing number of people with disabilities are participating in sports, leading to the development of new assistive technology. Assistive technology devices can be simple, or "low-technology", or they may use highly advanced technology. "Low-tech" devices can include velcro gloves and adaptive bands and tubes. "High-tech" devices can include all-terrain wheelchairs and adaptive bicycles. Accordingly, assistive technology can be found in sports ranging from local community recreation to the elite Paralympic Games.

According to the Assistive Technology Assessment Handbook, more complex assistive technology devices have been developed over time, and as a result, sports for people with disabilities "have changed from being a clinical therapeutic tool to an increasingly competition-oriented activity".

== In education ==
In the United States, there are two major pieces of legislation that govern the use of assistive technology within the school system. The first is Section 504 of the Rehabilitation Act of 1973 and the second being the Individuals with Disabilities Education Act (IDEA) which was first enacted in 1975 under the name The Education for All Handicapped Children Act.

In 2004, during the reauthorization period for IDEA, the National Instructional Material Access Center (NIMAC) was created, which provided a repository of accessible text including publisher's textbooks to students with a qualifying disability. Files provided are in XML format and used as a starting platform for braille readers, screen readers, and other digital text software. IDEA defines assistive technology as follows: "any item, piece of equipment, or product system, whether acquired commercially off the shelf, modified, or customized, that is used to increase, maintain, or improve functional capabilities of a child with a disability. (B) Exception.--The term does not include a medical device that is surgically implanted, or the replacement of such device."

According to an article in the Education Sciences journal, assistive technology listed in a student's Individualized Education Program (IEP) is not only recommended, it is required. These devices help students both with and without disabilities access the curriculum in a way they were previously unable to. Occupational therapists play an important role in educating students, parents, and teachers about the assistive technology they may interact with.

Assistive technology in this area is broken down into low, mid, and high tech categories. Low tech encompasses equipment that is often low cost and does not include batteries or require charging; examples include adapted paper and pencil grips for writing, or masks and color overlays for reading. Mid tech supports used in the school setting include the use of handheld spelling dictionaries and portable word processors used for keyboard writing. High tech supports involve the use of tablet devices and computers with accompanying software; software supports for writing include the use of auditory feedback while typing, word prediction for spelling, and speech-to-text. Supports for reading include the use of text-to-speech (TTS) software and font modification via access to digital text. Limited supports are available for math instruction and mostly consist of grid-based software to allow younger students to keyboard equations, and auditory feedback of more complex equations using MathML and Daisy.

== Computer accessibility ==
A sip-and-puff device which allows a person with substantial disability to make selections and navigate computerized interfaces by controlling inhalations and exhalations

One of the largest problems that affect disabled people is discomfort with prostheses. An experiment performed in Massachusetts used 20 people with various sensors attached to their arms: the participants tried different arm exercises, and the sensors recorded their movements. All of the data helped engineers develop new engineering concepts for prosthetics.

Assistive technology may attempt to improve the ergonomics of the devices themselves, such as the Dvorak keyboard and other alternative keyboard layouts, which offer more ergonomic layouts of the keys. Assistive technology devices have been created to enable disabled people to use modern touch screen mobile computers, such as the iPad, iPhone and iPod Touch. The Pererro is a plug and play adapter for iOS devices which uses the built in Apple VoiceOver feature in combination with a basic switch: this brings touch screen technology to those who were previously unable to use it.

Apple, with the release of iOS 7, had introduced the ability to navigate apps using switch control. Switch access could be activated either through an external bluetooth connected switch, single touch of the screen, or use of right and left head turns using the device's camera. Additional accessibility features include the use of Assistive Touch, which allows a user to access multi-touch gestures through pre-programmed onscreen buttons.

For users with physical disabilities, a large variety of switches are available and customizable to the user's needs, which vary in size, shape, or amount of pressure required for activation. Switch access may be placed near any area of the body which has consistent and reliable mobility and less subject to fatigue. Common sites include the hands, head, and feet. Eye gaze and head mouse systems can also be used as an alternative mouse navigation. A user may use single or multiple switch sites, and the process often involves scanning through items on a screen and activating the switch once the desired object is highlighted.

== Home automation ==
The form of home automation called assistive domotics focuses on making it possible for elderly and disabled people to live independently. Home automation is becoming a viable option for elderly and disabled people who would prefer to stay in their own homes rather than move to a healthcare facility. This field uses much of the same technology and equipment as home automation for security, entertainment, and energy conservation but tailors it for elderly and disabled users. For example, automated prompts and reminders use motion sensors and pre-recorded audio messages; an automated prompt in the kitchen may remind the resident to turn off the oven, and one by the front door may remind the resident to lock the door.

== Assistive technology and innovation ==
Innovation is happening in assistive technology either through improvements to existing devices or the creation of new products.

In 2021, the World Intellectual Property Organization (WIPO) published a report on Technology Trends, with assistive products grouped into either conventional or emerging technologies. Conventional assistive technology tracks innovation within well-established assistive products, whereas emerging assistive technology refers to more advanced products. These identified advanced assistive products are distinguished from the conventional ones by the use of one or more enabling technologies (for instance, artificial intelligence, Internet of things, advanced sensors, new material, Additive Manufacturing, advanced robotics, augmented and virtual reality), or by the inclusion of implantable products/components. Such emerging assistive products are either more sophisticated or more functional versions of conventional assistive products, or completely novel assistive devices.

For instance, in conventional self-care assistive technology, technologies involved typically include adaptive clothing, adaptive eating devices, incontinence products, assistive products for manicure, pedicure, hair and facial care, dental care, or assistive products for sexual activities. In comparison, emerging self-care assistive technologies include health and emotion monitoring, smart diapers, smart medication dispensing and management, or feeding assistant robots. Although the distinction between conventional and emerging technologies is not always clear-cut, emerging assistive technology tends to be "smarter", using AI and being more connected and interactive, and including body-integrated solutions or components.

To a great extent this « conventional » versus « emerging » classification is based on the World Health Organization's Priority Assistive Products List (APL) and the ISO 9999 standard for assistive products for persons with disabilities: the APL delineating the absolute minimum that countries should be offering to their citizens, and ISO 9999 defining those products which are already well established in the market.

=== Patenting activity ===
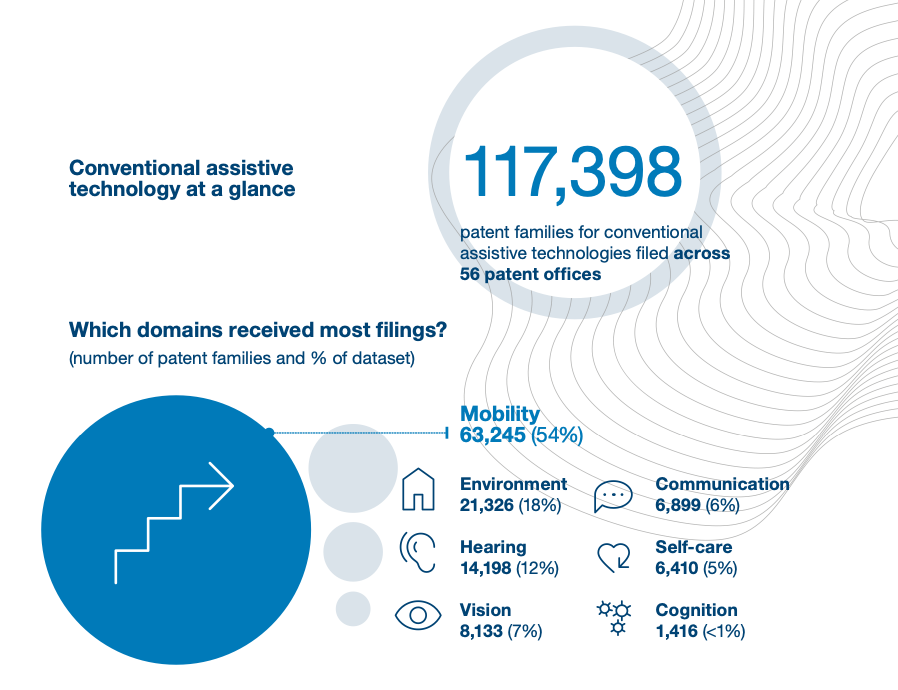
Conventional assistive technologies patent filings between 2013 and 2017. 177,398 patent families have been filed. 64% of the filings are in the Mobility assistive technology.

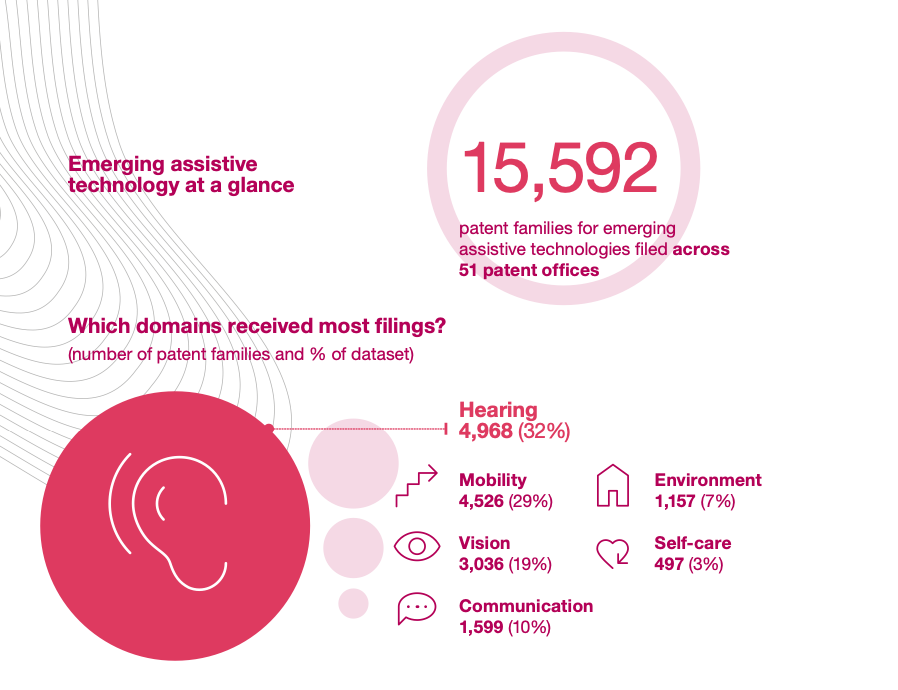
Emerging assistive technologies patent fillings between 2013 and 2017. 15,592 patents families have been filed. 32% of the filings are in the Hearing assistive technology.

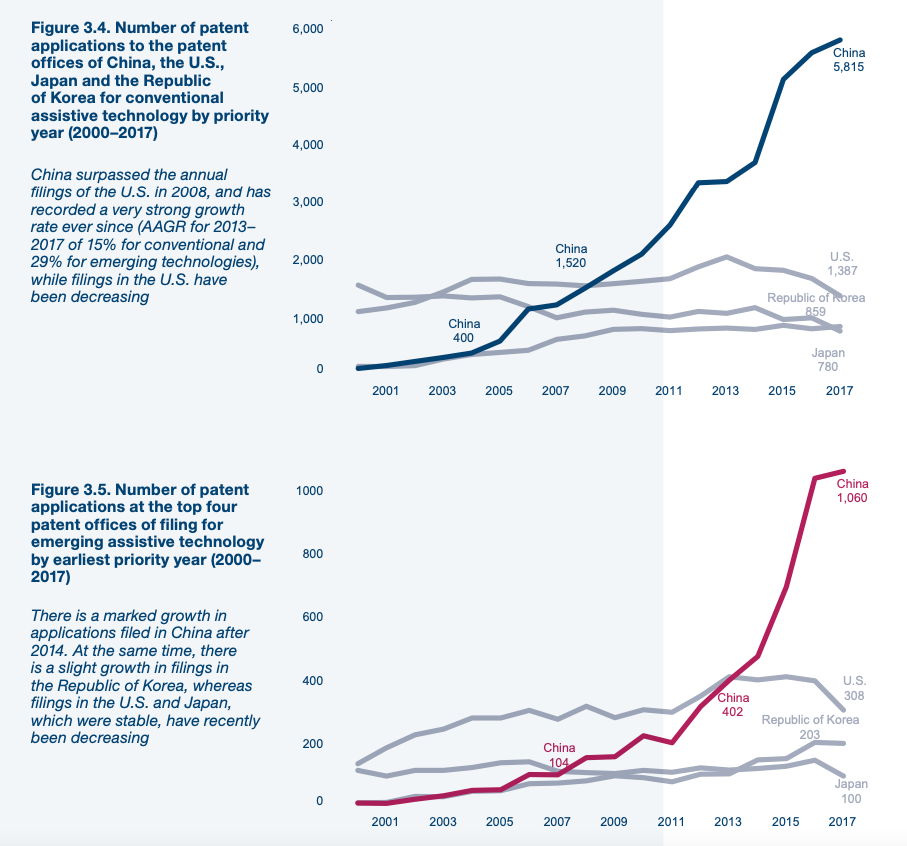
Number of patent applications for conventional (top) and emerging (bottom) assistive technologies between 2000 and 2017. China surpassed the annual filings of the US in 2008 and has recorded a very strong growth ever since in both conventional and emerging sectors.

The status of "well-established products" is reflected in the patent filings for assistive technologies between 2013 and 2017. Patent registrations for assistive technologies identified as conventional are nearly eight times larger than the ones for emerging assistive technologies. However, patent filings related to more recent emerging assistive technologies are growing almost three times as fast as those pertaining to conventional ones. Patent filings in both conventional and emerging assistive technology are highly concentrated on mobility, hearing and vision. Investment in emerging assistive technology also focuses on environment. In the conventional sector, mobility represent 54% of all patents fillings and is an indication of increased interest in advanced mobility assistive product categories, such as advanced prosthetics, walking aids, wheelchairs, and exoskeletons.

In the past, the top patent offices for filing, and therefore perceived target markets, in assistive technology have been the United States and Japan. However, patenting activity has been declining in these two jurisdictions. At the same time, there has been a surge in patent filings in China and an increase in filings in the Republic of Korea. This pattern is observed for both conventional and emerging assistive technology, with China's annual filings surpassing those of the US in 2008 for conventional and 2014 for emerging assistive technology. Patent filings related to conventional assistive technology have also declined in Europe, especially in Germany, France, the Netherlands and Norway.

Patenting activity indicates the amount of interest and the investment made in respect to an invention's applicability and its commercialization potential. There is typically a lag between filing a patent application and commercialization, with a product being classified in various stages of readiness levels, research concept, proof of concept, minimum viable product, and finally commercial product. According to the 2021 WIPO report, the emerging technologies closest to a fully commercial product included:

- myoelectric control of advanced prosthetics and wheelchair control (mobility);
- environment-controlling hearing aids (hearing);
- multifocal intraocular lenses and artificial retina, along with Virtual and Augmented Reality wearables (vision);
- smart assistants and navigation aids (communication);
- smart home appliances (environment);
- medication management and smart diapers (self-care).

The technology readiness level and the related patenting activity can also be explained through the following factors, which contribute to a product's entry to market: such as the expected impact on a person's participation in different aspects of life; the ease of adoption (need for training, fitting, additional equipment for interoperability, and so on); the societal acceptance and potential ethical concerns; and the need for regulatory approval. This is mainly the case for assistive technology that qualifies as medical technology.

Among these aspects, acceptability and ethical considerations are particularly relevant to those technologies that are extremely invasive (such as cortical or auditory brainstem implants), or replace the human caregiver and human interaction, or collect and use data on cloud-based services or interconnected devices (e.g., companion robots, smart nursing and health-monitoring technologies), raising privacy issues and requiring connectivity, or raising safety concerns such as with autonomous wheelchairs.

Beyond the patent landscape, industrial designs have an added importance for the field of assistive technology. Assistive technology is often not adopted, or else abandoned entirely, because of issues to do with design (lack of appeal) or comfort (poor ergonomics). Design often plays a role after the patenting activity, as a product needs to be re-designed for mass production.

== Impact ==
Overall, assistive technology aims to allow disabled people to "participate more fully in all aspects of life (home, school, and community)" and increases their opportunities for "education, social interactions, and potential for meaningful employment". It creates greater independence and control for disabled individuals. For example, in one study of 1,342 infants, toddlers and preschoolers, all with some kind of developmental, physical, sensory, or cognitive disability, the use of assistive technology created improvements in child development. These included improvements in "cognitive, social, communication, literacy, motor, adaptive, and increases in engagement in learning activities".

Additionally, assistive technology has been found to lighten caregiver load. Both family and professional caregivers benefit from assistive technology; through its use, the time that a family member or friend would need to care for a patient significantly decreases. However, studies show that care time for a professional caregiver increases when assistive technology is used: although, their work load is significantly easier as the assistive technology frees them of having to perform certain tasks. There are several platforms that use machine learning to identify the appropriate assistive device to suggest to patients, making assistive devices more accessible.

== Stigma and barriers ==
Research on assistive technology use and disability suggests that stigma is influenced by both societal and environmental factors. Studies of students using AT for learning disabilities have found mixed associations between frequency of use and stigma-related experiences, with some users reporting embarrassment and social concerns related to visibility in classroom settings, while also identifying barriers such as technical difficulties and limited institutional support. Design features of assistive technologies have also been linked to stigma perceptions, with less visibly medical or more aesthetic, modern devices associated with reduced perceived stigma, lower social anxiety, and greater acceptance of use.

Broader research in diverse cultural contexts has similarly identified stigma as shaped by societal beliefs about the causes of disability, cultural and religious attitudes, stereotypes about the capabilities of people with disabilities, environmental barriers, and limited opportunities for positive interaction between disabled and non-disabled groups. In older adults, age-related stereotypes were also reported as a barrier to use.

Sex and gender have also been found to influence outcomes of assistive technology across multiple domains, with evidence suggesting unequal impacts shaped by design, social norms, and access barriers, with women more likely to experience negative outcomes.

== History ==
In 1988, the National Institute on Disability and Rehabilitation Research (NIDILRR) awarded Gaulladet University a grant for a project called, "Robotic finger spelling hand for communication and access to text by deaf-blind persons". Researchers at the university developed and tested a robotic hand; although it was never commercialized, the concept is relevant for current and future research.

Many other grants have been written since the one in 1988, with NIDILRR-funded research moving from the fabrication of robotic arms that can be used by disabled persons to perform daily activities, to the development of robotics that assist with therapy in the hopes of achieving long-term performance gains. If there is success in development of robotics, these mass-marketed products could assist longer-living elderly individuals enough to postpone nursing home stays: "Jim Osborn, executive director of the Quality of Life Technology Center, told a 2007 gathering of long-term care providers that if such advances could delay all nursing home admissions by a month, societal savings could be $1 billion monthly". The shortage of both paid personal assistants and available family members makes artificial assistance a necessity.

== World Health Organization Initiatives ==
=== rATA ===
The rapid Assistive Technology Assessment (rATA) is a tool developed by the World Health Organization in order to undertake household surveys which can measure various parameters needed to access assistive technology and to make informed policies for governments around the world.

=== GATE ===
In 2014, the World Health Organization established the Global Cooperation on Assistive Technology (GATE) to improve worldwide access to AT, alongside the WHO-GATE 5P framework. The framework outlines five key areas: People, Policy, Products, Provision, and Personnel. "People" focuses on individuals who use or may use AT, while "Policy" encompasses the laws, regulations, and systems that regulate access. "Product" covers the assistive technologies themselves, "Provision" helps ensure these technologies are accessible, and "Personnel" includes the workforce involved in providing and supporting AT use.

== See also ==
- Accessibility
- Adaptive fashion
- Assistance dog
- Assisted living
- Augmentative and alternative communication
- Braille technology
- Design for All (in ICT)
- Disability Flag
- Durable medical equipment
- OATS: Open Source Assistive Technology Software
- Occupational therapy
- Powered exoskeleton
- Rehabilitation robotics
- Soft robotics
- Transgenerational design
- Universal access to education

== Bibliography ==
- American Speech-Language-Hearing Association. (2005). "Roles and Responsibilities of Speech-Language Pathologists With Respect to Augmentative and Alternative Communication: Position Statement". Archived from the original on February 13, 2009.
- DeCoste, Denise C. (1997). "Chapter 10: Introduction to Augmentative and Alternative Communication Systems". In Glennen, Sharon; DeCoste, Denise C. (eds.). Handbook Of Augmentative And Alternative Communication. San Diego, CA: Singular Publishing Group. ISBN 978-1-56593-684-3.
- Schlosser, R. W.; Wendt, O. (2008). "Effects of augmentative and alternative communication intervention on speech production in children with autism: a systematic review". American Journal of Speech-Language Pathology. 17 (3): 212–230. doi:10.1044/1058-0360(2008/021). PMID 18663107.
- Beukelman, David R.; Mirenda, Pat (2005). Augmentative & alternative communication: supporting children & adults with complex communication needs (3rd ed.). Paul H. Brookes Publishing Company. ISBN 978-1-55766-684-0.
- Galvão Filho, T. (2009). Tecnologia Assistiva para uma Escola Inclusiva: apropriação, demandas e perspectivas (Doutorado em Educação) (in Portuguese). Salvador, Brazil: Faculdade de Educação, Universidade Federal da Bahia.
- Gillam, Ronald Bradley; Marquardt, Thomas P.; Martin, Frederick N. (2000). Communication sciences and disorders: from science to clinical practice. Jones & Bartlett Learning. ISBN 978-0-7693-0040-5.
- Mirenda, P. (2003). "Toward Functional Augmentative and Alternative Communication for Students With Autism: Manual Signs, Graphic Symbols, and Voice Output Communication Aids" (PDF). Language, Speech, and Hearing Services in Schools. 34 (3): 203–216. doi:10.1044/0161-1461(2003/017). PMID 27764322. S2CID 11595254. Archived (PDF) from the original on October 9, 2022.
- Mathy; Yorkston, K.; Guttman (2000). "Augmentative Communication for Individuals with Amyotrophic Lateral Sclerosis". In Beukelman, D.; Yorkston, K.; Reichle, J. (eds.). Augmentative and Alternative Communication Disorders for Adults with Acquired Neurologic Disorders. Baltimore: P. H. Brookes Pub. ISBN 978-1-55766-473-0.
- Jans, Deborah; Clark, Sue (1998). "Chapter 6: High Technology Aids to Communication". In Wilson, Allan (ed.). Augmentative Communication in Practice: An Introduction. University of Edinburgh. ISBN 978-1-898042-15-0. Archived from the original on July 8, 2015.
- Parette, H. P.; Brotherson, M. J; Huer, M. B. (2000). "Giving families a voice in augmentative and alternative communication decision-making". Education and Training in Mental Retardation and Developmental Disabilities. 35 (2): 177–190. doi:10.1177/215416470003500206.
- Assistive Technology in Education: A Teacher's Guide, Amy Foxwell, 15 February 2022.
