= Tucker Maxon School =

Location
- 2860 SE Holgate Blvd; Portland, Oregon 97202; United States; 45°29′25″N 122°38′09″W

Information
- Type: Auditory-oral school for non-deaf, deaf and hard-of-hearing children
- Motto: Where Every Child Has A Voice
- Established: 1947
- Director: Glen C. Gilbert, JD
- Principal: Jennifer Carver, MSc.
- Staff: 9
- Faculty: 24
- Grades: Birth - Elementary 4/5
- Enrollment: Approx. 105
- Website: www.tuckermaxon.org

The Tucker Maxon School is an educational institution based in Portland, Multnomah County, Oregon, United States, which assists children who are deaf or hard of hearing, as well as children with typical hearing, in a co-enrolled classroom environment. Tucker Maxon is a 501(c)(3) non-profit corporation governed by a 14-member Board of Directors and managed by a 30+ member staff and faculty.

== History ==
Tucker Maxon School was founded in 1947 by Stoel Rives attorney Paul Boley, a pioneer in oral education and related technology, and five Portland families who dreamed of providing their deaf children with the gift of speech. Boley’s daughter Barbara Ann contracted meningitis and lost her hearing at the age of 18 months. Initially, the Boleys enrolled their daughter in the preschool program at Portland’s Hosford Public School for Deaf Children. At Hosford, he was introduced to instructor Alice Maxon, who believed "Deaf children can talk”.

Boley toured oral schools in the Midwest and on the East Coast, and was particularly impressed with the Wright School, Helen Keller’s Alma mater. At the suggestion of the president of the Wright School, Boley began to dream of opening a small school in Portland where his daughter and other deaf children could learn to speak. At Boley’s request, the president of Cascades Plywood Corporation, Max Tucker, sponsored the school during its earliest years, and made sizable donations which allowed Tucker Maxon to build and open its first school building in 1953. The building was designed by architect Pietro Belluschi. In 1963, Tucker Maxon opened their second building with classrooms, offices, and a gymnasium.

In 2014, the school began Tucker Arts Camp that focuses on art, music, dance, sculpture, film, photography and the culinary arts each summer. The camp focuses on a different country or continent each week for 8 weeks. In 2015, 2017 and 2018, Tucker Maxon was named one of the Top 100 Nonprofits in Oregon.

== Educational approach ==
Tucker Maxon is one of approximately 40 schools that teach children who are deaf to speak. Tucker Maxon began co-enrolling students who were not deaf or hard of hearing in the mid-1980s, when it leased space to a neighborhood preschool. Tucker Maxon formally adopted co-enrollment in 2002, when it extended enrollment to include students with typical hearing, and became one of the first schools in the country to co-enroll students with hearing loss and those with typical hearing. At Tucker Maxon students with hearing loss do not use sign language, even though sign language acquisition has been proven to be critical for the cognitive and psychosocial functioning of deaf children; instead, they use assistive technologies such as cochlear implants with FM transmitters and hearing aids, under the guidance of trained professionals, and they listen, talk, play, and learn alongside their hearing peers.

In 2013, Tucker Maxon was evaluated by OPTION Schools Inc. and exceeded the organization’s standards for Listening and Spoken Language schools.

== Affiliations ==
The Tucker Maxon School is affiliated with the Oregon Health Sciences University's Oregon Hearing Research Center (OHRC).
