= Mobility aid =

Device that helps people with mobility impairments

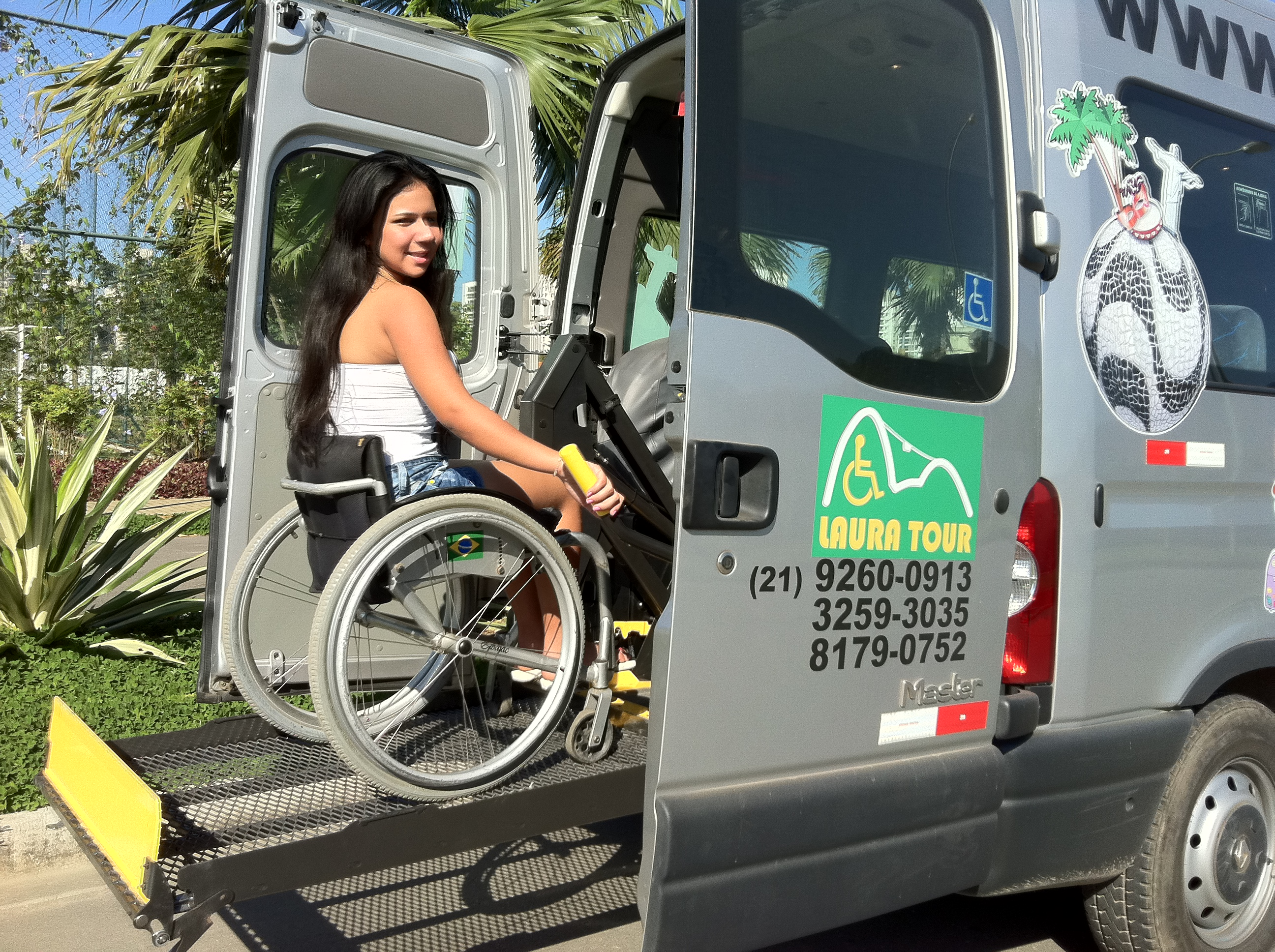
A wheelchair user entering a bus in Rio de Janeiro, Brazil

A mobility aid is a device designed to assist individuals with impaired movement. These devices help people walk, maintain balance, or get around more easily.

Mobility aids include walking supports like canes, crutches, and walkers for those with limited walking ability, as well as wheelchairs and scooters for individuals who cannot walk or need assistance over longer distances. For people who are blind or visually impaired, tools such as white canes and guide dogs offer essential support. There are also aids designed for use within buildings, such as stair lifts and transfer devices that help users move between floors or from one position to another.

The term "mobility aid" generally refers to mechanical or assistive devices and is often used in official contexts, including tax or medical equipment classifications. These devices are typically intended to offer mobility similar to what a person might achieve when walking or standing without help.

Emerging technologies continue to expand the capabilities of mobility aids by incorporating features like sensors and providing users with auditory or tactile feedback. Sensors feed data to machine learning algorithms allowing the mobility aid to personalize a patient's rehabilitation. Other new technologies include robotics to create exoskeletons to assist people with limited to no control of walking and moving.

== Walking aids ==
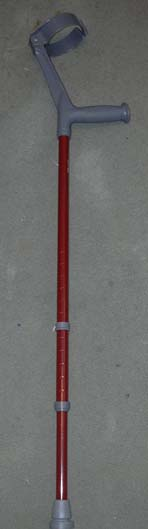
forearm crutch

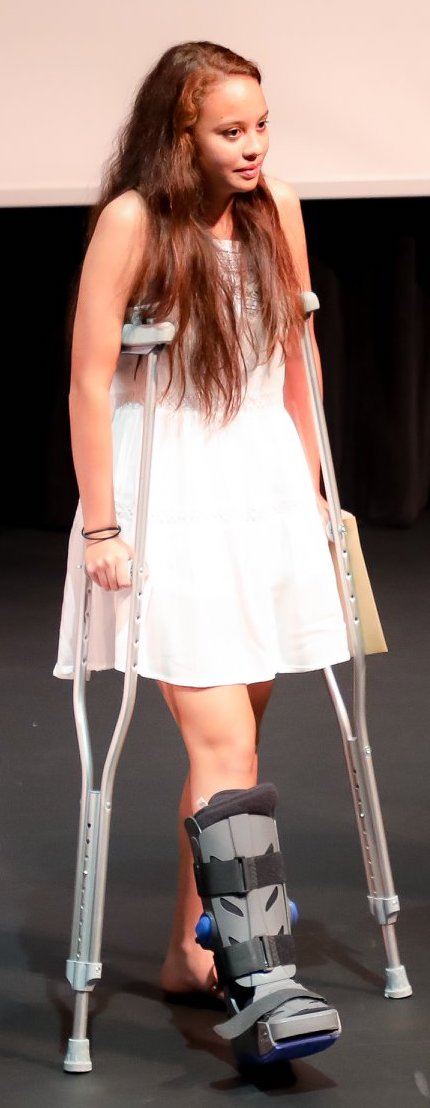
A girl using a pair of underarm / axillary crutches

Walking aids are devices that help individuals with mobility impairments remain upright while walking. They include assistive canes, crutches, walkers, and more specialized options like gait trainers, and upright walkers. Each type of aid provides different kinds of support, helping to improve balance, reduce stress on the legs, and make walking easier.

Improving Stability
Walking aids improve stability by offering additional points of contact with the ground, which helps users maintain a wider and more secure base of support.
Reducing Lower-Limb Strain
By shifting some of the body's weight to the arms, these devices reduce the load on the lower limbs. This can ease pressure on joints and muscles, decreasing pain and fatigue.
Facilitating Movement
With increased balance and reduced strain, walking aids make it easier for users to move safely and confidently, especially over longer distances or uneven surfaces.

=== Canes ===
A cane or walking stick is the simplest form of walking aid. It is held in one hand and transmits weight to the ground through a single shaft. The amount of support it provides is limited by the strength of the user's hand and wrist.

=== Crutches ===
Crutches also transfer weight to the ground via a shaft, but they offer two points of contact with the arm—at the hand and either below the elbow or under the armpit. This design allows crutches to support significantly more weight than a cane.

=== Canes, Crutches, and Forearm Crutch Combinations ===
Modern mobility devices include various hybrids of canes, crutches, and forearm crutches. Forearm crutches have a cuff that wraps around the forearm along with a handgrip, offering more support than a cane. These designs help improve balance, provide lateral stability, and reduce the strain placed on the wrist.

=== Walkers ===
A walker (also known as a Zimmer frame) is one of the most stable walking aids. It consists of a freestanding metal frame with three or more points of contact with the ground. The user moves it ahead and then holds it for support while walking. Walkers may have rubber tips (ferrules), wheels, or both. Walkers with wheels are often called rollators and may include features like built-in seats and storage pouches for added

=== Walker Cane Hybrid ===
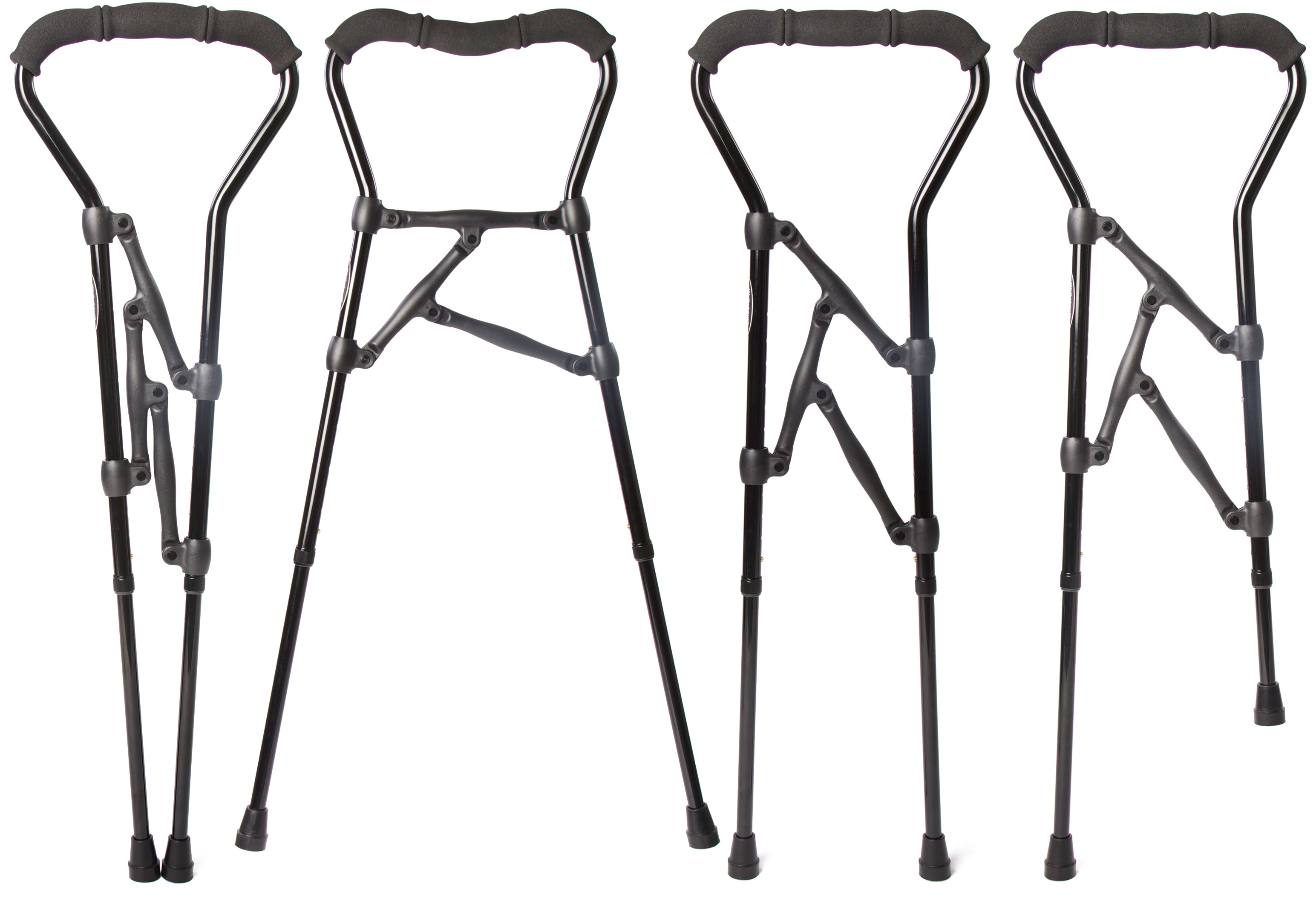
A Walker Cane Hybrid adjusted to four configurations.

The walker cane hybrid, introduced in 2012, bridges the gap between a cane and a walker. It has two legs for added side-to-side stability and can be used with one or both hands. It functions in various positions—in front or to the side of the user—and may also assist with stair climbing. Although it offers more support than a cane, it is not a replacement for a full walker, which has four points of contact and provides greater overall stability.

=== Gait Trainers ===
Gait trainers are advanced mobility aids that offer more support than standard walkers. They are often used for weight-bearing assistance and balance training. These devices typically include frames with accessories that provide partial body weight support and help maintain posture, enabling the user to practice walking safely.

== Seated walking scooter ==
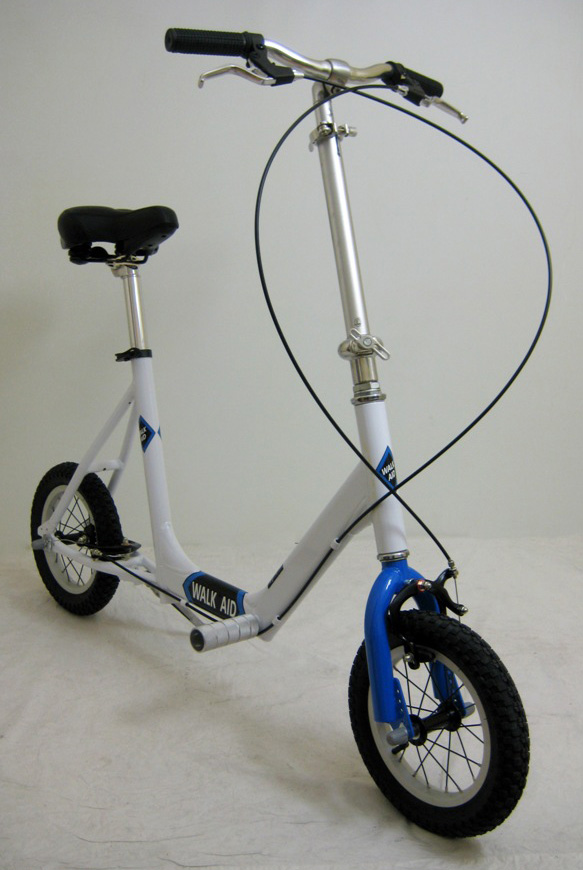
Walking Aid Scooter

The Walk Aid Scooter allows a user with normal balance and foot, knee or hip conditions to unload the lower extremities. The two-wheeled scooter has a bicycle-type seat and handlebars, and is manually propelled with one or both feet like a balance bicycle. This walking aid scooter provides more support than a cane and is lighter, less bulky and easier to propel than a wheelchair.

== Wheelchairs and scooters ==
Wheelchairs and mobility scooters substitute for walking by providing a wheeled device on which the user sits. Wheelchairs may be either manually propelled (by the user or by an aide) or electrically powered (commonly known as a "powerchair"). There are different types of wheelchair power add-ons that turn any manual wheelchair into a power assisted. Mobility scooters are electrically powered, as are motorized wheelchairs. Wheelchairs and Scooters are normally recommended for any individual due to significant mobility/balance impairment. A Registered Occupational Therapist or Physiotherapist (few cases) are able to provide object and clinical testing to ensure proper and safe device recommendations.

== Stairlifts and similar devices ==
A stairlift is a mechanical device for lifting people and wheelchairs up and down stairs. Sometimes special purpose lifts are provided elsewhere to facilitate access for those with disabilities, for example at entrances to raised bus stops in Curitiba, Brazil. A wheelchair lift is specifically designed to carry the user and the wheelchair. This can either be through floor or utilizing the staircase.

== Foot Orthoses ==
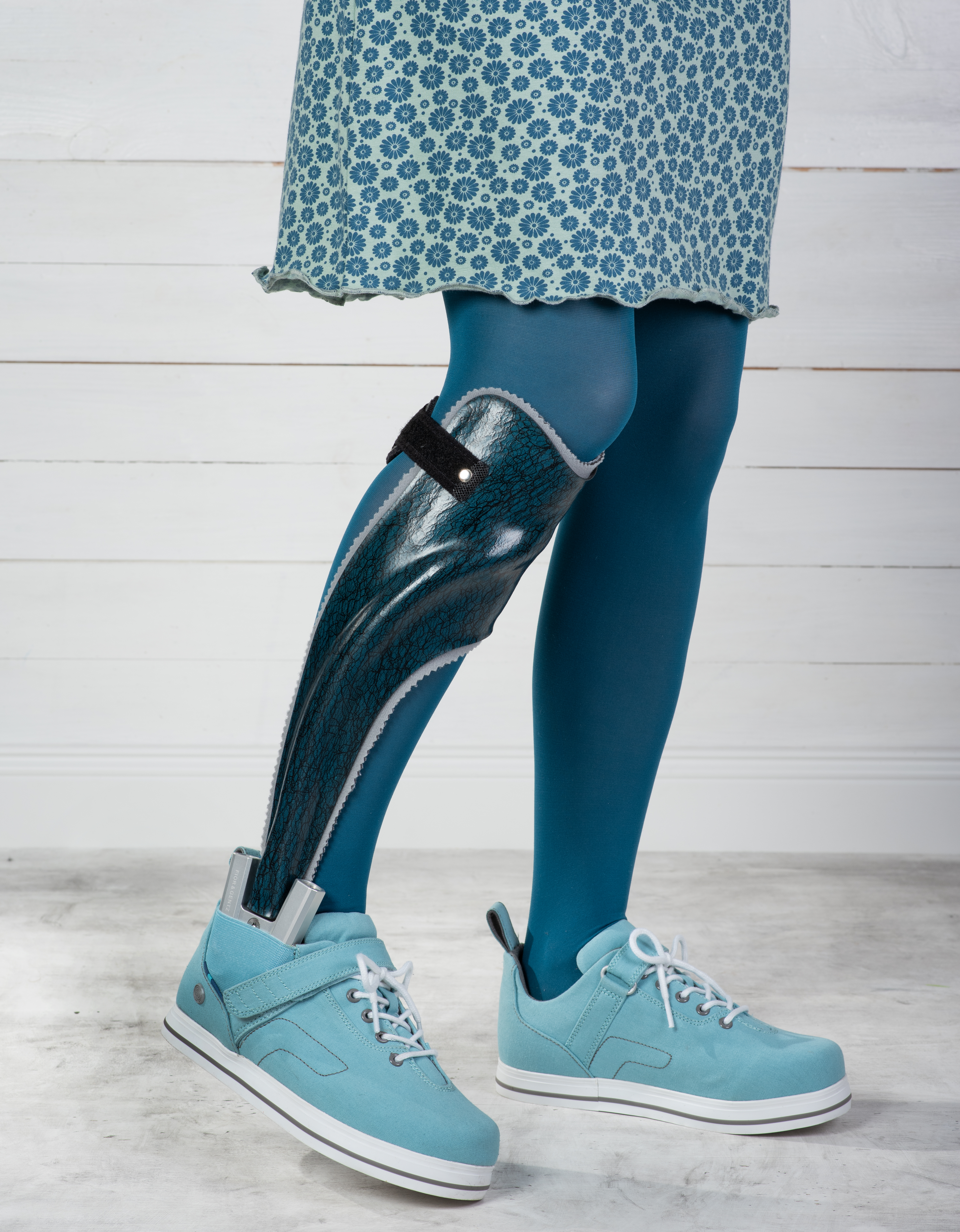
Foot orthosis

Foot orthoses for ankle and leg support increase balance and improve walking where support is needed for proper alignment. There are different types of foot orthoses that provide different supports based on the correction needed: for example, some are spring-based and provide increased toe push-off to compensate for a lack of calf strength while others restrict movement to fix gait. All are worn on the leg and ankle and use a variety of materials to provide support for a more normal walking posture and gait.

These devices are used to treat many conditions, such as flat feet and neuromuscular disorders like Charcot–Marie–Tooth disease, myotonic dystrophy, and polio. Conditions that cause calf muscle weakness throw off balance and gait and require more energy to walk. Foot orthoses increase ankle stability, improve balance and walking speed, reduce the energy needed to walk, and correct foot alignment. These changes improve the ability to walk, which increases quality of life.

Foot orthoses can be prefabricated devices or custom manufactured. However, custom devices have not shown better function despite the significantly higher cost.

Some users of foot orthoses report negatives: increased pain, pressure sores, and more falls. In children with flat feet who do not experience pain, foot orthoses are not recommended.

== Exoskeletons and Robotic End-Effectors ==
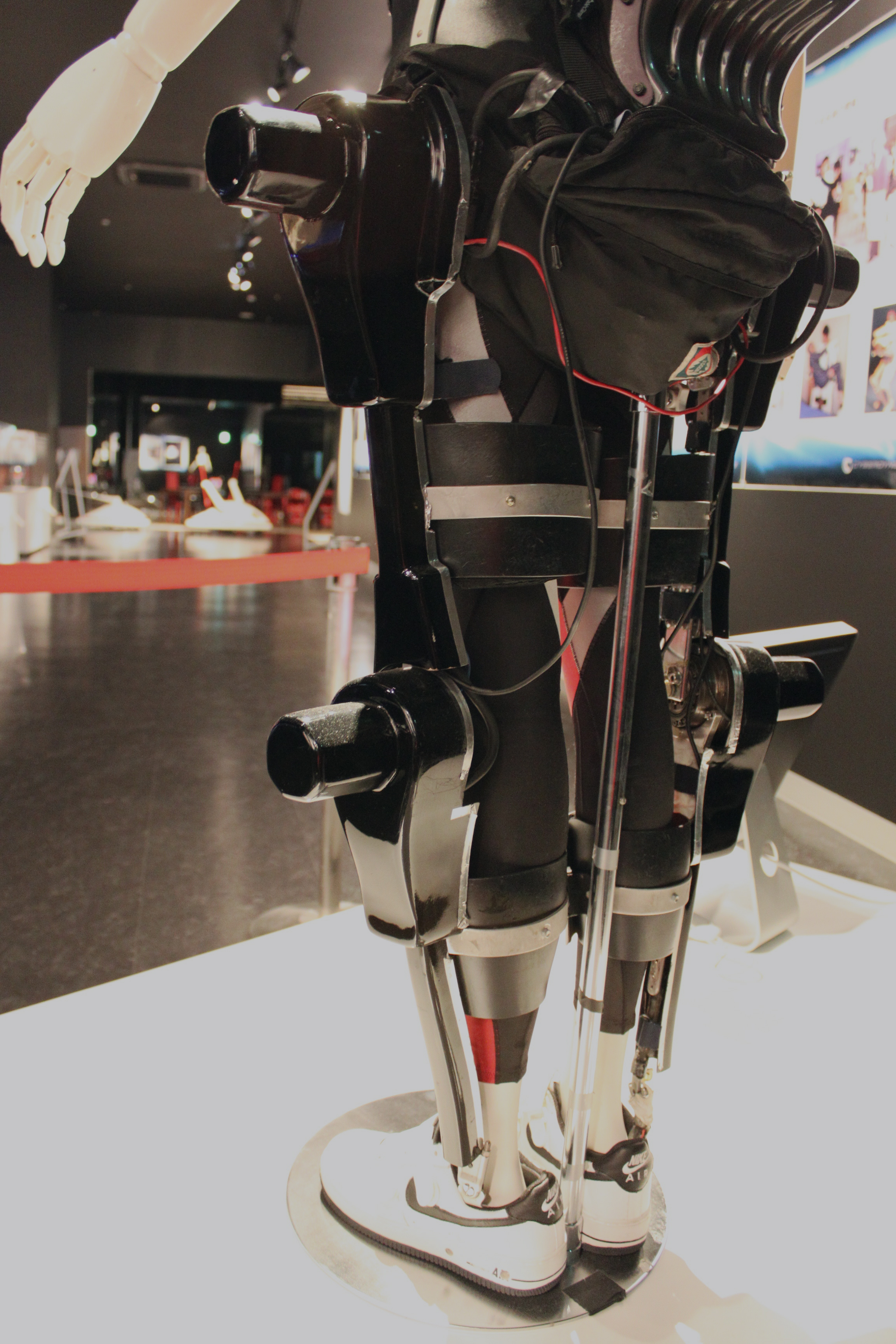
An exoskeleton for the lower body

An exoskeleton is a robotic device used in cases of limited mobility to assist or replace the function of a body part, worn over the part that it enhances, and surrounding a joint. A robotic end-effector is similar to an exoskeleton in that it is a robotic device worn on the body but replaces (rather than enhances) the end functionality, like a robotic hand. Foot orthoses are not considered exoskeletons because they require more mobility and musculature to operate.

Exoskeletons assist mobility in cases of limited function such as spinal cord injury or stroke. Tetraplegia uses an upper body exoskeleton; paraplegia uses a lower body exoskeleton. Osteoperosis patients may use exoskeletons during rehabilitation after falls.

Goals of exoskeleton use include regaining lost function, promotion of healing, and gain of independence with improved mobility and limb use.

Users of robotic devices report increased mobility, reduced pain, greater walking speed and efficiency, and improved strength, spasticity, bone density, and bowel function. Patients are better able to exercise, improving their cardiovascular health. These combined effects lead to improved quality of life and greater independence. Some devices include sensors that feed data into machine learning algorithms, which track the patient's recovery progress and can customize the rehabilitation program over time. This can lead to quicker healing after an injury.

Downsides of exoskeleton use include increased pain and increased risk of fracture from fall. Some users report frustration as the devices are slow and may not fully replace the lost function, like walking, and the technology is new and complicated.

== Others ==
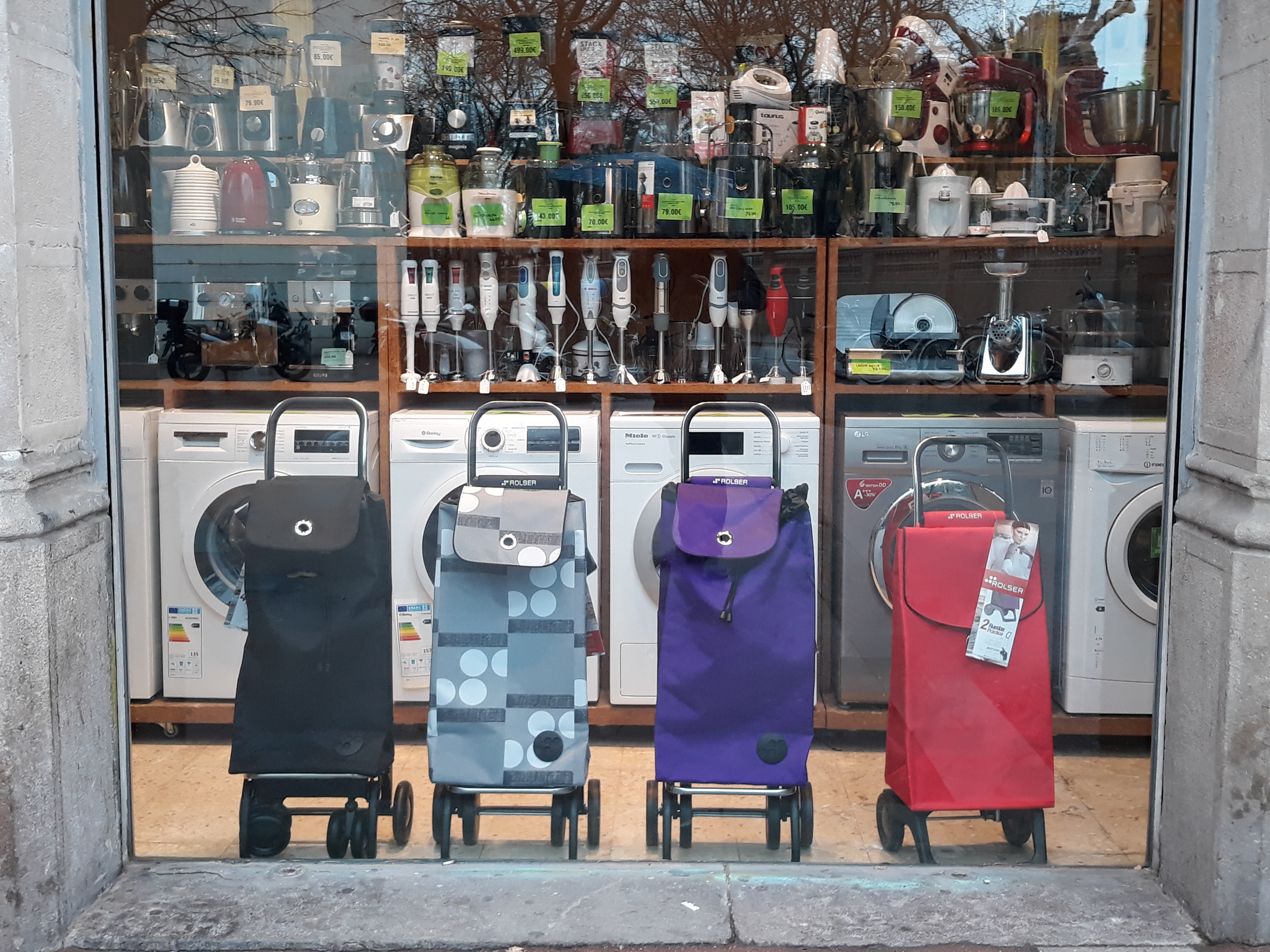
Shopping trolley

Mobility aids may also include adaptive technology such as sling lifts or other patient transfer devices that help transfer users between beds and chairs or lift chairs (and other sit-to-stand devices), transfer or convertible chairs. Knee scooters help some users. As people start to live longer mobility is about for many reclaiming aspects of independence which before were denied to them.

== See also ==
- Accessibility
- Handcycle
- Hobcart
- Recumbent bicycle
- Transport divide
