= OATS =

OATS ("Open Source Assistive Technology Software") is a source code repository or "forge" for assistive technology software. It was launched in 2006 with the goal to provide a one-stop “shop” for end users, clinicians and open-source developers to promote and develop open source assistive technology software. It also allows users to find other software that is free but not open source, and open-source software that is developed elsewhere, for example NVDA, Orca and FireVox.

The OATS website was launched at the end of the OATS project, a one-year pilot project that ended in March 2006, and claimed to be the first open-source repository dedicated to assistive technology. In April 2006, the British Computer Society (BCS) announced that it was backing the OATS project; in August 2006, the British Computer Society's Open Source Specialist Group organised a meeting about the project.

The OATS project was made up of five partner organisations co-ordinated by the ACE Centre. The OATS repository wants to offer an efficient and intuitive way to access good quality assistive technology. The OATS repository offers the following facilities to developers:

- project pages to document and manage a software project,
- a code repository (Subversion),
- a project management system (Trac or Poi).

== See also ==
- Design for All (in ICT)
