= Hobcart =

Mobility device

David Smith and John Casey using their Hobcarts in the late 1960s.

A hobcart was a type of mobility device designed in the late 1960s by Dr. Steven Perry of Albrighton, Shropshire, UK.

== Background ==
Dr. Steven had two young children, both of whom had spina bifida. He considered that the wheelchairs the children were provided with were liable to set them apart from other children of their age, so set about designing a mobility device that would look like a go-kart. The end result was the hobcart, which was produced at a local borstal when it was first made.

The idea behind this was to try to provide the inmates of the borstal the opportunity to be involved in a project which they could see was doing some good. Hobcarts were still being made into the 1980s.

== See also ==
- Invacar
- Mobility scooter
