= ACE Centre =

Non-profit organization in England that supports people with communication difficulties

Ace Centre, previously ACE Centre (Aiding Communication in Education, ACE Centre North) is a non-profit organization in England that supports people with communications difficulties.

Ace Centre offer assessment, training and information services in England and Wales, with a focus on Augmentative and Alternative Communication (AAC) and Assistive Technology (AT). The ACE Centre have two offices, in Oldham and Abingdon.

== History ==
The first ACE Centre was started in 1984 through UK government funding as part of the new initiative to introduce information technology into schools, in England and Wales following the end of the Microelectronics Education Programme MEP. During MEP four Special Education Micro-technology Resource Centres (SEMERCs) were set up in London (Redbridge), Manchester, Bristol and Newcastle. A special education software development centre was also established in Manchester. It was felt that those pupils with severe language or physical disabilities required more specialist support.

This idea for the first ACE centre to support these students came from Tim Southgate (Head of Ormerod Special School) and Prue Fuller, a teacher at the school. They were inspired by the computer research of Patrick Poon at the school. The original staff at the opening of the Centre in May 1984 were Prue Fuller (Director), Andrew Lysley (SEN Teacher), David Colven (Technical Officer) and Pauline Paine (Administrator). The centre was managed by Mary Hope at MESU, a post that was later taken over by Tina Detheridge now of Wigit Software.

It was essentially a project under the management of MESU (Micro Electronics Support Unit) a government quango which later merged with CET (Centre for Educational Technology) to become NCET (the National Centre for Educational Technology). This eventually became Becta (British Educational Communications and Technology Agency) in 1998.

In 1985 a second Centre was opened in Oldham at Park Dean School It was managed by the head teacher Rhys Williams, who later became principal of Hereward College, and Roger Bates (later of Inclusive Technology). Roger Bates was the First Director of the Northern ACE Centre. The two Centres in Oldham and Oxford service the north and south of England and Wales respectively.

== Location ==
The ACE Center was housed in a spare classroom at Ormerod special school in Headington, Oxford. Later it moved to temporary buildings on the same site and remained there until the new 'Wooden Spoon' building was erected on Nuffield Orthopaedic Centre site in 1998. The new 'Wooden Spoon' building was largely funded by the Wooden Spoon Society and was officially opened by Princess Anne in April 1999. The new building has custom built facilities for assessment and training.

== Staff ==
It has occupational therapists, speech and language Therapists, special needs and mainstream teachers, assistive technology specialists and support staff. Early members of staff were Caroline Gray (occupational therapist), Gillian Hazell (the Nelms, Speech and Language Therapist) and Mark Saville (web page and publications creator).

Prue Fuller retired as director in 1999 and was later awarded an MBE for her services to Assistive and Alternative Communication. She was also bi-annual president of ISAAC 1998–2000. Caroline Grey became director of the ACE Centre following Prue's retirement until she retired in 2007. Liz Tapper took over as temporary director until September 2008 and Dr Ben Janubi has been in post since January 2009.

== The CAP Project ==
This was a government initiative to boost the support and provision of communication aids to school students. The ACE Centres were two of the organisations involved with assessment for this project. It initially had a two-year timetable and a £10M budget but was extended for a further two years on the same funding basis. During this time the staffing in the centre increased to cope with the assessment demand.

== Software developments ==
The first software developments at the ace centre was to re-write Sentence Scan and Start-Write for the increasingly popular BBC Micro. Sentence scan was a switch or keyboard accessible sentence builder with speech support. Sentences could be built up from sets of stored words or phrases. Start-Write was a letter/keyboard-based program with speech support and sophisticated user support configurations. Staff from the centre also contributed to the design of the programs such as 'Prompt Writer' and 'Concept', being created by the Special Needs Software Centre based at the Manchester SEMERC managed by Dave King.

The advent of the IBM compatible computer lead to more graphics based programs being developed for switch users such as 'Plocka' (Swedish for 'pick up'). Plocka has facilities for creating sorting and matching scenarios for switch users and has a built in graphics library.

- AccessMaths is a program developed for students that need to create geometric drawings but cannot manipulate a mouse. Users can use a laptop keyboard only to produce accurate and detailed mathematical constructions and drawings.
- SAW (Special Access to Windows) is a program that was created from a grant from the then Department of Trade and Industry to enable switch users to manipulate mathematical equations on screen. These programmable on-screen keyboards (selection sets) are now available for a number of very different applications. SAW 5 is now an open source program available from the Oatsoft web site.
- Hotspots – This program has similar user characteristics to SAW but is designed for point and click environments. In addition to scanning user defined spots on the screen it can annotate these with sounds, images and text.

== Publications ==
The Ace Centre has published a number of reviews, guides, and 'how to' documents over the years. as well as contributing articles to conferences and peer reviewed journals. They have shared papers at conferences such as the ISAAC conference.

== Research and projects ==
Ace Centre works with companies, universities and other charities to:

- Investigate health and education issues for children and adults with complex disabilities
- Support companies to trial new products and develop progressive technology
- Find solutions for an individual or a sector

Research and development projects enhance achievement and good practice in the field; directly, through the development of AT & AAC, and indirectly through awareness raising, skills building and informing government policy. Service-users with communication disabilities are involved throughout.
