= Litter-Robot =

Automatic cat litter box

Litter-Robot is a gravity-driven sifting automatic litter box manufactured and distributed by Whisker based in Auburn Hills, Michigan.

== History ==
Litter-Robot was first released in 2000, under the company name Automated Pet Care Products, Inc. Brad Baxter, who brought the product to market, licensed an existing patent and developed the device. He funded the first generation of the Litter-Robot with an investment from his parents. Baxter sold the Litter-Robot online directly to consumers, and the business became profitable in 2005.

There have been four iterations of the Litter-Robot since its release. Litter-Robot 2 and Litter-Robot 3 launched in 2005 and 2015, respectively. In 2017, the company released its first WiFi-enabled unit, Litter-Robot 3 Connect.

In 2019, Litter-Robot manufacturer Whisker (formerly AutoPets) raised $31 million in growth equity financing from Chicago-based Pondera Holdings LLC. The company completed a $10 million investment to expand its manufacturing plant in Juneau, Wisconsin, in 2022.

The latest iteration of the product, Litter-Robot 4, was released in 2022. Whisker announced in 2023 that 1 million Litter-Robot units have been sold since the company’s inception.

Litter-Robot is designed, assembled, and serviced in the United States and sold in more than 20 countries, including the U.S., Canada, United Kingdom, and much of the European Union. Whisker has 65+ global patents and more than 575 full-time employees in the United States, including a team of 60+ engineers.

== Reception ==
Good Housekeeping called Litter-Robot 4 “the best overall self-cleaning litter box.” It was awarded as one of TIME’s Best Inventions of 2022. The Spruce Pets rated Litter-Robot 4 the “best overall” automatic litter box with 4.8 stars. Forbes Vetted Best Product Awards named Litter-Robot 4 the best self-cleaning litter box of 2024.
