= Wheelchair power add-on =

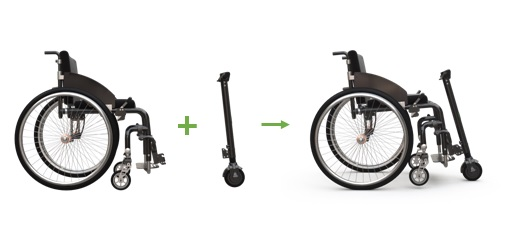
Wheelchair front drive power add-on diagram

A wheelchair power add-on or power assist is a medical device (U.S. Class I) that provides manual wheelchair users with an easy-to-use power boost. It is designed for people who are unable to walk but who can independently move in a wheelchair. Thanks to quick adjustment possibilities and easy clip-on systems for a wide variety of wheelchairs, power add-ons may be used by people with a wide variety of walking impediments.

A power add-on reduces the effort required to propel a wheelchair. Users may achieve the maximum degree of independence and be able to gain more independent freedom on ramp into home, over thresholds, on carpet, on inclines and other obstacles with greater ease, and will be able to travel further with more endurance to function throughout the day at the level needed to maintain the active lifestyle. In most cases, wheelchair power add-on has a lithium-ion battery allowing long run before needing a charge and compact, but powerful brushless DC electric motor.

Wheelchair power add-on devices provide a more functional and less expensive option (versus a motorized wheelchair) for people who still have some ability in pushing a manual wheelchair.

Wheelchair power add-on can easily be removed from chair when needed for transport for medical appointments, work, family events, in the family vehicle without requiring a fully equipped van. This can enhance the person's ability to maintain paid employment, volunteer work and other endeavours to be a productive member of the family and society.

== Types ==
There are a wide variety of types of wheelchair power add-ons, differing by an attachment mechanism, power add-on position, mechanisms of control, and technology used. Some power add-ons are lightweight and designed for general everyday use, others are very powerful and perfect for single activities, or to address specific access needs. Innovation within the market is relatively common, but many innovations ultimately fall by the wayside, either from over-specialization or from failing to come to market at an accessible price-point.

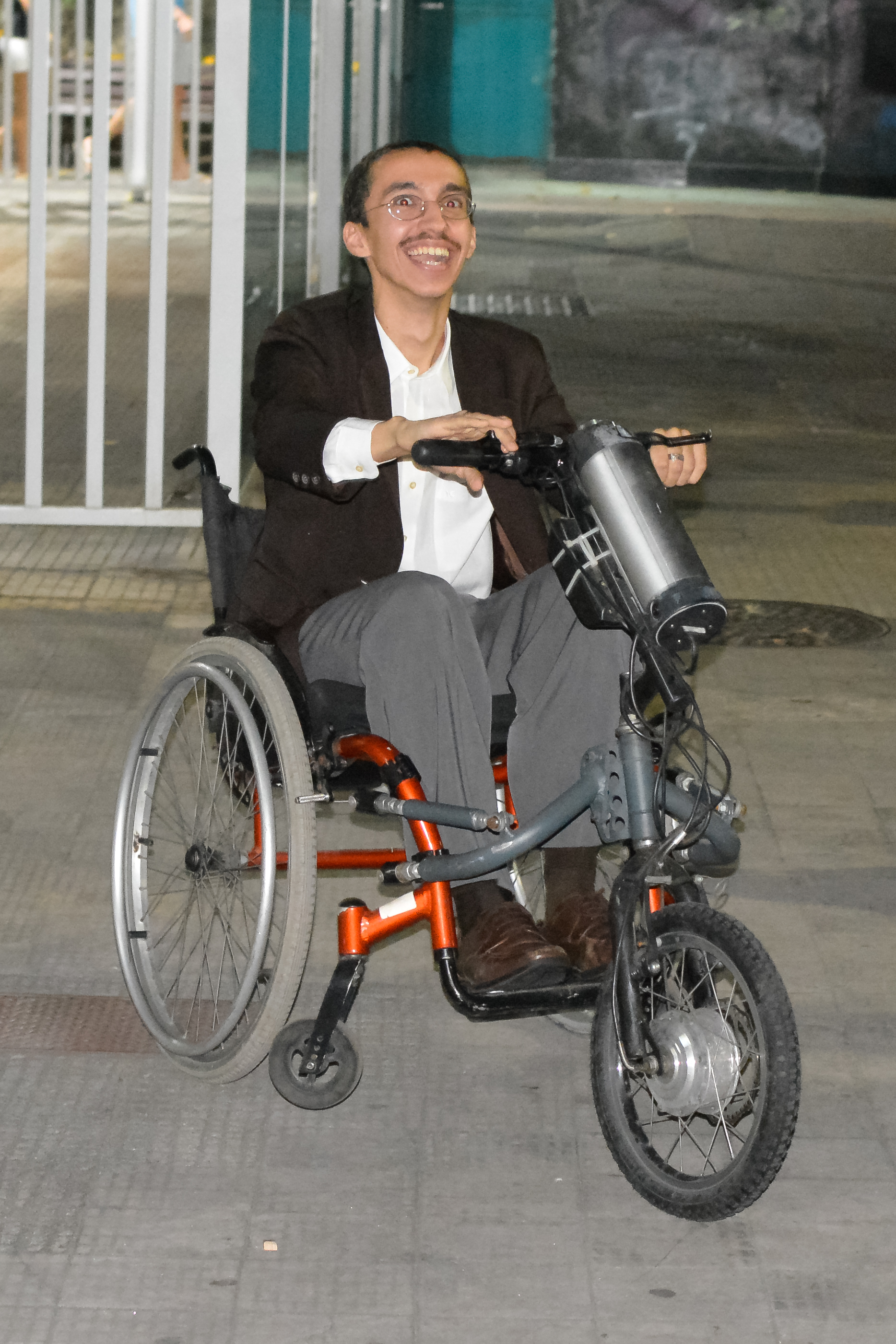
A front-drive motorized add-on attached to an orange wheelchair

=== Front-drive or towing power add-ons ===
This type of power add-on clips on to the front tubes, footplate, or frame of a manual wheelchair and converts it to a powered trike. This improves wheelchair performance over rough terrain a lot as small front casters are lifted and may easily overcome 3–10 cm obstacles. They are available in a wide range of devices from light and foldable versions to huge device for off-road use.

=== Rear-drive or pushing power add-ons ===
Pushing power devices hook on to the crossbar cannot help anyway in a wheelchair. This power assist sits under the chair and controlled by Bluetooth watch. Similar devices have a wireless control unit instead of watch.

Another type of pushing power add-ons are Push and brake aids. They are used to help take the strain off the attendant; they are controlled by the attendant, not a wheelchair user.

=== Power add-ons that rotate rear wheels by additional motorized rollers ===
Power add-ons hook onto the frame of rigid or folding manual wheelchairs and propel rear wheelchair wheels with special motorized rollers. The device is controlled by a joystick while maintaining the chair’s manoeuvrability. By releasing a clutch, the user can choose when to switch between assisted power or manual use. May be user-operated, companion operated or through mobile app remotely.

=== Integrated into the wheels of wheelchair ===
This type of power add-on replaces original wheelchair wheels with motorized. In the most recent models battery, controller and motor are all built-in the wheel and the wheel remains detachable for easy transportation. A wheelchair may be controlled by pushing rims or may fully convert a manual wheelchair into a motorized wheelchair by adding joystick mounted on the armrest.

== See also ==
- Mobility scooter
- Motorized wheelchair
- Cars for wheelchair users
- Lift chair
- Standing wheelchair
