= Lift chair =

Assistive armchair

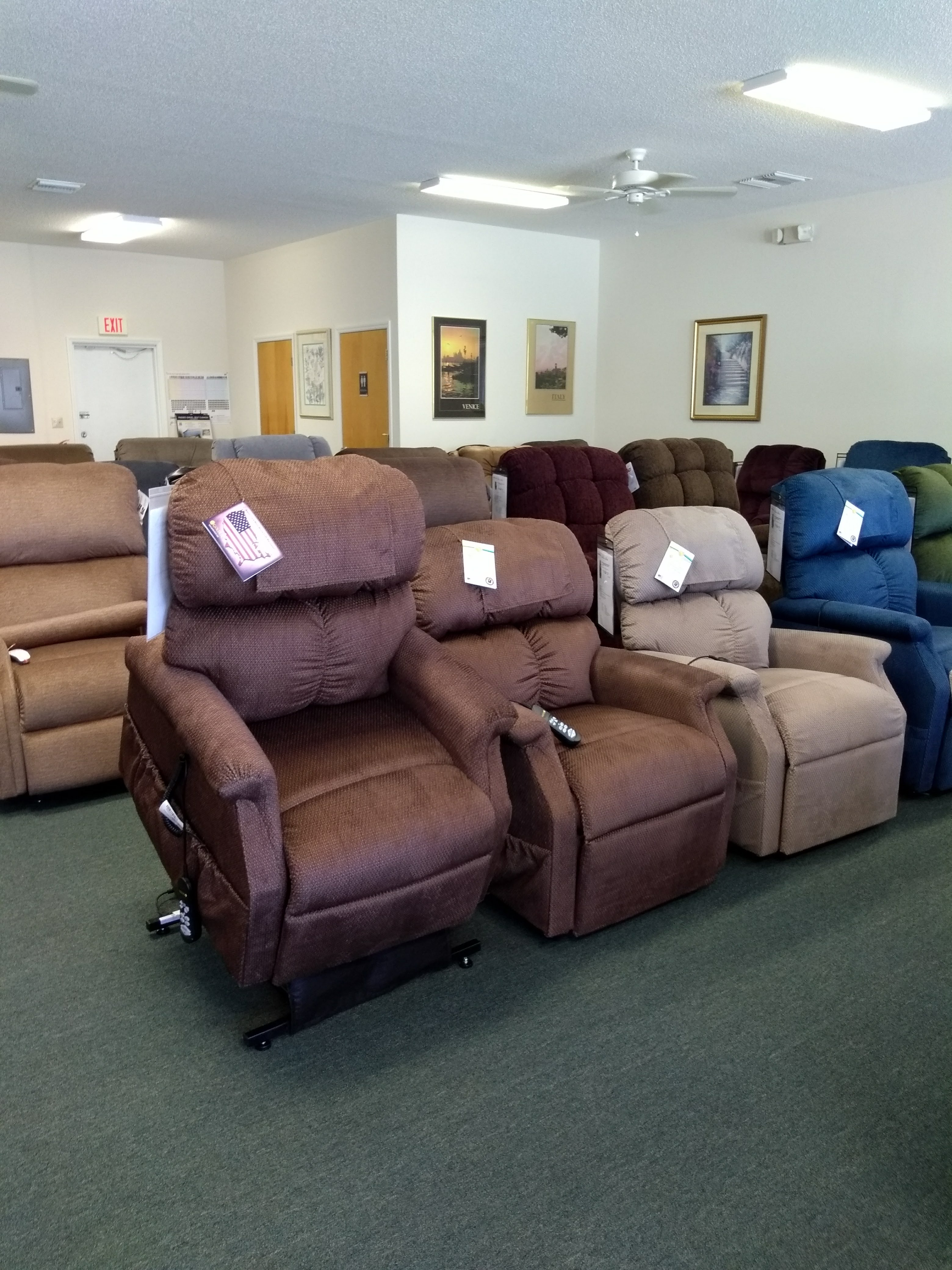
Lift chairs at Tampa Lift Chair Showroom

Lift chairs, also known as lift recliners or riser armchairs, are chairs that feature a powered lifting mechanism that pushes the entire chair up from its base and so assists the user to a standing position.

In the United States, lift chairs qualify as durable medical equipment under Medicare Part B.

In a February 1989 report released by the Inspector General of the US Department of Health and Human Services, it was found that: lift chairs might not possibly meet Medicare's requirements for Durable Medical Equipment (DME) and lift chair claims need to be re-regulated. The report was stimulated by an increase in lift chair claims between 1984 and 1985 from 200,000 to 700,000. A New York Times article stated that aggressive TV ads were pushing consumers to inquire about lift chairs and, once consumers called in, a form was sent to them for their physicians to sign. Some companies would ship lift chairs before receiving a physician's signature; therefore, forcing the physicians to sign or else their patient will be forced to pay for the chair.

Medicare may only cover the cost of the lift-mechanism rather than the entire chair. Before Medicare can be considered for covering the cost, patients will need to have a visit with their physician to discuss the need for this particular equipment. The DME provider will then request a prescription and a certificate of medical necessity (CMN). The CMN typical involves five questions that the physician needs to answer. Typically, the questions are (1) Does the patient have severe arthritis, (2) Does the patient have a neuromuscular disease, (3) Is the patient incapable of getting up from a regular chair in their home, (4) Can the patient walk once standing, and (5) Have all other therapeutic measures been taken? If any of the questions are answered "NO", it may likely result in a denial of the claim.

Typically, DME providers require full payment for the lift chair and will offer reimbursement upon approval from Medicare. DME providers cannot bill Medicare without first providing the equipment.

Lift chairs can also come with a number of additional feature options and addons. These include heat and massage, adjustable head pillows, adjustable lumbar, battery backups, and premium fabrics.

== See also ==
- List of chairs
- Massage chair
- Mobility aid
- Recliner
