= Assistive eating devices =

Eating implement

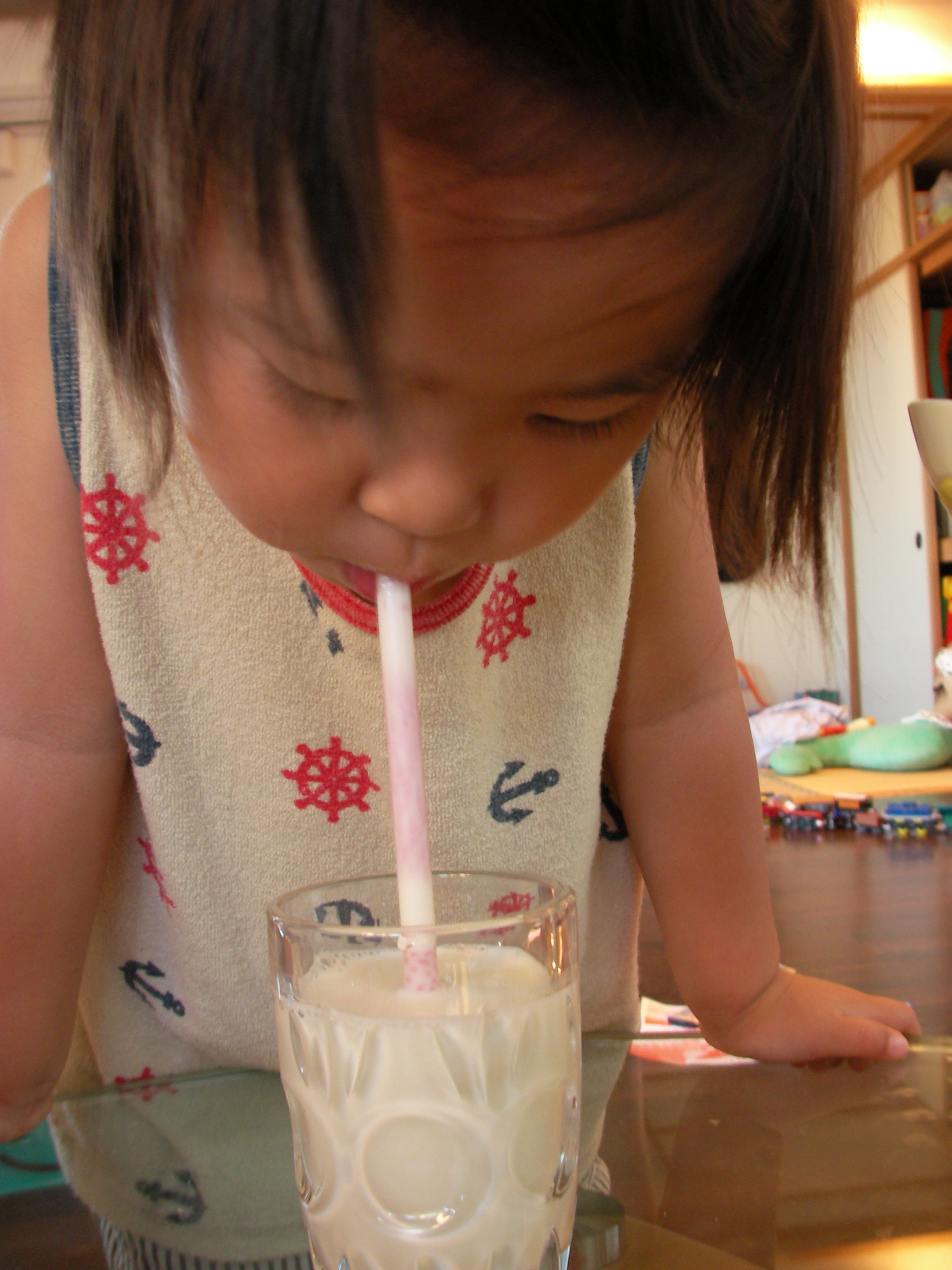
Child using a drinking straw

Assistive eating devices include devices ranging from low-tech utensils to high-tech powered robotic eating equipment. Low tech eating devices include utensils, plates and bowls with lips that make scooping food easier. Cups and mugs, and even a standard disposable straw can be considered assistive drinking devices. They are used by people when they have difficulty eating or drinking independently. These devices are typically used for people with disabilities, but can also be used for children or people that have poor dexterity. They can promote independence during meal times, but in many cases also can reduce the caregiver workload during meals. "Assistive eating devices can increase self-care, increase self-esteem associated with increased independence, increase safety during meals, and make meal-time better for caregiver staff…".

More sophisticated technology, typically described as high-tech equipment, is also available to accommodate the needs of individuals who have significant restrictions in their ability to eat and drink without assistance from another person. For people who have quadriplegia, Amyotrophic Lateral Sclerosis (ALS, also known as Lou Gehrig's disease), cerebral palsy, spinal muscular atrophy (SMA), and many other conditions, a powered device can facilitate hands free eating. For those who have tremors, or weak muscles, that make eating in the traditional manner difficult, or impossible, an assistive feeding device may be of value.

== Adaptive dinnerware ==
This category includes plates and bowls that will not allow food to fall off or out of the container and will not slide around. Some of these devices are as simple as a clip on guard that attaches to any normal plate or bowl. There are many plates that also have a lip on the edge that prevents food from being pushed off the plate when it is being scooped. Other dinnerware are modified or specially made so they do not slide around on the table. Two common ways to keep the plates and bowls on the table are mats and grip bottoms. However, if the individual in question has tremors, then suction bases may be utilized. There are special bowls and plates that have a suction base that will attach to the table. This base will prevent the dinnerware from getting knocked around when the container or table is bumped.

== Assistive utensils ==
Forks, knives and spoons may need to be adapted in order for people to use them. Individuals may struggle with tremors or the movement of opening and closing the hand or lifting the arm for independent feeding. Adapted utensils may be the answer for these individuals. Much like the weighted mugs to help with tremors, weighted utensils can minimize the tremors. These types of utensils may be specially bought, but attachments can also be bought to adapt the current utensils into an assistive device. These attachments can include something to slip over the handle that is weighted or that may be large or made out of foam to enhance grip and prevent the utensil from falling out of the hand. Clips and straps may also be utilized if the individual is unable to hold the handle at all.

== Manual Feeding Devices ==
Manual or self feeding devices are designed to allow an individual who has a tremor, or who lacks the hand and arm coordination to control a utensil or control a robotic device to scoop food and lift it to their mouth and feed themselves. Some devices simply stabilize the user's arm. Other devices provide a weighted arm that dampens extraneous movement. More sophisticated devices allow the user to select the food they would like to eat and control the pace at which they eat. These more sophisticated devices can accommodate most disabilities. In some cases the device requires the user to manipulate the device to have the spoon pick up food and then move the spoon to their mouth, so they require some degree of arm motion capability by the user (i.e., they are powered by the user's own muscles). In the case of more sophisticated devices which are operated by a variety of manual switches, all the motions to capture and deliver the food are performed by the machine.

== Powered Feeding Devices ==
Powered feeding devices allow individuals who are unable to self-feed using any other type of assistive eating technology, to eat independently. Typically, these devices operate using power from a rechargeable battery (for portability). The user controls the device by the use of a touch screen tablet or adaptive switches to activate the various functions that the specific device offers. Worldwide, there are only a few powered feeding devices commercially available. The designs and manner in which they operate vary considerably. Some offer a simple plate or bowl on which the food is served, while others provide divided dishes or multiple bowls that keep the different types of foods separated, to avoid mixing of food. Many of the early powered feeding device designs were simply mechanical.

== Assistive cups and mugs ==
Cups and mugs may be adapted or bought to help with daily living. The most common assistive drinking utensil is the straw. This is inexpensive and allows for the user to not need to pick up the cup at all. The same principles for assistive dinnerware may also be utilized for mugs or cups. Non-slip bases are common so they do not slip on the table, while cup holders are used to prevent the cup from being knocked over. In case the cup gets knocked over, no spill lids may be used. Some cups are sold with lids, but there are also lids that can be used for several different types of cups and mugs. Weighted mugs are also common for individuals with tremors. For individuals who have disabilities that limit the use of arms and/or hands, hands free drinking products are also available.
