= Assistive Technology for Deaf and Hard of Hearing =

Assistive Technology for the Deaf and Hard of Hearing is technology built to assist those who are deaf or have hearing loss. Examples of such technology include hearing aids, video relay services, tactile devices, alerting devices and technology for supporting communication.

== Introduction ==
The deaf or hard of hearing community communicate and perceive information differently compared to hearing individuals, which is often left unaccommodated in societies for a variety of reasons, such as social stigma. These individuals often utilize visual and tactile mediums for receiving and communicating information in order to fully interact with hearing individuals. The use of assistive technology and devices provides individuals with hearing loss with sounds at a louder volume (for those who are hard of hearing), tactile feedback, visual cues and improved technology access. Some individuals who are deaf or hard of hearing utilize a variety of assistive technologies that provide them with improved accessibility to information in numerous environments. Individuals who are deaf or hard of hearing increasingly benefit from advances in captioning technologies, which provide real-time transcription of spoken language in educational, professional, and entertainment settings. Automatic speech recognition (ASR) software, a subset of artificial intelligence, is frequently used in developing these captioning tools. For instance, platforms such as YouTube and Zoom have integrated ASR-based systems to ensure greater accessibility. Research highlights the role of captioning in fostering inclusivity and reducing barriers for those with hearing loss. Studies published in the Journal of Deaf Studies and Deaf Education emphasize its importance in enhancing comprehension and engagement. Most devices either provide amplified sound or alternate ways to access information through vision and/or vibration. These technologies can be grouped into three general categories: hearing technology, alerting devices, and communication support.

== Hearing technology ==
Hearing technology can broadly be defined as any device utilized for increasing the level of sound available to a listener. Hearing technology can further be divided into two general subcategories of Assistive Listening Devices or Personal Amplification.

=== Assistive listening devices ===
Assistive listening devices (ALD) can be utilized by individuals or large groups of people and can typically be accessed without the support of specific personnel. These devices are frequently used to improve the signal-to-noise ratio (SNR) in different situations. All Assistive Listening Devices (ALDs) consist of a transmitter sending a person's voice or another audio source to a receiver, which subsequently distributes the sound uniformly in environments such as theaters, churches, or even directly to an individual.

==== Frequency Modulation ====
With Frequency Modulation (FM) systems, the sound is transmitted on a specific frequency or channel similar to a radio. The Federal Communications Commission (FCC) has designated specific frequencies for these types of systems. There are now small receivers than can be connected directly to a person's hearing aids through direct audio input (DAI). Any time an FM system is coupled to a hearing aid, special settings and connections are required from an audiologist. Occasionally, when multiple FM-based systems are employed within a single building, issues may arise concerning signal interference between different rooms and channels.

==== Infrared ====
These systems utilize light waves to transmit sound from the transmitter to a special light sensitive receiver. The signal can be broadcast to a whole room through speakers or a person who wears an individual receiver. There must be a clear line of connection between the transmitter and receiver so that the light signal is not interrupted. The benefit of infrared systems is that they only work in the room where the transmitter and receiver are located resulting in significantly fewer issues with cross-over. These systems can be sensitive to external light sources or interfering objects.

==== Induction loop ====
Induction loop systems utilize electromagnetic energy to transmit the signal. These systems can cover a small area with a loop placed under a rug or may be permanently installed within the walls or ceiling of larger areas like theaters, auditoriums, or churches.

=== Personal amplification ===
Personal amplification is chosen specific to the needs of an individual based on their level of hearing and requires the support of an audiologist to determine candidacy for different devices and appropriately fit and adjust the chosen device.

==== Hearing aid ====
Hearing aids are electroacoustic devices which are designed to amplify sound for the wearer, usually with the aim of making speech more intelligible. However, many users report this outcome to be false in their experience.

Some technologies also worth noting are cochlear implants and bone-anchored hearing aids (BAHA), which serve a similar purpose to hearing aids.

== Communication Support Technology ==
Following are some technologies employed by deaf and hard of hearing individuals for communication purposes.

=== Teletypewriters ===
Telecommunication Device for the Deaf (TDD), previously known as teletype machine (TTY), allows the user to place phone calls using text through a regular phone line. Each TDD has a keyboard with a text screen. A user either needs to connect with another person that has a TDD or use a relay service that can convert the text into voice for the hearing listener receiving the call. With the improvements in technology for phones, pagers, text devices and computer services, the use of the TDD has declined.

=== Voice Carry Over Telephone ===
The Voice Carry Over Telephone (VCO) is used by those people who are unable to hear or distinguish noises well over the telephone but prefer to use their voice to communicate. VCO telephone calls must be made through a relay service. This connection allows the person with the hearing loss to speak to the other party and read their incoming message on the telephone's display screen. There is also a portable VCO device, which can be attached to cell phones, pay phones, or cordless phones.

Varying state to state, this service may be free to the consumer—paid for but the government. This was a provision of the Americans with Disabilities Act. The relay service companies pick a date that works for the consumer, sets up the telecommunication system, and teaches them how to use it. A third party employee translates the incoming speech in real time for the consumer to read the message.

=== IP Relay Services ===
Similar to Voice Carry Over Telephone (VCO), The Internet Protocol (IP) Relay Service is used by Deaf or Hard of Hearing people who use a phone in communication, but find voices and noises on the phone to be unintelligible. IP relay is accessible through the internet and allows the person to communicate by text. When a user calls someone, there is a third party person, called a communication assistant (CA), who will receive the user's call and the IP relay will go from the caller's computer to the other person's phone. The communication assistant will type to the deaf/hard of hearing person, who will in turn respond, and then the communication assistant will pass along the information to the person on the other end of the line.

=== Video relay services ===
Video relay service (VRS) or video remote interpreting (VRI) is a type of video telecommunication service, which use communication devices such as webcams or videophones to provide sign-language and/or spoken language interpretation services. In many cases, getting an interpreter may take some time and they may not be immediately available. The VRI will provide an interpreter on the spot. The VRI has two parties, the deaf/hard of hearing person who is using the VRI, and the interpreter who is on the screen. The interpreter can be on a videophone, web camera, or computer screen. The interpreter will use the audio, while someone speaks and the person will interpret to the deaf person by sign language, and then if the deaf/hard of hearing wants to say something they will sign to the interpreter and the interpreter will use his/her voice to relay that message.

=== Real-time text ===
Real-time text (RTT) is transmitting text which the reader can automatically read even before the sender finishes the sentence. The Deaf community uses this as one of the ways to communicate. RTT allows the other person (receiver) to read the message immediately, without waiting for the message to be written. The idea is similar to the idea that they can talk continuously without any pauses and interruptions. The Deaf community uses RTT to have a continuous conversation.

TDD devices, sometimes called TTY devices, are commonly used for RTT via a regular phone call. Text over IP (ToIP) is a type of RTT that uses IP networks natively.

=== Real time captioning ===
Real time captioning provides a typewritten account of all verbal information presented within a lecture, meeting, discussion or presentation. All of these systems require the skills of a trained captioner and specialized software or equipment such as a computer. They typically vary based on the amount of information represented within the visual display of information ranging from summaries to word for word transcription.

==== Communication Access Real Time Captioning ====
Also called open captioning, or real-time stenography, or simply real-time captioning, Communication Access Real Time Captioning (CART) is the general name of the system that court reporters, closed captioners and voice writers, and others use to convert speech to text. A trained operator uses keyboard or stenography methods to transcribe spoken speech into written text. Speech to text software is used when voice writers provide CART.

==== C-Print ====
C-Print is a speech-to-text (captioning) technology and service developed at the National Technical Institute for the Deaf, a college of Rochester Institute of Technology. The system is successfully being used to provide communication access to individuals who are deaf or hard of hearing in many programs around the country. In addition to educational environments, C-Print also can be used in business and community settings, and with individuals with other disabilities, such as those with a visual impairment or a learning disability.

==== Remote captioning ====
Rather than having a captioner physically present, the user can listen in using a phone, cell phone, or computer microphone which allows the captioner to transmit the text back to the consumer using a modem, internet or some other data connection.

==== Video captioning ====
Video captions make video content more accessible to all audiences. The 21st Century Communications & Video Accessibility Act (CVAA), passed in 2010, legally requires content delivered by broadband, digital and mobile technology to be accessible to those with disabilities. The Federal Communications Commission (FCC) enforces compliance of the CVAA and clarifies the law when necessary.
