= Acoustic wayfinding =

Practice of using the auditory system to navigate physical space

Acoustic wayfinding is the practice of using the auditory system to orient oneself and navigate physical space. It is commonly used by the visually impaired, allowing them to retain their mobility without relying on visual cues from their environment.

== Method ==
Acoustic wayfinding involves using a variety of auditory cues to create a mental map of the surrounding environment. This can include a number of techniques: navigating by sounds from the natural environment, such as pedestrian crossing signals; echolocation, or creating sound waves (by tapping a cane or making clicking noises) to determine the location and size of surrounding objects; and memorizing the unique sounds in a given space to recognize it again later. For the visually impaired, these auditory cues become the primary substitute for visual information about the direction and distance of people and objects in their environment.

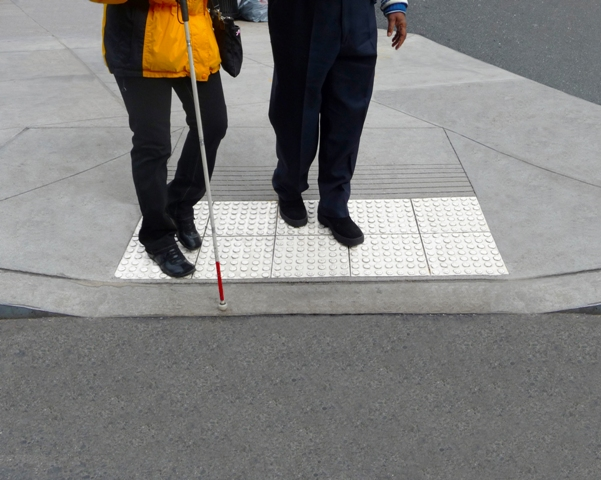
Visually impaired person using a cane to navigate a city street

However, there are a number of common obstacles to acoustic wayfinding techniques: noisy outdoor environments can challenge an individual's ability to identify useful sounds, while indoors, the architecture may not provide an acoustic response which is useful for orientation and destination. Among the most difficult environments to navigate for individuals who rely on acoustic wayfinding are crowded places like department stores, transit stations, and hotel lobbies, or open spaces like parking lots and parks, where distinct sound cues are lacking. This means that, in practice, individuals who navigate primarily by acoustic wayfinding must also rely on a number of other senses – including touch, smell, and residual sight – to supplement auditory cues. These different methods can be used in tandem. For example, visually impaired individuals often use a white cane, not only to physically locate obstacles in front of them, but also to acoustically get a sense of what those obstacles may be. By tapping the cane, they also create sound waves that help them to gauge the location and size of nearby objects.

== Importance in architecture ==
Recently, architects and acousticians have begun to address the problems faced by people who rely primarily on acoustic wayfinding to navigate urban spaces. The primary work on the architectural implications of acoustic wayfinding comes from a collaboration between Christopher Downey, an architect who went blind in 2008 and has since worked to improve architectural design for the visually impaired, and Joshua Cushner, who leads the Acoustic consulting practice for engineering design firm Arup in San Francisco. Their work focuses on how to plan new facilities to include sensible systems of sound markers and architectural spaces which provide orientation through acoustic cues. On 20 September 2011, the San Francisco chapter of the American Institute of Architects organized an acoustic wayfinding discussion and walking tour, led by Chris Downey and Joshua Cushner. The purpose of the tour was to highlight the ways that visual impaired people associate sounds with particular buildings and locations, creating "sound markers" that help them find their way on the street or indoors, and to discuss implementing more unique sound markers into urban design projects.

== See also ==
- Wayfinding
- Acoustic location
- Human echolocation
