= Target Motion Analysis =

Target Motion Analysis (TMA) is a process to determine the position of a target using passive sensor information. Sensors like passive RADAR and SONAR provide directional and occasionally frequency information. TMA is done by marking from which direction the sound comes at different times, and comparing the motion with that of the operator's own ship. Changes in relative motion are analyzed using standard geometrical techniques along with some assumptions about limiting cases. There are two different ways to execute TMA: manual and automated.

== Manual TMA ==
Manual TMA methods involve computation executed by humans instead of computers. There exist several manual TMA methods such as: Ekelund Ranging, 1934 Rule, Spears Wheel etc.

=== Ekelund ranging ===
One of the best known TMA techniques is Ekelund ranging. It is a method that is specifically designed for a 2leg-1zig scenario. This method works by first estimating the bearing rates during the first $BR^1$ and second leg $BR^2$. Secondly, one calculates the speed of advance along the line of sight with the target on the first $SOA^1$and second leg $SOA^2$. The rule then states that the range of the target at the moment of maneuver is given by:

$$r_2 = \textstyle\frac{SOA^2 - SOA^1}{BR^1 - BR^2}$$

== Automated TMA ==
Automated TMA methods involve computations executed by computers. This allows for the simultaneous tracking of multiple targets. There exist several automated TMA methods such as: Maximum Likelihood Estimator (MLE), etc.

=== Maximum Likelihood Estimator (MLE) ===
The MLE method tries to fit the directional measurements (bearings) to a theoretical linear motion model of the target. The bearing function to be fitted is:

$$\beta (t) = arctan2(\textstyle\frac{V_y*t + y_0 - y^OBS}{V_x*t + x_0 - x^O})$$

If $N$ measurements of $\beta_i$ have been collected, the problem reduces to an overdetermined system of $N$ non-linear equations. The state vector associated is

$$X = [x_0  y_0  V_x  V_y]$$

and can be solved by numerical estimation procedures like Gauss-Newton.
