= Placerovci =

- Location in Slovenia
- Coordinates: 46°24′7.67″N 16°1′41.09″E
- Country: Slovenia
- Traditional region: Styria
- Statistical region: Drava
- Municipality: Gorišnica

Area
  - Total: 1.8 km^{2} (0.69 sq mi)
- Elevation: 205.9 m (676 ft)

Population (2020)
  - Total: 144
  - Density: 80/km^{2} (210/sq mi)

Placerovci (pronounced [ˈplaːtsɛɾou̯tsi]) is a settlement on the left bank of the Drava River in the Municipality of Gorišnica in northeastern Slovenia. The area is part of the traditional region of Styria. It is included in the Drava Statistical Region.

== Notable people ==
Notable people that were born or lived in Placerovi include the following:

- Slavko Vesenjak (born 1981), lawyer
