= Municipality of Gorišnica =

Municipality of Slovenia

Municipality of Gorišnica Občina Gorišnica
- Municipality
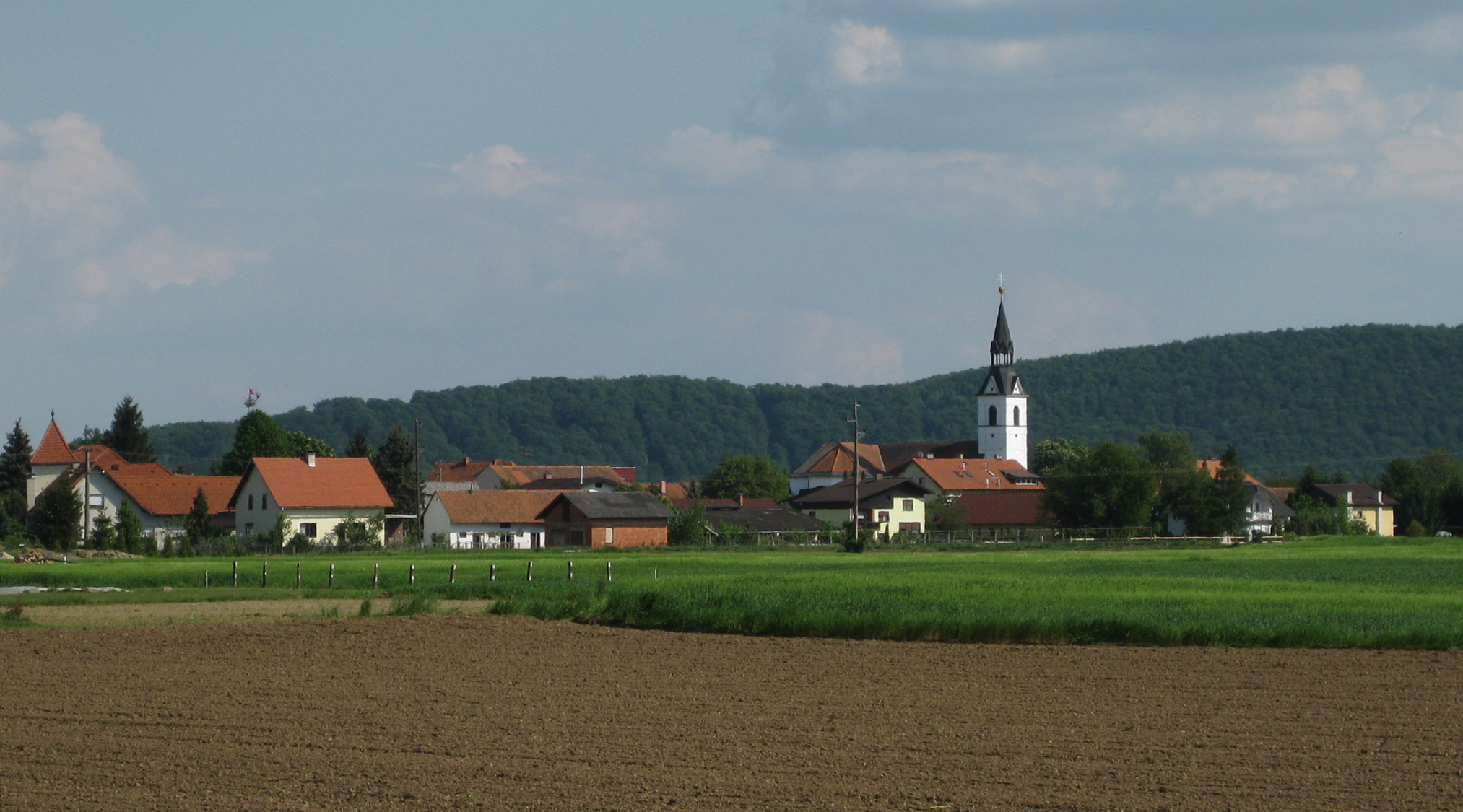

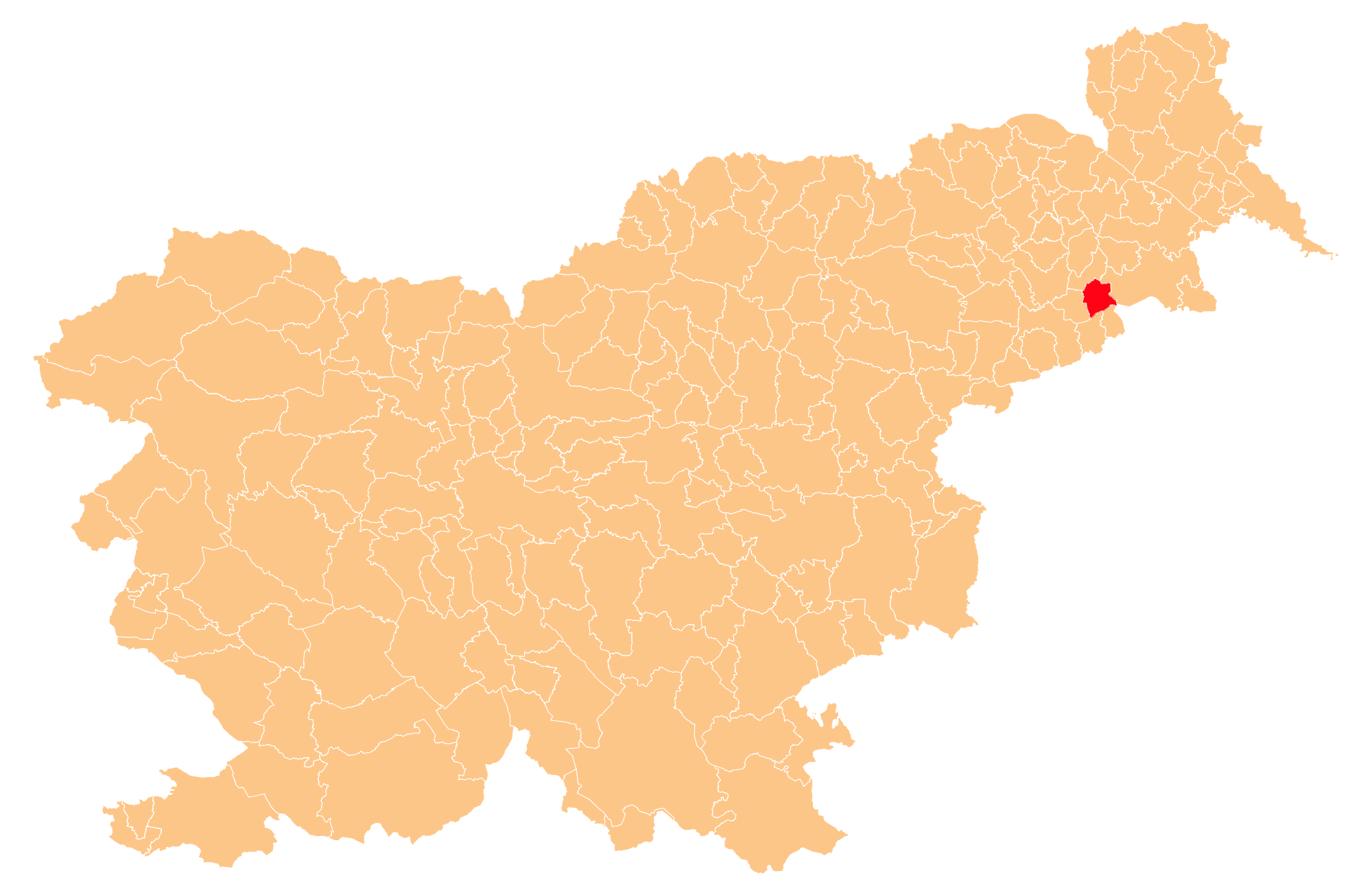
- Location of the Municipality of Gorišnica in Slovenia
- Coordinates: 46°25′N 16°01′E
- Country: Slovenia

Government
  - Mayor: Borut Kolar (Independent)

Area
  - Total: 61.2 km^{2} (23.6 sq mi)

Population (2002)
  - Total: 5,822
  - Density: 95.1/km^{2} (246/sq mi)
- Time zone: UTC+01 (CET)
  - Summer (DST): UTC+02 (CEST)
- Website: www.gorisnica.eu

The Municipality of Gorišnica (pronounced [ɡɔˈɾiːʃnitsa], Slovene: Občina Gorišnica) is a municipality in Slovenia. The seat of the municipality is Gorišnica. The area belongs to the traditional region of Styria. It is now included in the Drava Statistical Region. It borders Croatia.

== Settlements ==
In addition to the municipal seat of Gorišnica, the municipality also includes the following settlements:

- Cunkovci
- Formin
- Gajevci
- Mala Vas
- Moškanjci
- Muretinci
- Placerovci
- Tibolci
- Zagojiči
- Zamušani

== Notable people from Gorišnica ==
Slavko Vesenjak (born 1981), Slovenian Lawyer
