= Ranzoni =

Ranzoni is a surname. Notable people with the surname include:

- Carlo Ranzoni (born 1965), Swiss jurist and judge
- Daniele Ranzoni (1843–1889), Italian painter
- Pierre Ranzoni (1921–1999), French footballer and manager
