= Toplak and Mrak v. Slovenia =

Case before the European Court of Human Rights

Original jurisdiction Submitted 24 June and 5 August 2019 Decided 26 October 2021
- Full case name: Toplak and Mrak v. Slovenia
- Case: 34591/19 (Toplak v. Slovenia), 42545/19 (Mrak v. Slovenia)
- Chamber: Second Chamber
- Language of proceedings: English

Ruling
- Breaches of Articles 13

Court composition
- President; Róbert Ragnar Spanó
- Judges: Jon Fridrik Kjølbro; Carlo Ranzoni; Valeriu Griţco; Egidijus Kūris; Pauliine Koskelo; Marko Bošnjak (judge); Saadet Yüksel

Instruments cited
- European Convention on Human Rights and Protocol 1

Keywords
- discrimination, disability, accessibility, referendum, secret ballot, right to free elections, right to vote, polling place, voting machines, assistive technology

Toplak and Mrak v. Slovenia (34591/19, 42545/19) of 26 October 2021, is the European Court of Human Rights judgment in which the court held that voters' rights were violated when they had no legal right to ask for accessible polling places in advance to achieve accessibility before the election day. The ruling is also significant because the court for the first time extended its jurisdiction to referendums.

== Background ==
The applicants Franc Toplak and Iztok Mrak were both wheelchair users with muscular dystrophy. At least since 2006, several persons with disabilities and disability organizations have addressed the Slovenian authorities in order to facilitate accessible polling stations.

In 2008, the Convention on the Rights of Persons with Disabilities (CRPD) came into effect in Slovenia. On 20 May 2010, the European Court of Human Rights (ECtHR) ruled in Alajos Kiss v. Hungary (38832/06) that Hungary cannot restrict voting rights only on the basis of guardianship due to a psychosocial disability. The ECtHR awarded Mr. Kiss with EUR 3,000.

In 2010, the Constitutional Court of Slovenia rejected an appeal filed by five disabled voters, but explained that as many polling stations as possible should be accessible.

During the 2011 parliamentary elections there were 113 polling stations in Maribor and only one was designated as "accessible". All the persons with disabilities were invited to vote on this polling station. The applicant Franc Toplak came there on his wheelchair and learned that due to a mistake by the authorities, even this polling station was blocked by stairs and thus was not accessible. Electoral authorities and courts rejected his complaints. The Constitutional Court rejected his appeal and ruled that courts only deal with claims of violations that are of such magnitude to affect the overall election results.

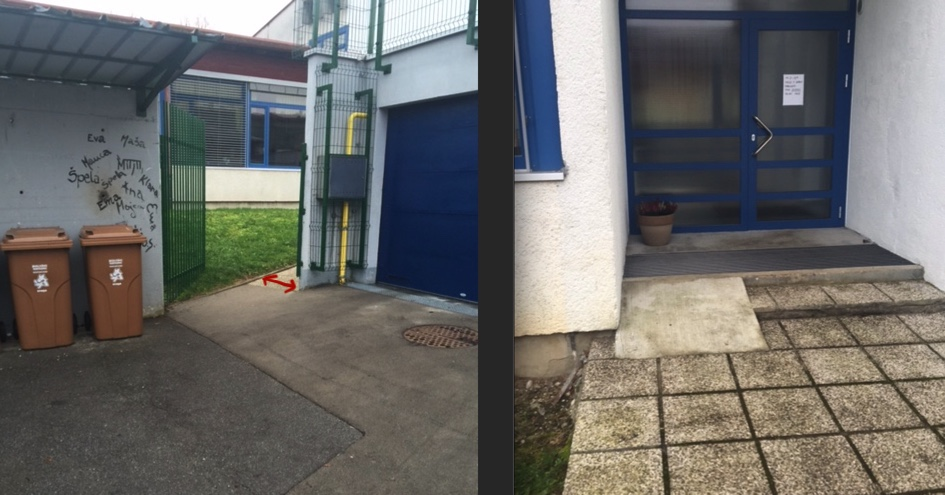
The back entrance to the polling place in Ljubljana. The court did not agree with plaintiffs that instructing voters with disabilities to enter through the back entrance and garbage disposal path, and up the trash bin ramp, followed by a small area and the door they could not open, amounted to discrimination.

The administrative courts, as well as the Supreme Court and the Constitutional Court all rejected a series of complaints and appeals filed by Toplak, Mrak, and several other voters and organizations. In 2012, the Supreme Court ruled that no court had jurisdiction over election-related appeals.

In 2014, the Constitutional Court ruled that the parliament should enact the legislation to require that all polling stations be accessible. It also ruled that all the complaints and appeals submitted on or after the day of elections should be rejected because "the election procedure was completed."

Four wheelchair users, including Franc Toplak and Iztok Mrak, in order to achieve accessible voting, requested accessible polling stations in advance of the 2015 referendum on gay marriage. Election authorities and courts, including the Supreme Court and the Constitutional Court, rejected their requests to decide on the issue before the voting day.

During the course of proceedings, in the week preceding the referendum, election authorities built a ramp at the entrance of Toplak's polling place. In the Mrak's polling place, they opened the back entry to the school in which was the polling place. The school had used the back entry primarily for trash disposal and had a ramp and narrow path used for the rubbish bin transport.

On the day of the referendum, both applicants voted. Toplak used the ramp. In the polling place, the area between the wall and the voting booth was too narrow for the wheelchair, and the staff did not allow the booth to be moved to assure Toplak's privacy during his voting. Consequently, he voted on a table in the middle of the room surrounded by several other persons.

Mrak used the school's back entrance. Due to a narrow rubbish bin path and steep ramp, he waited for passers-by to help him move up the ramp and open the door for him.

In 2016, in separate rulings, the Supreme Court ruled that voters had filed their requests for adaptations too early, and that they should have waited until after the election to complain, and that no court had jurisdiction over pre-election complaints. In 2017, the National Assembly amended the legislation to state that polling stations should be accessible for persons with disabilities. In 2019, the Constitutional Court rejected both plaintiffs' appeals, and they appealed to the ECtHR.

The Harvard Law School, NUI Galway, Equinet, disability organisations, and the Slovenian Equality Defender submitted their expert opinion to the court during the proceedings.

== The court's decision: Secret ballot and voting machines ==
The applicant Toplak was not able to hold a pen and the only way for him to cast ballot without revealing his vote to another person was by the use of assistive technology. Such equipment had been available in Slovenian elections for several years and enabled blind people or persons who were not able to vote independently, but its use had been abandoned in 2017.

The Court wrote that he could have voted "by post, and possibly also at his home", but "in view of his inability to mark the ballot paper by himself," he could have "another person, who would have marked his ballot paper for him and taken care of other practicalities, such as depositing the ballot paper in the ballot box or dispatching it by post." The Court noted that Toplak "did not allege that he had been unable to request the assistance of another person." It observed that he "had a family". That said, it is true that the provision of this kind of assistance most likely meant that he, while being unable to mark the ballot paper by himself, would have had to disclose his electoral choice to the person assisting him, the Court wrote. However, not enabling him with technology that would assure that he votes without sharing his vote with another person was not in breach of the European Convention on Human Rights.

The Court considered the CRPD Committee’s decision Fiona Given v. Australia, n. 19/2014 of 16 February 2018, but noted that "the use of assistive technologies no doubt requires significant financial investment", that "the operation of voting machines poses potential problems for the secrecy of the voting procedure", and that "voting machines do not appear to be widely available in the member States." According to the Court, there is no consensus among the member States as to the use of voting machines as a requirement for the effective exercise of the voting rights by people with disabilities. The court stated that "the decision as to whether voting machines should be used for that purpose is to be made primarily by the national authorities." The court found it relevant that "a very small number of people with disabilities had used voting machines in the past, that such machines could not assist people with all types of disabilities and that their provision was linked to high costs." The court found the reasons provided by the Constitutional Court "persuasive". The court was of the opinion that other options available, especially "the possibility of assistance by a person of his own choice", Slovenia has not "failed to strike a fair balance between the protection of the interests of the community and respect for the first applicant’s rights and freedoms, as safeguarded by the Convention."

== The court's decision: Accessibility of polling places ==
The court said that the Convention does not require that all voters go through buildings’ front entrances.

In regards to Mrak having used the back entrance intended for rubbish disposal and having to wait and ask a passerby to push him up the ramp, the Court wrote that "since voting is organised ad hoc in buildings that otherwise serve other purposes it might be particularly difficult to ensure full accessibility in respect of the voting process for people with different types of disability in advance" and since "the improvement of accessibility in the built environment may take time," it "is essential that in the meantime the domestic authorities react with the requisite diligence to ensure that people with disabilities can vote freely and by secret ballot. In the present case, the National Commission responded promptly and constructively to the applicants’ request that their respective polling stations be rendered accessible. ... Even if the applicants did encounter certain problems ... those problems do not appear to have produced a particularly prejudicial impact on them and been such as to have reached the threshold of discrimination ... or to indicate indifference to their needs on the part of the respondent State." The court concluded that the applicants were not treated discriminatively.

== The court's decision: Referendum disputes ==
Before the Toplak ruling, the European Court of Human Rights had refrained from deciding referendum-related cases. Traditionally, it had relied on the wording of the First Protocol, which states that it only covers 'choice of the legislature'.

In the Toplak and Mrak judgment, the court wrote that "free expression of opinion in the choice" and "secrecy [that] must be observed in respect of the voting procedure" are guarantees that "also apply to voting in public referendums".

== The court's decision: Damage and attorney fees ==
For non‑pecuniary damage, the court awarded Mrak EUR 3,200 and Toplak’s daughters, after he had died during the proceedings, EUR 1,600 each. For the court costs and legal fees before domestic courts, the applicants claimed EUR 18,000 each, and for the ECHR proceedings-related attorney costs, they requested EUR 9,000 each. The Court refused to cover any expenses for the domestic proceedings and awarded each applicant EUR 1,500.

== Aftermath ==
The plaintiffs' attorney Slavko Vesenjak said: “The judgment is a blow to the equality of persons with disabilities. Accepting that they may be sent to the backside of buildings is disappointing. We will consider appealing to the European Court’s Grand Chamber.”

“We feel that we are second class citizens to the ECHR. Everyone means everyone, and the state should assure the possibility to cast a secret ballot to everyone”, the Slovenian Disability Rights Association president Sebastjan Kamenik commented on the judgment.

The applicant Toplak's nephew said that the judgment was a "European slap in the face to the Supreme Court judge Kerševan", who was the judge rapporteur with the Supreme Court's ruling for which the ECtHR ruled that it violated the Convention.

Andrew Cutting, the Council of Europe's spokesperson, quoted Jurij Toplak, law professor at the Alma Mater Europaea, who represented the applicants, saying that about half of polling places in Europe were not accessible or lacked equipment for blind voters to cast a secret ballot.
