= Muretinci =

- Location in Slovenia
- Coordinates: 46°23′2.08″N 15°59′33.95″E
- Country: Slovenia
- Traditional region: Styria
- Statistical region: Drava
- Municipality: Gorišnica

Area
  - Total: 3.58 km^{2} (1.38 sq mi)
- Elevation: 209.6 m (688 ft)

Population (2020)
  - Total: 443
  - Density: 124/km^{2} (320/sq mi)

Muretinci (pronounced [ˈmuːɾɛtintsi]) is a settlement on the left bank of the Drava River in the Municipality of Gorišnica in northeastern Slovenia. The area is part of the traditional region of Styria. It is now included in the Drava Statistical Region.

Muretinci Castle is a Renaissance castle in the settlement. It dates to the mid-17th century. It has four corner towers connected on three sides and an arcaded courtyard.
