= Formin, Gorišnica =

Formin
- Location in Slovenia
- Coordinates: 46°24′55.66″N 15°58′30.45″E
- Country: Slovenia
- Traditional region: Styria
- Statistical region: Drava
- Municipality: Gorišnica

Area
  - Total: 0.92 km^{2} (0.36 sq mi)
- Elevation: 215.5 m (707 ft)

Population (2020)
  - Total: 366
  - Density: 400/km^{2} (1,000/sq mi)

Formin (pronounced [fɔɾˈmiːn]) is a village east of Ptuj in northeastern Slovenia. It lies in the Municipality of Gorišnica between the right bank of the Pesnica River and an artificial canal of the Drava River, created for use by the Formin hydroelectric power plant, built south of the settlement in 1978. The area is part of the traditional region of Styria. It is now included in the Drava Statistical Region.

There is a small chapel-shrine in the settlement. It was built in 1914.
