= Zamušani =

- Location in Slovenia
- Coordinates: 46°25′12.53″N 16°1′28.44″E
- Country: Slovenia
- Traditional region: Styria
- Statistical region: Drava
- Municipality: Gorišnica

Area
  - Total: 3.49 km^{2} (1.35 sq mi)
- Elevation: 209.2 m (686 ft)

Population (2020)
  - Total: 538
  - Density: 154/km^{2} (399/sq mi)

Zamušani (pronounced [ˈzaːmuʃani], in older sources also Samožani, German: Samuschen) is a settlement in the Municipality of Gorišnica in northeastern Slovenia. The area is part of the traditional region of Styria. It is now included in the Drava Statistical Region.

There is a T-shaped Neo-Gothic chapel-shrine in the settlement. It was built in 1929.

The railway line from Pragersko to Čakovec runs through the settlement.
