= Ptuj Airport =

Ptuj Airport Letališče Ptuj
- IATA: none; ICAO: LJPT

Summary
- Airport type: Public
- Operator: Aeroclub Ptuj
- Serves: Ptuj
- Location: Moškanjci
- Elevation AMSL: 701 ft / 214 m
- Coordinates: 46°25′7″N 15°59′2″E
- Website: http://ak-ptuj.com
- Interactive map of Ptuj Airport

Runways
| Direction | Length | | Surface |
| Direction | ft | m | Surface |
|---|---|---|---|
| | 7,831 | 2,387 | Grass |

Ptuj Airport (ICAO: LJPT) (Slovene: Letališče Ptuj) is a sport and tourist airport, located to the north of Moškanjci near Ptuj in Slovenia.
