= Zagojiči =

- Location in Slovenia
- Coordinates: 46°24′12.43″N 15°58′48.88″E
- Country: Slovenia
- Traditional region: Styria
- Statistical region: Drava
- Municipality: Gorišnica

Area
  - Total: 1 km^{2} (0.39 sq mi)
- Elevation: 214.8 m (705 ft)

Population (2020)
  - Total: 180
  - Density: 180/km^{2} (470/sq mi)

Zagojiči (pronounced [zaɡɔˈjiːtʃi], in older sources also Sagojiči, German: Sagoitschen) is a small settlement in the Municipality of Gorišnica in northeastern Slovenia. The area is part of the traditional region of Styria. It is now included in the Drava Statistical Region.

There is a small Neo-Gothic chapel-shrine with a metal belfry in the settlement. It was built in the early 20th century.
