= Gorišnica =

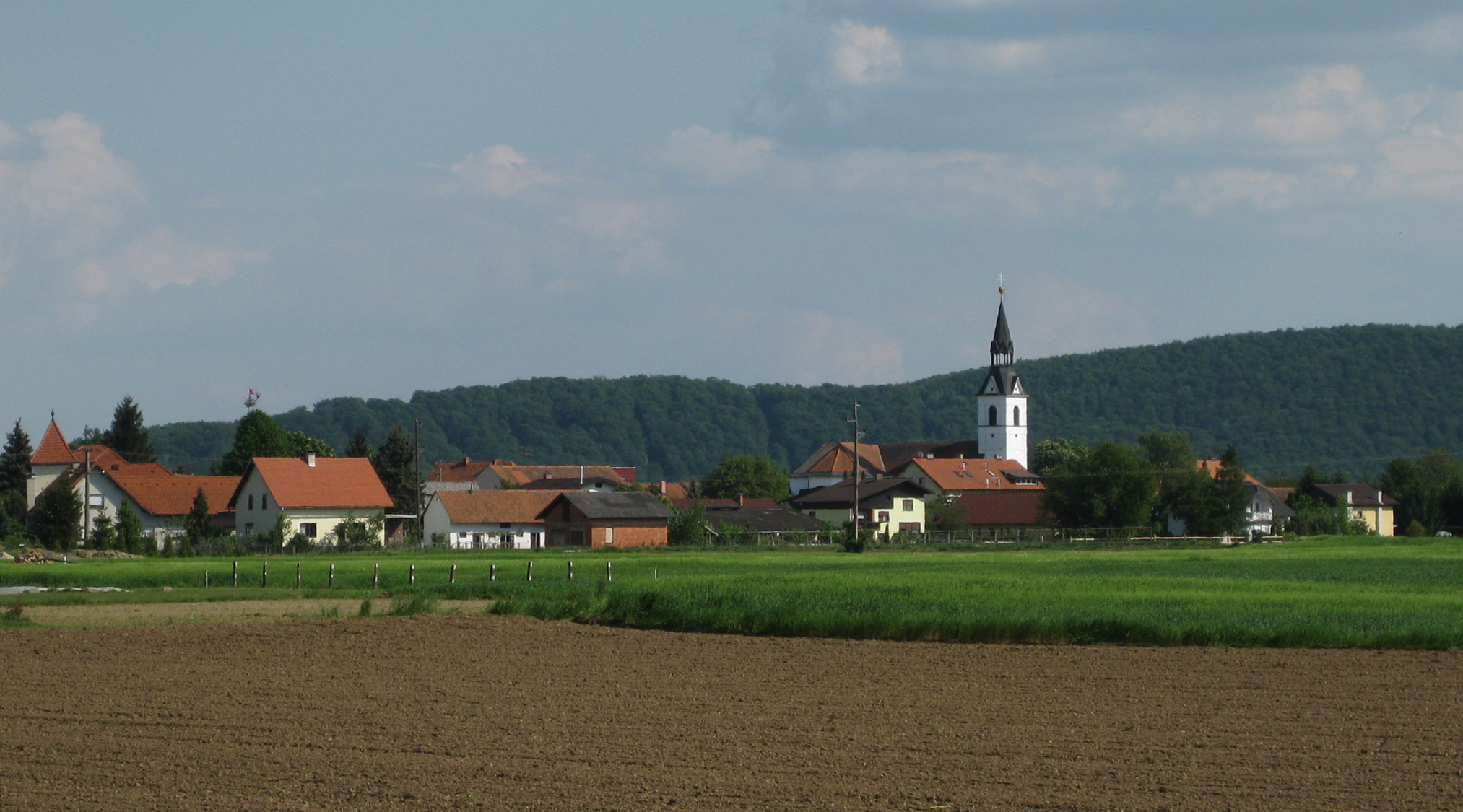

- Location of Gorišnica in Slovenia
- Coordinates: 46°24′44″N 16°00′47″E
- Country: Slovenia
- Traditional region: Styria
- Statistical region: Drava
- Municipality: Gorišnica

Area
  - Total: 0.92 km^{2} (0.36 sq mi)
- Elevation: 210 m (690 ft)

Population (2020)
  - Total: 856
  - Density: 930/km^{2} (2,400/sq mi)
- Postal code: 2272 Gorišnica

Gorišnica (pronounced [ɡɔˈɾiːʃnitsa]) is a settlement in the Municipality of Gorišnica in Slovenia. The area traditionally belonged to the region of Styria. It is now included in the Drava Statistical Region.

The parish church in the village is dedicated to Saint Margaret and belongs to the Roman Catholic Archdiocese of Maribor. It was first mentioned in written documents dating to 1391, but the current building dates to the early 19th century.

== Gallery ==
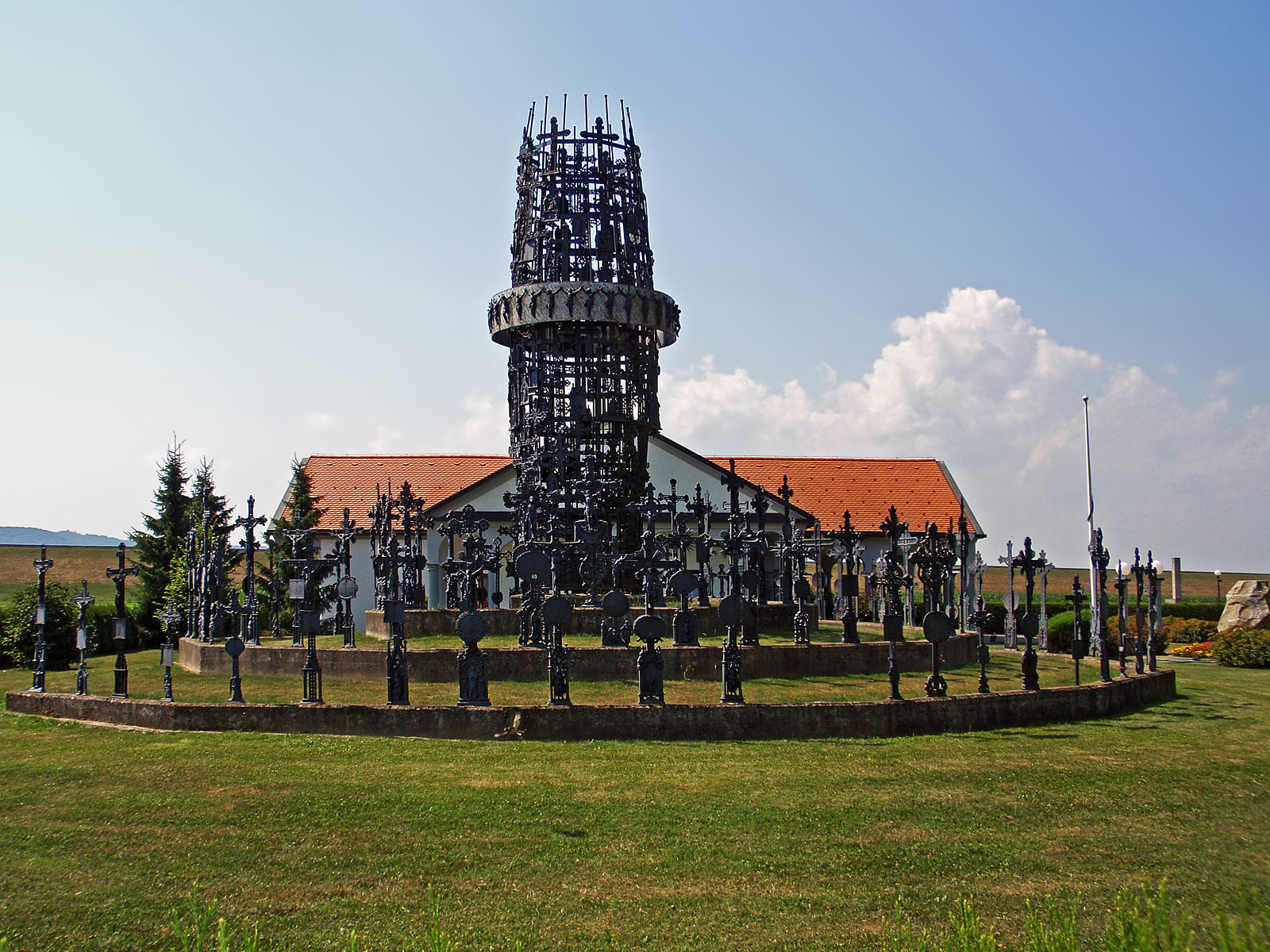
Gorišnica cemetery
