= Mark Villiger =

Swiss judge (1950–2023)

Mark E. Villiger
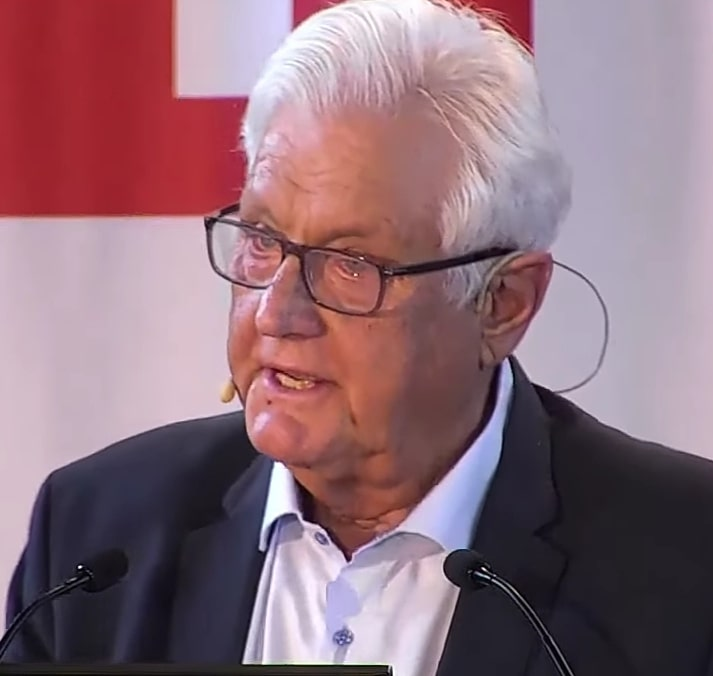
- Villiger in 2023

Judge of the European Court of Human Rights in respect of Liechtenstein
- In office 1 September 2006 – 31 August 2015
- Succeeded by: Carlo Ranzoni

Personal details
- Born: 17 May 1950 Louis Trichardt, South Africa
- Died: 10 December 2023 (aged 73)
- Website: https://markvilliger.com/

Mark E. Villiger (17 May 1950 – 10 December 2023) was a Swiss judge who served as Judge of the European Court of Human Rights in respect of Liechtenstein.

== Biography ==
Villager was born in Louis Trichardt, South Africa on 17 May 1950. He grew up in Mozambique and Feldkirch, Austria before he studied law at the University of Zurich. He began his career at the European Court of Human Rights in 1983 as a secretary in the Human Rights Commission and assumed as a judge of the ECHR in 2006. Villiger died on 10 December 2023, at the age of 67.
