= Gajevci =

- Location in Slovenia
- Coordinates: 46°23′47.61″N 16°1′2.32″E
- Country: Slovenia
- Traditional region: Styria
- Statistical region: Drava
- Municipality: Gorišnica

Area
  - Total: 2.58 km^{2} (1.00 sq mi)
- Elevation: 207.2 m (680 ft)

Population (2020)
  - Total: 315
  - Density: 122/km^{2} (316/sq mi)

Gajevci (pronounced [ˈɡaːjɛu̯tsi]) is a roadside village on the left bank of the Drava River east of Ptuj in northeastern Slovenia. It lies in the Municipality of Gorišnica. The area is part of the traditional region of Styria. It is now included in the Drava Statistical Region.

There is a small chapel-shrine in the settlement. It was built in 1911.
