= Equinet =

Organization of equality bodies in Europe

Equinet - the European Network of Equality Bodies
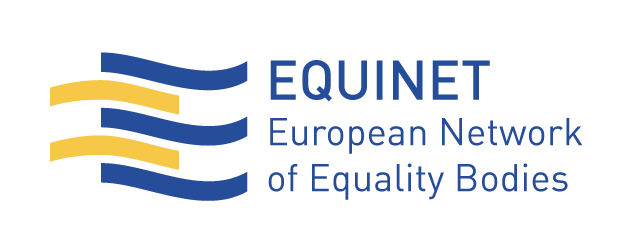
- Founded: 2007
- Type: Not-for-profit
- Purpose: Anti-discrimination, equality
- Location: Brussels, Belgium,
- Region served: Europe
- Method: Coordinating, Informing policy, Training
- Members: 47 (2020)
- Key people: Anne Gaspard, Co-Director; Tamás Kádár, Co-Director
- Website: www.equineteurope.org

Equinet is the European Network of Equality Bodies. It serves as a professional platform for cooperation, capacity building and peer support amongst Equality Bodies around the legal interpretation and implementation in practice of the EU equal treatment Directives and around the promotion of equality and the elimination of discrimination.

National Equality Bodies have been established on the basis of the EU equal treatment Directives, which provide that each Member State shall have (at least) one Equality Body with the power to, among other, give independent assistance to victims of discrimination. The Equality Bodies are specialised authorities whose staff are trained and experienced to handle cases of discrimination. They are empowered to counteract discrimination across the range of grounds including age, disability, gender, race or ethnic origin, religion or belief, and sexual orientation. Some National Equality Bodies also fulfil the role of national human rights institution or ombudsman.

Equinet is an umbrella organisation for European equality bodies and has no mandate to provide any kind of legal assistance to individual victims of discrimination. The organisation however provides contact details (see below) for equality bodies based in all EU Member States and beyond.

== History ==
Equinet builds upon the two-year project "Strengthening the co-operation between specialised bodies for the implementation of equal treatment legislation" (2002-2004). The initiative to create a network of equality bodies was taken by the Migration Policy Group, who also acted as Equinet's Secretariat until 2007. Equinet was established as an independent structure in 2007 with the creation of the Equinet Secretariat in Brussels and its registration as a not-for-profit international association (AISBL) under Belgian law.

== Mission and Objectives ==
Equinet promotes equality in Europe by supporting Equality Bodies to be independent and effective catalysts for more equal societies, and delivers its mission in a way that embodies and promotes its values. Equinet works to:

1. Strengthen and support Equality Bodies to achieve equality for all
2. Act as an expert voice of Equality Bodies in Europe on equality and non-discrimination
3. Maintain and improve Equinet’s capacity as a strong, resilient, and innovative Network

== Approach ==
Support & Empower - Equinet provides general support to Equality Bodies through capacity building activities, facilitates peer-to-peer exchange and knowledge sharing across Equality Bodies, promotes and consolidates Equality Bodies’ position as national level experts on equality and non-discrimination, including by supporting the adoption and implementation of legislation on European Standards for Equality Bodies.

Connect & Network - Equinet builds bridges between Equality Bodies and partners (policymakers, civil society organisations, European institutions, etc.) as well as other actors related to equality and non-discrimination, provides a forum for Equality Bodies to network, and creates useful connections at European level.

Innovate & Disseminate - Equinet acts as a research & knowledge Hub, creating new knowledge on innovative issues related to nondiscrimination and equality, as well as disseminating this knowledge among Equality Bodies and other stakeholders.

Catalyse & Strengthen – Equinet stimulates expert and informed reflection on the situation of equality and non-discrimination in Europe, strengthening the European equality framework, channelling the learnings and voices of Equality Bodies in European discussions, consultations and legislative processes. For example, Equinet submits expert third party interventions to international courts, as in the Toplak and Mrak v. Slovenia ECtHR case.

== Standards for Equality Bodies ==
The current provisions on equality bodies leave a large discretion to the Member States as to the mandate, powers, independence, effectiveness, and resources of these bodies. Differences between the Member States in the structure and functioning of equality bodies result in unequal protection against discrimination across the EU. There are still gaps in the protection for some grounds and/or some fields in around a third of Member States. Furthermore, a significant number of equality bodies are not fully independent from the government and the lack of resources prevent them from fulfilling their missions, such as conducting surveys.

2018 saw remarkable developments on standards for equality bodies, both at European Commission and Council of Europe level. These standards acknowledge and respond to the full diversity and complexity of equality bodies, with diverse types of mandates, sets of functions and competences and range of grounds covered being addressed.

=== European Commission: Recommendation on Standards for Equality Bodies ===
The European Commission adopted a Recommendation on standards for equality bodies in June 2018, in order to ensure the independence and effectiveness of national equality bodies. The Recommendation, a legal act of the commission, sets minimum standards concerning the mandate of equality bodies; their independence; their effectiveness, including sufficient resources and appropriate powers; and the national institutional architecture for equality.

=== ECRI: Revised General Policy Recommendation No.2 on Equality bodies to combat racism and intolerance at national level ===
The Revised GPR No.2, General Policy Recommendation on Equality bodies to combat racism and intolerance at national level, was adopted at ECRI's 74th plenary meeting in December 2017. It addresses the establishment of equality bodies, the institutional architecture of equality bodies, their functions and competences and their independence, effectiveness and accessibility.

This standard will be implemented as part of the country monitoring by ECRI and the constructive dialogue between ECRI and the Council of Europe member states.

=== Proposed Legislative Initiative - Equality Bodies: Binding Standards ===
Following the EU Anti-racism Action Plan and the LGBTIQ+ and Roma Equality Strategies, in which the Commission raised the possibility of proposing EU-level legislation to strengthen the role and independence of equality bodies, in 2021, the Commission launched a new initiative through which it intends to strengthen equality bodies by setting minimum standards on how they operate in all grounds of discrimination and areas covered by EU equality rules. For updates on the standards process, see the Equinet webpage dedicated to standards for equality bodies

== Members ==
Most Equinet members belong to the European Union, while ten equality bodies come from outside the European Union (Albania, Bosnia and Herzegovina, Georgia, Kosovo, Macedonia, Moldova, Montenegro, Norway, Serbia, and the UK).

List of Equinet members
Country	Name of the Equality Body	Homepage
Albania	Commissioner for the Protection from Discrimination	www.kmd.al
Austria	Disability Ombudsman	www.behindertenanwalt.gv.at
Austria	Ombud for Equal Treatment	www.gleichbehandlungsanwaltschaft.at
Belgium	Unia (Interfederal Centre for Equal Opportunities)	www.unia.be
Belgium	Institute for the Equality of Women and Men	igvm-iefh.belgium.be
Bosnia and Herzegovina	The Institution of Human Rights Ombudsman of Bosnia and Herzegovina	www.ombudsmen.gov.ba
Bulgaria	Commission for Protection Against Discrimination	www.kzd-nondiscrimination.com
Croatia	Office of the Ombudsman	www.ombudsman.hr
Croatia	Ombudsperson for Gender Equality	www.prs.hr
Croatia	Ombudswoman for Persons with Disabilities	www.posi.hr
Cyprus	Office of the Commissioner for Administration and Human Rights (Ombudsman)	www.ombudsman.gov.cy
Czech Republic	Public Defender of Rights	www.ochrance.cz
Denmark	Danish Institute for Human Rights	www.humanrights.dk
Estonia	Gender Equality and Equal Treatment Commissioner	www.svv.ee
Finland	Ombudsman for Equality	www.tasa-arvo.fi
Finland	Non-Discrimination Ombudsman	www.syrjinta.fi
France	Defender of Rights	www.defenseurdesdroits.fr
(Georgia (country)) Georgia	Public defender of Georgia	www.ombudsman.ge
Germany	Federal Anti-Discrimination Agency	www.antidiskriminierungsstelle.de
Greece	Ombudsman	www.synigoros.gr
Hungary	Office of the Commissioner for Fundamental Rights	www.ajbh.hu
(Republic of Ireland) Ireland	Irish Human Rights and Equality Commission	www.ihrec.ie
Italy	National Office against Racial Discrimination - UNAR	www.unar.it
Kosovo*	Ombudsperson Institution of Kosovo	www.oik-rks.org
Latvia	Office of the Ombudsman	www.tiesibsargs.lv
Lithuania	Office of the Equal Opportunities Ombudsperson	www.lygybe.lt
Luxembourg	Centre for Equal Treatment	www.cet.lu
North Macedonia	Commission for Prevention and Protection against Discrimination	www.kzd.mk
Malta	National Commission for the Promotion of Equality	www.equality.gov.mt
Malta	Commission for the Rights of Persons with Disabilities	www.crpd.org.mt
Moldova	Council on Preventing and Eliminating Discrimination and Ensuring Equality	www.egalitate.md
Montenegro	Protector of Human Rights and Freedoms (Ombudsman)	www.ombudsman.co.me
Netherlands	Netherlands Institute for Human Rights	www.mensenrechten.nl
Norway	Equality and Anti-Discrimination Ombud	www.ldo.no
Poland	Commissioner for Human Rights	www.rpo.gov.pl
Portugal	High Commission for Migration	www.acm.gov.pt
Portugal	Commission for Citizenship and Gender Equality – CIG	www.cig.gov.pt
Portugal	Commission for Equality in Labour and Employment - CITE	www.cite.gov.pt
Romania	National Council for Combating Discrimination	www.cncd.org.ro
Serbia	Commissioner for the Protection of Equality	www.ravnopravnost.gov.rs
Slovakia	National Centre for Human Rights	www.snslp.sk
Slovenia	Advocate of the Principle of Equality	www.zagovornik.net
Spain	Council for the Elimination of Ethnic or Racial Discrimination	www.igualdadynodiscriminacion.msssi.es
Spain	Institute of Women and for Equal Opportunities	www.inmujer.es
Sweden	Equality Ombudsman	www.do.se
(United Kingdom) UK	Equality and Human Rights Commission (Great Britain)	www.equalityhumanrights.com
(United Kingdom) UK	Equality Commission for Northern Ireland	www.equalityni.org

== Organizational structure ==
=== Governance ===
==== General Assembly of Members ====
The main decisions concerning the general direction of Equinet are taken by the General Assembly of Members. This assembly is made up of all the members of the network and is convened at least once a year for an annual general meeting (AGM). The General Assembly has the power to approve new members and, following a nomination process by members, to vote for representatives on the Executive Board etc.

==== Executive Board ====
Management and administration of the network is delegated to the Executive Board. The Board is also responsible for the preparation and implementation of the AGM's decisions. Executive Board Members, the advisor to the Board and the treasurer receive no salary for their input.

==== Working Groups ====
Working groups are composed of staff from member organisations and led by a moderator. Working groups are the main medium for the sharing of expertise between different equality bodies. There were five Equinet Working Groups in 2019:

- Equality Law in Practice – supporting equality bodies in their legal work
- Gender Equality – supporting the effective promotion of gender equality and the combat against gender discrimination by equality bodies
- Communication Strategies and Practices – supporting equality bodies in their communication work
- Policy Formation – supporting a dialogue on the learning from the work of equality bodies
- Research and Data Collection - supporting the use and collection of data on complaints

==== The Secretariat ====
The Secretariat reports to the Executive Board and implements the annual work plan of the organisation. It is responsible for the daily activities of the network and assists individual members with their requests. It assists and coordinates the work of the Working Groups. There are 9 employees working at the Equinet secretariat.

=== Financing ===
Equinet has two key sources of income:

- Grant of the European Commission under Citizens, Equality, Rights and Values Programme of the European Union
- Membership fees
