= Mala Vas, Gorišnica =

Mala Vas
- Location in Slovenia
- Coordinates: 46°23′24.73″N 16°0′13.21″E
- Country: Slovenia
- Traditional region: Styria
- Statistical region: Drava
- Municipality: Gorišnica

Area
  - Total: 2.68 km^{2} (1.03 sq mi)
- Elevation: 208.9 m (685 ft)

Population (2020)
  - Total: 250
  - Density: 93/km^{2} (240/sq mi)

Mala Vas (pronounced [ˈmaːla ˈʋaːs]) is a roadside village on the left bank of the Drava River east of Ptuj in northeastern Slovenia. It lies in the Municipality of Gorišnica. The area is part of the traditional region of Styria. It is now included in the Drava Statistical Region.

== Area chapels ==
There are two small chapel-shrines in the settlement, one dating to 1885 and the other to 1921.
