= Moškanjci =

- Location in Slovenia
- Coordinates: 46°25′28.33″N 15°59′14.13″E
- Country: Slovenia
- Traditional region: Styria
- Statistical region: Drava
- Municipality: Gorišnica

Area
  - Total: 4.64 km^{2} (1.79 sq mi)
- Elevation: 212.9 m (698 ft)

Population (2020)
  - Total: 715
  - Density: 154/km^{2} (399/sq mi)

Moškanjci (pronounced [mɔˈʃkaːntsi]) is a settlement in the Municipality of Gorišnica in northeastern Slovenia. The area is part of the traditional region of Styria. It is now included in the Drava Statistical Region.

There is a small chapel-shrine in the settlement. It was built in the 1880s.

The railway line from Ptuj to Ormož runs through the settlement.

Ptuj Airport (ICAO code LJPT) is just to the north of the main settlement in the territory of Moškanjci.
