= Tibolci =

- Location in Slovenia
- Coordinates: 46°25′59.65″N 16°0′2.48″E
- Country: Slovenia
- Traditional region: Styria
- Statistical region: Drava
- Municipality: Gorišnica

Area
  - Total: 1.98 km^{2} (0.76 sq mi)
- Elevation: 224.5 m (737 ft)

Population (2020)
  - Total: 204
  - Density: 103/km^{2} (267/sq mi)

Tibolci (pronounced [ˈtiːbɔu̯tsi], in older sources also Tibavci, German: Tibolzen is a settlement on the left bank of the Pesnica River in the Municipality of Gorišnica in northeastern Slovenia. The area is part of the traditional region of Styria. It is now included in the Drava Statistical Region.

There is a small chapel-shrine with a belfry in the settlement. It was built in 1921.
