= Cunkovci =

Village in Styria, Slovenia

- Location in Slovenia
- Coordinates: 46°24′55.66″N 15°58′30.45″E
- Country: Slovenia
- Traditional region: Styria
- Statistical region: Drava
- Municipality: Gorišnica

Area
  - Total: 0.92 km^{2} (0.36 sq mi)
- Elevation: 215.5 m (707 ft)

Population (2020)
  - Total: 101
  - Density: 110/km^{2} (280/sq mi)

Cunkovci (pronounced [ˈtsuːŋkɔu̯tsi]) is a small village east of Ptuj in northeastern Slovenia. It lies in the Municipality of Gorišnica. The area is part of the traditional region of Styria and is now included in the Drava Statistical Region.

There is a small chapel-shrine in the settlement. It was built in 1922.
