= Slavko Vesenjak =

Slovenian lawyer (born 1981)

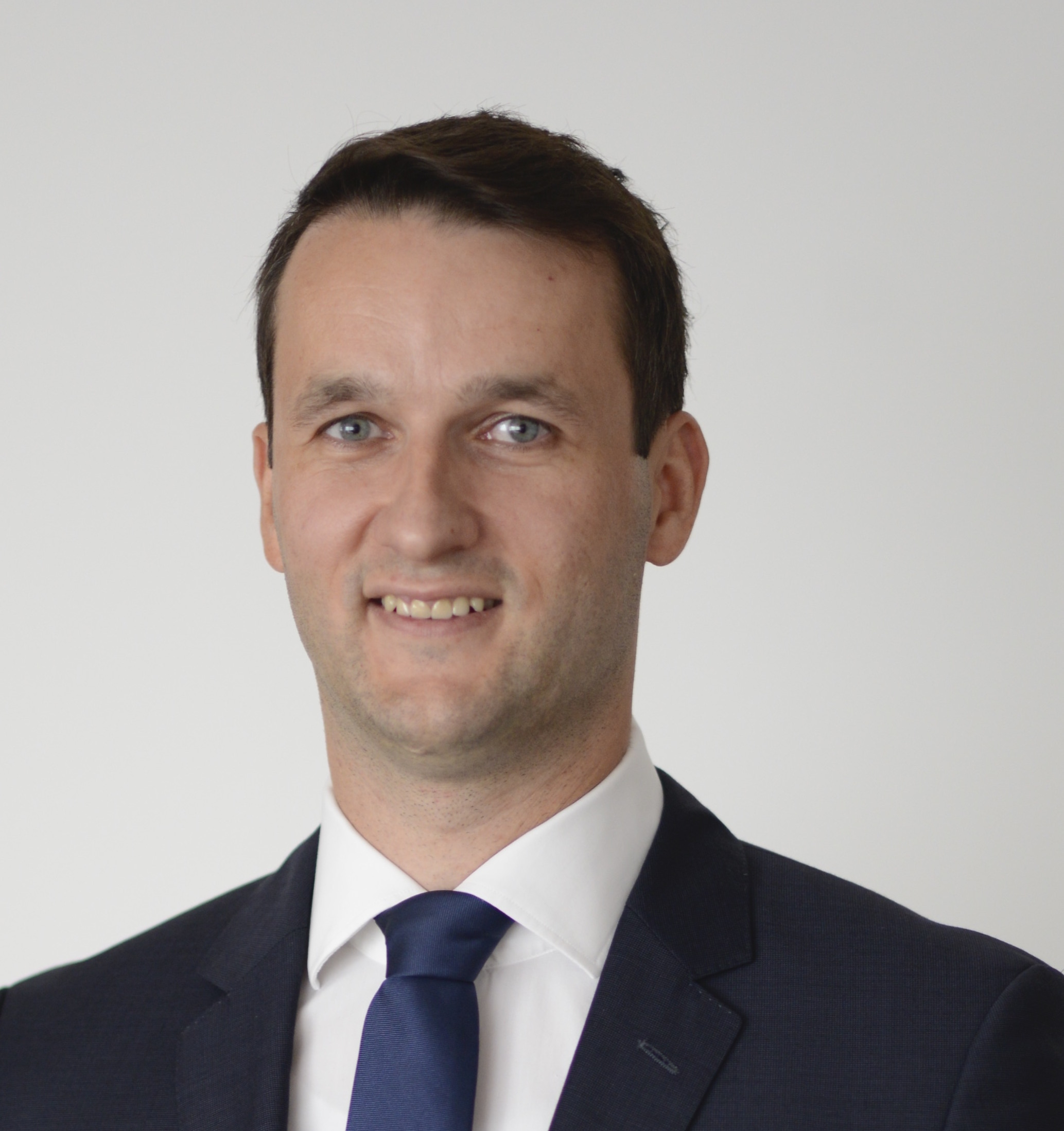
- Attorney Slavko Vesenjak
- Born: Ptuj, Slovenia
- Education: University of Maribor (Law Degree); Erasmus University Rotterdam (Erasmus); University of California, Los Angeles (research)
- Occupation: Lawyer

Slavko Vesenjak (born 1981) is a Slovenian lawyer. He is the author of scientific articles and a lecturer. He has represented several high-profile cases before the Supreme Court and the European Court of Human Rights. He was a member of the National Electoral Commission.

== Criminal Law ==
In 2019, the Supreme Court decided that a few cannabis seedlings did not constitute a crime and acquitted the defendant, who was defended by lawyer Vesenjak. The Supreme Court clarified that the article of the Criminal Code, which deals with illicit drug trafficking (Article 186 KZ-1), states that those who “unjustifiably produce, process, sell or offer for sale or for the purpose of selling or placing in buys, stores or transfers or mediates in the sale or purchase or otherwise unjustifiably places on the market plants or substances classified as illicit drugs or illicit substances in sport, or precursors used in the manufacture of illicit drugs ", and that the word production itself "already includes production, cultivation on a larger scale for resale, because even if we start from the Dictionary of the Slovene Literary Language, the word produce means to produce larger quantities." The Supreme Court judges reiterated that production means the production or cultivation of a large quantity of banned substances intended for a wider circle of people.

In the high-profile case of the murder of Waldorf school principal Elena Begant, he successfully represented husband Alexander Begant, who hit his sleeping wife on the head with an ax eleven times and was sentenced after trial to a lower sentence than agreed at the pre-trial hearing. He first signed a confession and a motion for 20 years in prison, but was sentenced by a judge to 18 years after the hearing, and was also exempted from paying the costs of the proceedings due to his long prison sentence.

== Corporate and tax law ==
Vesenjak also succeeded in the resounding decision of the Supreme Court, in July 2017, that all migrant workers, those who live in Slovenia and work in another country, must be taxed in the same way as others. The Supreme Court decided that the country will have to return the overpaid amounts. Vesenjak represented the Trade Union of Migrant Workers of Slovenia. He was an attorney in a highly publicized case involving the ownership of multiple Slovenian media including Jana, Salomon, and others.

== Collective action ==
Lawyer Vesenjak represents disabled voters in the procedure of a collective lawsuit against the Republic of Slovenia in the amount of EUR 54 million. The Slovenian Disability Rights Association initiated the procedure because, twelve years after the entry into force of the Convention on the Rights of Persons with Disabilities, it has still not been implemented, as polling stations are not accessible to persons with disabilities. This is one of the first collective action proceedings in Slovenia since the National Assembly passed the Collective Actions Act in 2017.

== European Court of Human Rights ==
Vesenjak represented disabled voters the European Court of Human Rights discrimination case Toplak and Mrak v. Slovenia in which the Court found that Slovenia violated the voters’ rights. Prior to the 2015 referendum, two disabled voters asked for their polling stations to be accessible. Electoral authorities and courts rejected their applications and appeals. Ahead of the 2019 European Parliament elections, the two applications have also been extended to elections. When the Supreme Court and the Constitutional Court also rejected all their applications, they lodged an appeal with the European Court of Human Rights together with the Slovenian Disability Rights Association (Drupis). In January 2020, the court initiated proceedings against Slovenia, and in 2021, the court issued its ruling.

The Court also ruled that polling places in Europe need to be accessible for persons with disabilities but accepted that accessibility does not require that voters go through the buildings’ front entrance. It found no violation in Slovenia's abandonment of voting equipment, which had enabled voters to vote by secret ballot. It found acceptable a scheme in which a voter who could not cast ballot by himself had to disclose the vote to a family member who would fill a ballot for him.

In October 2021, the ECHR ruled that the Supreme Court and Constitutional Court had discriminated against both apolicants by claiming that the dispute had been out of the Slovenian courts’ jurisdiction. The ECHR ruled that courts have to provide legal remedies “with preventive effect”.

== Scientific and professional activity ==
Vesenjak is the author of international scientific publications and a lecturer. Among other things, he published an article in the Transition Studies Review by Springer, in the journal with the impact factor Lex Localis, in the Encyclopedia of the US Constitution, published by the American publishing house Facts on File and in Pravna Praksa. Vesenjak lectures on corporate, contract, tax and international commercial law. He prepared his dissertation at the UCLA Law School and in 2006 he received the Rector's Award for the best student of the generation. He was vice-dean of the Faculty of Law of the University of Maribor. He was a member of the National Electoral Commission for two terms in 2006-2008 and 2012–2016.

== Access to public information ==
When the head of the campaign Darko Berlič was convicted for illegal financing of the election campaign of the Maribor mayor Andrej Fištravec, the court did not allow journalist Peter Jančič access to the text of the verdict as public information on the instructions of the Supreme Court. The court's decision was upheld by the Information Commissioner. Vesenjak represented Jančič before the Administrative Court, which ruled in favor of Jančič and overturned the decision of the court and the Information Commissioner.

In legislative and judicial proceedings, he represents migrant workers who are employed in Austria and pay taxes in Slovenia. He represents the Hoče-Slivnica municipality in the case of the first referendum by e-voting in Slovenia before the Constitutional Court.
