= Artificial intelligence of things =

Artificial intelligence combined with the Internet of things

Artificial Intelligence of Things (AIoT) is the combination of artificial intelligence (AI) technologies with the Internet of things (IoT) infrastructure to create systems capable of sensing, learning, and acting on data without continuous human intervention. While IoT focuses on connectivity and sensor data collection, AI enables IoT devices to analyse data in real time and produce actionable outputs, including automated decisions at the edge.

== Applications ==
=== Manufacturing and predictive maintenance ===
Manufacturing accounts for the largest share of AIoT adoption by industry vertical. A common application is predictive maintenance, where sensors measuring vibration, temperature, current draw, and acoustic emissions feed machine learning models trained to detect signatures that precede equipment failure. These systems can flag developing faults weeks or months in advance, and in more advanced deployments can autonomously adjust machine parameters such as motor speed or cooling cycles to delay or prevent failure.

=== Other industries ===
In healthcare, AIoT enables remote patient monitoring through wearable devices that collect vital signs and apply AI models to detect anomalies or predict deterioration. In logistics, GPS and telematics sensors combined with AI models support real-time route optimisation, vehicle maintenance prediction, and fuel cost forecasting. Smart building systems use occupancy, temperature, and energy sensors with AI to dynamically adjust HVAC and lighting, reducing energy consumption.

== Architecture ==
AIoT systems typically operate across three layers: a device layer of sensors and actuators that collect data, a connectivity layer that transmits data via protocols such as MQTT or HTTP, and a compute layer where AI models process the data either in the cloud or at the edge. The trend toward edge-based processing, where inference runs on low-cost processors near the data source rather than in a centralised cloud, has accelerated as hardware costs have fallen and applications increasingly require sub-second response times.

== Market ==
Market sizing estimates for AIoT vary significantly depending on scope and definition. Fortune Business Insights valued the AIoT market at USD 35.65 billion in 2023, projecting growth to USD 253.86 billion by 2030 at a compound annual growth rate of 32.4%. Grand View Research estimated the broader market at USD 171.4 billion in 2024 with a CAGR of 31.7% through 2030, reflecting a wider definition that includes AI-integrated hardware components. North America accounted for approximately 40% of global market share in 2024, with the Asia-Pacific region projected as the fastest-growing market.

== See also ==
- Artificial intelligence in healthcare
- Edge computing
- Predictive maintenance
- Industry 4.0
- Edge AI
