= Mobility mat =

Assistive device for use on rough surfaces

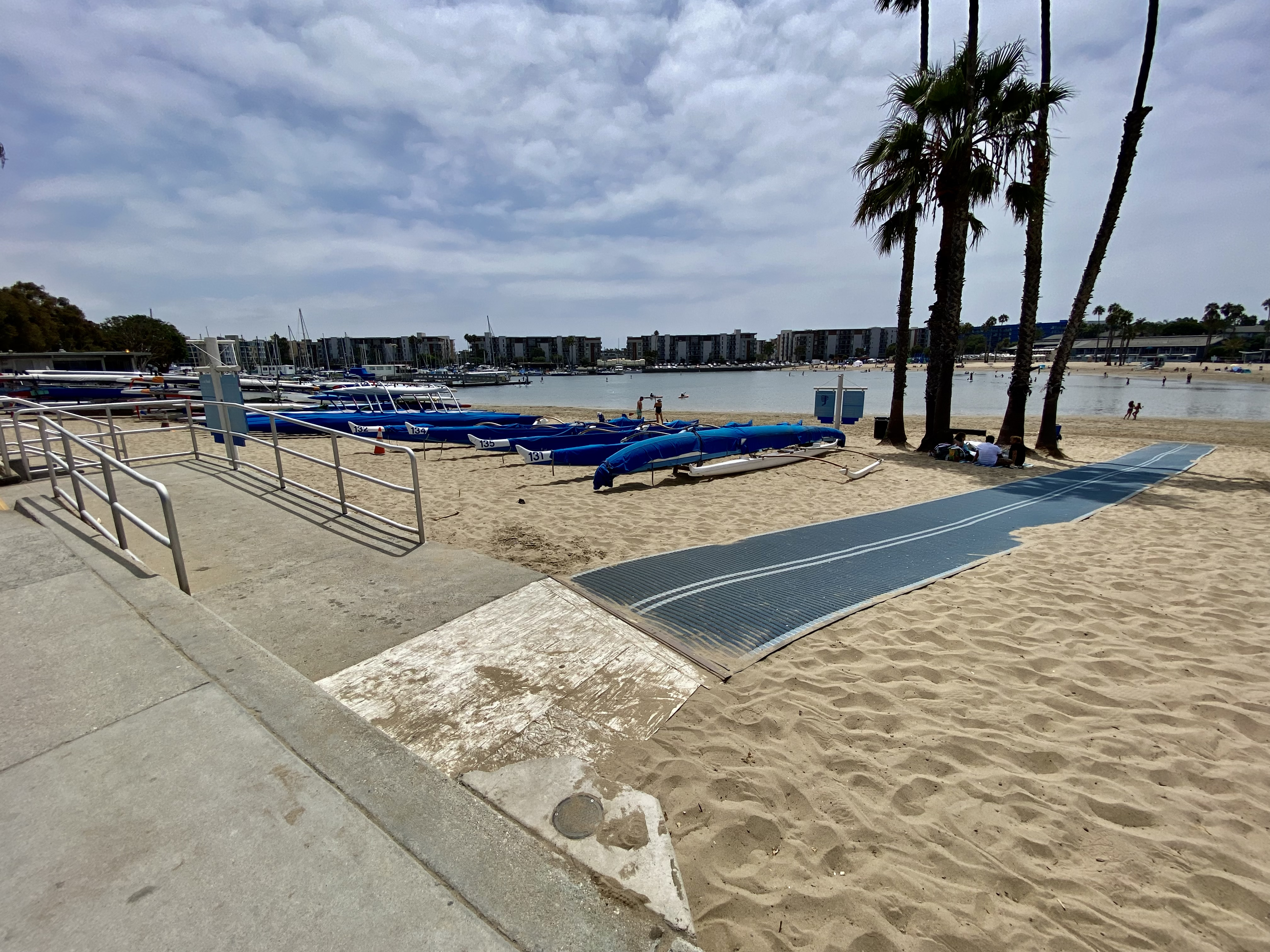
Beach accessibility via wheelchair ramp and mobility mat

A mobility mat (also mobi-mat) is an assistive device that allows wheelchair users access to sandy beaches, dirt trails, or other surfaces that may be challenging for people with limited mobility, like the wooden deck of an ocean pier, or a path covered in wood chips.

Mobi-mats used in Australia are "1.5 metres wide and can be up to 50 metres long." This inclusive technology is a non-slip mat, sometimes with ridges, that provides stability for anyone traveling with the help of wheels, including parents with strollers or wagons, and people using walkers. Most beach mobility mats do not reach the water's edge to prevent tide damage, but they make beaches significantly more wheelchair accessible than they were previously. Some seashore recreation systems may offer beach wheelchairs, that users can borrow for the day.

The mats are portable and can be relocated. Increasing numbers of beaches in Florida and California have installed them; availability should be listed on beach websites or included in informational recordings available by phone.
