= Slovenian Disability Rights Association =

Slovenian organization

- Abbreviation: Drupis
- Formation: 2012; 14 years ago
- Type: Non-profit
- Headquarters: Ljubljana, Slovenia
- President: Sebastjan Kamenik
- Website: www.drupis.si

Slovenian Disability Rights Association (Slovenian: Društvo za pravice invalidov Slovenije, or Drupis) is a disability rights organization in Slovenia. Its goals are to enhance the implementation of the Convention on the Rights of Persons with Disabilities and to assist persons with disabilities through awareness raising and impact litigation. Drupis was founded in 2012.

Sebastjan Kamenik serves as the president of the Association.

== Policy Advocacy ==
The association participated in disability rights procedures at the Supreme Court and Constitutional Court of Slovenia. In 2014, the Constitutional Court ruled that all polling places in elections should be accessible for disabled people. Together with a group of disabled persons, In 2016, Drupis initiated another procedure claiming that the new legislation was still not in line with the convention. In 2020, the Constitutional Court rejected most of the applicants' claims and ruled that abandonment of assistive technology and voting machines was in line with the constitution.

In months preceding the European Parliament elections of 2019, the Association argued in favor of voting rights of persons with intellectual disabilities. The Constitutional Court rejected the appeal lodged by the Association and a voter. Slovenian Disability Rights Association has filed an Amicus Curiae brief in Toplak and Mrak v. Slovenia case at the European Court of Human Rights (ECHR). The cases aimed at a ruling which would require all polling places in Europe be accessible.

=== Toplak and Mrak v. Slovenia ===
In the Toplak and Mrak v. Slovenia judgment, issued October 2021, the Court ruled that Slovenia had violated two wheelchair users' right to an effective legal remedy in a 2015 referendum on gay marriage. Slovenia's Supreme Court had ruled that voters had not had a right to request accessible polling places ahead of the vote, but only after the election would be over. Slovenia's Supreme Court stated that no court in Slovenia had jurisdiction over such cases. The ECHR found a violation of Article 13 of the European Convention of Human Rights. The Court, however, allowed states to not use equipment which voters with disabilities use for casting secret ballots. "We feel that we are second class citizens [to] the ECHR," Kamenik commented for Euractiv. "Everyone means everyone, and the state should assure the possibility to cast a secret ballot to everyone."

Drupis is active in a Council of Europe procedure of execution of the judgment Produkcija Plus v. Slovenia, in which the European Court of Human Rights found that lack of public hearings in some Slovenian courts violates rights of the petitioners. Drupis sent its proposals co-signed by six university professors of the University of Primorska, University of Maribor, Alma Mater Europaea, and Nova University. The Slovenian authorities responded to the proposal with an action plan. The matter has not yet been decided by the Council of Europe's Committee of Ministers and the case is pending.

In November 2019, the Association initiated a class action procedure against Slovenia. It claimed that elections, polling stations, and voting procedures had not been accessible. It requested a compensation of 3000 Euros for each discriminated person. Drupis also submitted a third party intervention in the European Court of Human Rights cases Toplak against Slovenia and Mrak against Slovenia. In January 2020, the Court communicated the cases with the government of Slovenia. The case is ongoing.

Drupis supports Kamenik's case filed with the European Court of Human Rights in which he claims that his secret ballot has been violated when Slovenia has not provided proper equipment and instruction during elections.
