= Carlo Ranzoni =

Swiss jurist (born 1965)

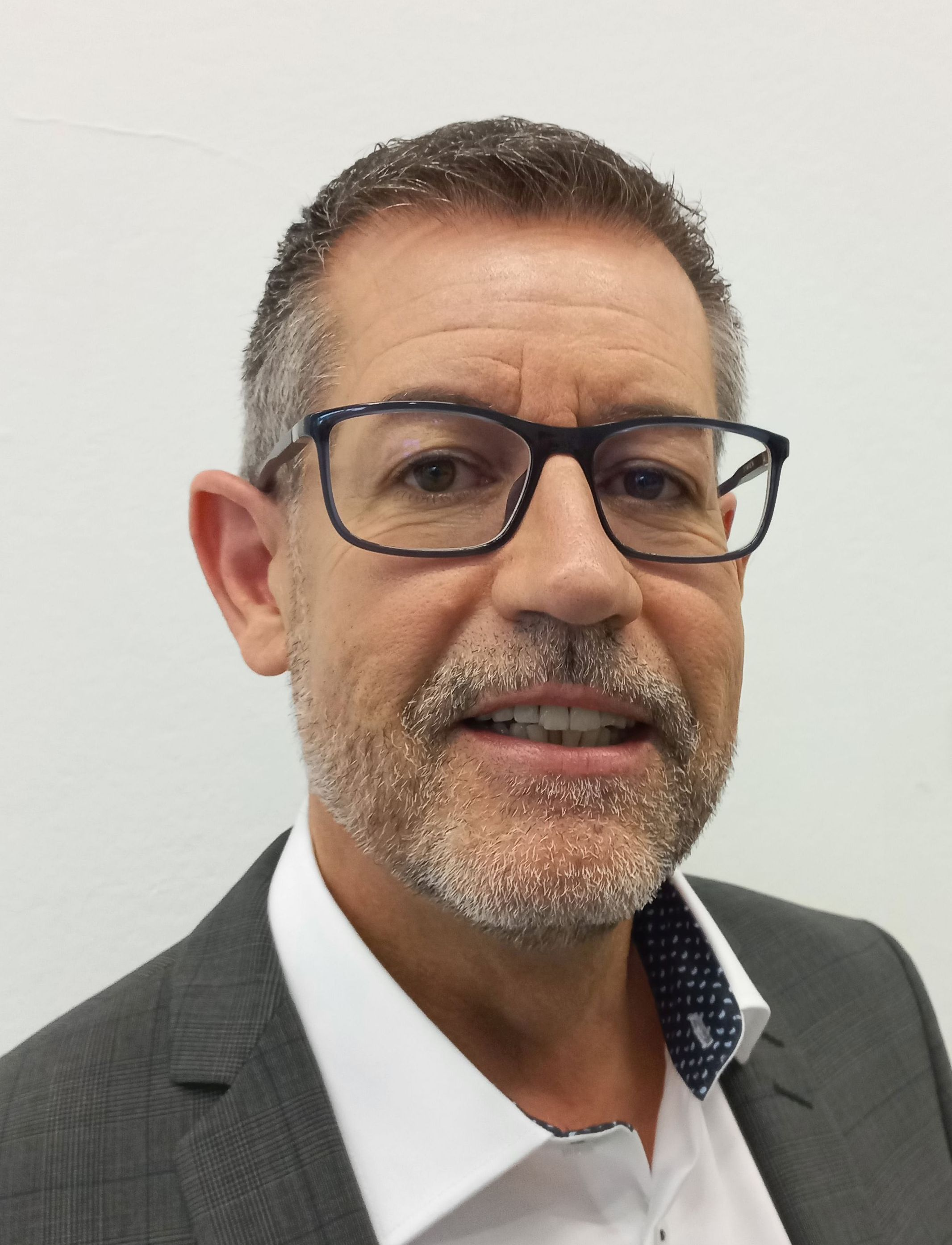

Judge at the European Court of Human Rights
- Incumbent
- Assumed office 2015
- Succeeded by: Mark Villiger

Personal details
- Born: Carlo Ranzoni; 2 November 1965 (age 60) St. Gallen, Switzerland
- Party: The Centre
- Education: University of St. Gallen

Carlo Ranzoni (born 2 November 1965) is a Swiss jurist and judge at the European Court of Human Rights, elected in respect of the Principality of Liechtenstein.

== Education ==
Carlo Ranzoni enrolled in the University of St. Gallen in 1985 and received a Master of Laws degree there in 1989. Before he passed the St. Gallen bar exam in 1992, he gained some practical experience at the District Court (Bezirksgericht) of Flawil, the Court of Appeal (Kantonsgericht) in the Canton of St. Gallen and a law firm, also in St. Gallen.

== Professional career ==
From 1992 to 2000 he was a court clerk at the Court of Appeal in St. Gallen. Concordantly he was a substitute judge at the Court of Appeal in St. Gallen from September 1998 and November 1999. In 2001 he became a judge at the Princely Court of Liechtenstein in Vaduz. Since then, he has represented Liechtenstein in a various conferences at the United Nations and the Council of Europe (CoE). He has also represented Liechtenstein in committees discussing children's and women's rights within the framework of the Lanzarote Convention and the Istanbul Convention.

=== Political affiliation ===
He is a member of The Centre (Die Mitte), a Christian democratic center-right party in Switzerland.

== Judge at the European Court of Human Rights ==
On the 21 April 2015 he was elected by the Parliamentary Assembly of the Council of Europe as a member of the European Court of Human Rights in Strasbourg. He assumed the office on 1 September 2015, succeeding Mark Villiger.
