= Jutta Treviranus =

Canadian academic

Jutta Treviranus Ph.D.
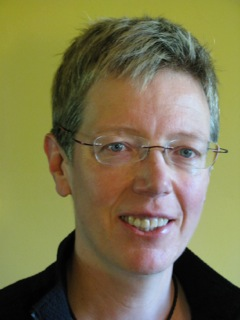
- Occupations: Director, Inclusive Design Research Centre & Professor
- Awards: Women in AI: AI for Good - DEI AI Leader of the Year, 2022 Queen's Diamond Jubilee Medal, 2013 International Electrotechnical Commission (IEC) 1906 Award

Academic background
- Education: University of Toronto

Academic work
- Main interests: Inclusive Design, Accessibility, Social justice

Jutta Treviranus is a full Professor at the Ontario College of Art and Design University (OCADU) in Toronto, Canada. She is the director and founder of the Inclusive Design Research Centre (IDRC) and the Inclusive Design Institute (IDI).

Treviranus is a world expert in the field of inclusive design and has made appearances at the White House and United Nations. Concerned about the impact of statistical reasoning on people who happen to be outliers or different from the statistical norm, and the amplification, acceleration and automation of the harms by machine learning that make decisions using statistical processing of past data, she has "led many international multi‐partner research networks that have created broadly implemented technical innovations that support inclusion". Her work has included designing open source content and helping to implement accessibility legislation, standards and specifications. Treviranus was recognized for her work in Inclusive Artificial Intelligence (AI) by Women in AI with the AI for Good - DEI AI Leader of the Year award . In 2013, the Governor General of Canada awarded Treviranus the Queen's Diamond Jubilee Medal. ZoomerMedia chose Treviranus as one of Canada's Top 45 over 45s in 2012.

== Career and education ==
Treviranus graduated from University of Toronto in 1981 with a B.Sc. in occupational therapy. In 1994, she earned a M.A. in special education from University of Toronto and in 2018 earned her Ph.D from University College Dublin, Ireland.

At the beginning of her career, for the first personal computers – the Apple II Plus, the Tandy Model 100, the Texas Instruments computers, and later the Commodore 64 and Vic 20 – Treviranus designed alternative access systems for people with disabilities. She was assisted by experts at the University of Washington, the National Research Council Rehabilitation Technology Unit and the Microcomputer Application Program at the Hugh MacMillan Centre.

This project began while Treviranus was under contract as a tutor at McMaster University in the Faculty of Health Sciences to integrate 12 students with disabilities into McMaster in compliance with Bill 82, the Ontario Education Act by the Education Amendment Act, 1980, which states that "the responsibility of school boards to provide (or to agree with another board to provide) in accordance with the regulations, special education programs and special education services for their exceptional pupils". The McMaster experience "was a pivotal moment for Treviranus and inspired her work with people with disabilities (PWDs) and in the field of Inclusive Design".

In 1994, Treviranus founded the Adaptive Technology Resource Centre (ATRC) at the University of Toronto. Her first major research project was in collaboration with SoftQuad and Yuri Rubinsky, funded by Canarie. The goal of the project was to embed accessibility support, in the form of an on-screen "visual dynamic keyboard" that offered various text-entry methods, into HoTMeTaL, an early HTML editor. This in part, with Mike Paciello's help, led to the formation of the Web Accessibility Initiative of the W3C. (Note: Daniel Dadeiller alludes to this in his WAI early days account at https://www.w3.org/WAI/history.)

Treviranus moved the ATRC to OCAD University in 2010 and rebranded it as the IDRC. "She has played a leading role in developing accessibility legislation, standards and specifications internationally (including WAI ATAG, IMS AccessForAll, ISO 24751, and AODA Information and Communication)".

In 2000, Treviranus was a chief expert witness in Maguire v SOCOG 2000, an Australian human rights case regarding the inaccessibility of the Sydney Olympics. Bruce Maguire won the case leading to changes in accessibility requirements at international games. As a result of this case, the Australian government made the decision to require its agencies to employ W3C guidelines.

In 2007, Treviranus was an expert witness in the Donna Jodhan Canadian Supreme Court case whose verdict compelled the Canadian Government to make all of its websites accessible.

As the founder of the IDRC and the IDI, one of the areas that Treviranus focuses her efforts on is making the internet accessible through research on assistive tools such as screen readers, touch pads and joysticks. Treviranus’s research has been used by the Government of Ontario Diversity Office as well as by the United Nations to create disability policy such as the Convention on the Rights of Persons with Disabilities. Her work is the focal point of a feasibility study by the United States Department of Education on accessibility.

As a university professor, she established a new Master of Design in Inclusive Design (MDes INCD) programme at OCAD University in 2010. The MDes INCD programme teaches the fundamentals of Inclusive Design. "Part of the reason I came to OCADU was because there was the opportunity to start a new graduate program." What is unique about the MDes INCD programme is that the students in the programme are selected for their diversity – from a very wide range of interests and expertise.

In 2012 Treviranus cofounded the annual Designing Enabling Economies and Policies (DEEP) Conference to "engage in substantive in-depth discussion about implementation strategies for digital inclusion of persons with disabilities among decision makers promoting the Convention on the Rights of Persons with Disabilities in their respective countries; To identify levers and innovative approaches that go beyond current strategies."

Treviranus is the lead project editor of the ISO 24751 standard, ISO/IEC JTC 1/SC 36, which supports automatic matching of user accessibility needs with digital resources and user interface configurations. Jutta Treviranus chairs the Authoring Tool Accessibility Guidelines Working Group (AUWG) of the World Wide Web Consortium (W3C) Web Accessibility Initiative.

=== Current appointments ===
Jutta Treviranus, as well as working as a full professor in the Faculty of Design at OCAD University, is Graduate Program Director in the Inclusive Design Graduate Program. She is also Director of the Inclusive Design Research Centre at OCAD University. She is Principal Investigator, Inclusive Design Institute (a regional research hub with eight postsecondary institutions as partners). She is the Chair, Web Access Initiative, W3C, Authoring Tools. Treviranus is the Canadian Head of Delegation of the ISO JTC1 SC36 working group and Co-Director of Raising the Floor International.

== Research areas ==
=== Inclusive Design ===
Treviranus is a leader in the field of inclusive design and has articulated a guiding framework for Inclusive Design in a digitally transformed and complexly connected global society. The framework applies Systems Thinking to the area of digital inclusion for people experiencing disabilities and adds the consideration of the design process to inclusive or accessible Design.

=== Inclusive education ===
Jutta Treviranus has written extensively on Inclusive Education. "We need to design these systems, and our policies, so that they are accessible to everyone," Treviranus wrote.

==== Policy development and policy analysis ====
Treviranus has written that an information model is required so that education delivered by web based systems can be tailored to the specific needs of each student. Because information devices and delivery systems are so easy to change, and are flexible, that allows for infinite permutations so that obstacles faced by disabled students can be overcome. Further, Treviranus asserts that when educational resources are shared that further enhances an education system's ability to provide a match for each student's needs. An embodiment of these ideals is the open educational resources (OER) community since it has the potential to rectify several of the flaws of traditional education. One way to stop OERs from experiencing the same problems as traditional education is to embrace imperfection. She notes that another risk to inclusive education is the overuse of the big data statistical analysis which can be used to justify non-inclusion.

==== PEBBLES ====
PEBBLES (Providing Education By Bringing Learning Environments to Students) is a project funded and supported by Wayne Gretzky in the late 1990s, and several other funders. "Through the use of videoconferencing and robotics, the Pebbles Project is able to connect a hospitalized child with his or her classroom in order to minimize loss of social and intellectual stimulation and to facilitate reentry into the classroom after hospital discharge." According to Time magazine, "the robots, created by Toronto-based Telbotics, work in pairs. One with a 15-in. LCD screen for a face goes to school in the absent child's place. The other remains in the hospital, transmitting an image of the child's face to the classroom. Using a video-game-style controller, the child can direct the school robot to raise its hand to ask a question or swivel its head to follow the teacher."

Treviranus et alia noted that, "The results indicate that, overall, PEBBLES has a very positive effect on both the young and adult participants; the most dramatic effect of all was on the ill child who used PEBBLES to attend school." Treviranus has been involved with computer technology, robotics and learning from the very beginning.

==== e-Learning ====
Treviranus has argued that the outliers in any society are frequently the true innovators. She writes that educating these people through electronic means (e-learning) makes very good sense, especially because this group may contain the shy, the gifted or sensorially challenged – plus, marginalization largely depends on context. Another observation that Treviranus makes is that by breaking down digital barriers and therefore making education more inclusive has advantages for all learners, including non-PWDs, such as causing the learning environment to become much more open, fluid and accepting of individual talents and interests. Taking further the abstract notion of serving individual learners, Treviranus discusses an accessibility strategy called Access For All that hones in on the need for accessible automated systems to collect resources and spread this network globally.

==== Inclusive digital education techniques ====
Problem: much education disseminated over long or short distances, but not in a physical classroom, lacks some, or all of the educational modalities required by a very large of group of students with disabilities, namely, for the blind or learning disabled, ways of receiving information by touch, (the somatosensory system), and /or tactile manipulation, for example. To arrive at, perhaps, a potential solution/direction of a solution, to the problem, Treviranus conducted research that examined the understanding of spatial ideas like geography by using a number of non-visual techniques: haptics (haptic technology, haptic communication, haptic perception, haptic poetry, and haptic media), 3D real world sounds and talking to figure out the best ways to communicate various kinds of data.

=== Inclusive computer technology and inclusive internet ===
==== Public policy ====
In the context of an ever increasingly digital economy, and the requirement/tendency to combine technology of all sorts into everyday life, there is a potential problem for even larger numbers of people to become marginalized since accessible technology only meets the needs of a few, be it at a very high cost, and this accessible technology is frequently not compatible with newer technology – and, so destined to fail. A public policy response to this is the creation of a Global Public Inclusive Infrastructure (GPII) that will access, by way of the cloud, a pool of resources that will marry supply and demand so that accessible technology will be automatically provided to every individual that needs it so that they will not have to justify, or bargain. GPII is a global collaboration with end-users and programmers/developers and industry players that has designed a platform, premised on the one-size-fits-one philosophy, with three major parts: firstly, a system to users to determine the best interface for them, located in the cloud; secondly, a way to cause all digital interfaces they come across to adapt to their needs instead of vice versa; and, thirdly, provide the data and digital design and programming techniques for both mainstream and assistive technology developers more economically efficiently.

Treviranus has observed that human-computer interaction (HCI) researchers working on projects such as GPII are more than ever impacted by public policy considerations from not only government bodies but also from both the corporate world and NGOs, for example organizations that set standards such as the ISO group.

Another public policy notion that Treviranus describes is the curb-cut phenomenon that envisions how the new technology and other modes of accommodating PWDs will be scaled up and used to economically benefit the broader majority – not only PWDs.

==== Tools and approaches ====
As early as 1992, Treviranus had begun working in the field of Inclusive Design. In, 'An Overview of Human-computer Interaction Techniques for People with Physical Disabilities,' Treviranus and her team stressed that being able to have physical contact with computers is of essential importance for people with disabilities; they researched a large array of cutting edge technological solutions that allowed users with a variety of physical impairments to use and interact with computer technology. The paper anticipates changing input devices like keyboards and mice to technology involving switches to allow for the physical difficulties of users.

Developing from the notion that the disabled require interaction with technology, Treviranus goes on to postulate that the alternative technological techniques that are being developed to be used with computers be as easy to use as the control mechanisms they replace such as speech or touch-typing for example. This idea is further developed with suggestion that computer interfaces fit each individual user no matter where they encounter the interface – from public workstation to online learning environments.

For the Web Accessibility Initiative, in 1999, Treviranus co-edited Authoring Tool Accessibility Guidelines. This text helped web developers to, firstly, design authoring tools that create web content that is accessible and, as well, secondly, to help them to design accessible authoring tool user interfaces. By 2008, Treviranus was able to outline how important authoring tools are to the process of creating accessible websites. By using tools that adhere to the standards established by the W3C Authoring Tool Accessibility Guidelines (ATAG), developers of websites who are not familiar with accessibility concerns, or who are not enthusiastic about helping people with disabilities, end up producing accessible sites because the tools they are using are pre-set to create accessible content by default.

To further understand the need for accessible technology, for example, Treviranus describes the adaptation and substitution of ordinary input mechanisms like keyboards and mice with switches that allow the physically disabled to have access to digital technology.

== Selected works ==
=== Peer-reviewed journals ===
- Vanderheiden, G. C., Treviranus, J., & Chourasia, A. (2013, October). The global public inclusive infrastructure (GPII). In Proceedings of the 15th International ACM SIGACCESS Conference on Computers and Accessibility (p. 70). ACM.
- Vanderheiden, G. C., Treviranus, J., Gemou, M., Bekiaris, E., Markus, K., Clark, C., & Basman, A. (2013). The evolving global public inclusive infrastructure (GPII). In Universal access in human-computer interaction. Design methods, tools, and interaction techniques for eInclusion (pp. 107–116). Springer Berlin Heidelberg.
- Vanderheiden, G., & Treviranus, J. (2011). Creating a global public inclusive infrastructure. In Universal Access in Human-Computer Interaction. Design for All and eInclusion (pp. 517–526). Springer Berlin Heidelberg.
- Nevile, L., Cooper, M., Heath, A., Rothbergeine, M., & Treviranus, J. (2005). Learner-centred accessibility for interoperable web-based educational systems.
- Weiss, P. L. T., Whiteley, C. P., Treviranus, J., & Fels, D. I. (2001). PEBBLES: a personal technology for meeting educational, social and emotional needs of hospitalised children. Personal and Ubiquitous Computing, 5(3), 157-168.
- Treviranus, J. (2014) The Value of the Statistically Insignificant. Educause Review, January/ February 2014: 46-47
- Lewis, L., Treviranus, J. (2013): Public policy and the global public inclusive infrastructure project. Interactions 20(5): 62-66.
- Treviranus, J., & Hockema, S.A. (2009). The Value of the Unpopular: Counteracting the Popularity Echo-Chamber on the Web. In Proceedings of the 2009 IEEE Toronto International Conference—Science and Technology for Humanity, SED 6: Symposium on Education and Social Implications of Technology, Toronto, ON.
- Weiss T., Whiteley C., Treviranus, J., and Fels, D.I. (2000). PEBBLES: A personal technology for meeting educational, social and emotional needs of hospitalized children. Personal Technologies.
- Fels, D.I., Williams, L., Smith, G., Treviranus, J., & Eagleson, R. (1999). Developing a video-mediated communication system for hospitalized children. Telemedicine Journal. 5(2). 193-207.
- Williams, L., Fels, D. I., Smith, G., Treviranus, J., Eagleson, R. (2002). Control of a remote communication system by children. International Journal of Industrial Ergonomics.
- Treviranus, J. (1994). Mastering Alternative Computer Access: The role of understanding, trust and automaticity. Assistive Technology: the official journal of RESNA, 6(1), 26-42.
- Treviranus, J. (1994). Virtual Reality Technology and People with Disabilities. Presence: Teleoperators and Virtual Environments. MIT Press. 3(3),201-208.
- Treviranus, J. (1993). The many views of Jane. In A Glimpse of Disabilities and Empowerment. P. Lindsay, I. Davidson and J. Light eds. Toronto: Sharing to Learn, 173-201.
- Shein, F., Treviranus, J., Brownlow, N. D., Milner, M., & Parnes, P. (1992). Human-Computer Interaction by People with Physical Disabilities. International Journal of Industrial Ergonomics, 9(2), 171-181.
- Nantais, T., Shein, F. & Treviranus, J. (1994). A predictive selection technique for single-digit typing with a visual keyboard. IEEE Transactions on Rehabilitation Engineering, 2(3), 130–136.

=== Reports ===
- Kemper, A., Stolarick, K., Milway, J., Treviranus, J., (2010) Releasing Constraints: Projecting the Economic Impacts of Increased Accessibility in Ontario. Martin Prosperity Institute.
- Treviranus, J., Richards, J., Silva, J., Mobile, (2011) "Wireless Handset Accessibility Assessment." CRTC.
- Treviranus, J., Stolarick, K., Densted, M., Fichten, C., Ascunsion, J., (2011) "Leveraging Inclusion and Diversity as Canada’s Digital Advantage." SSHRC.
- Treviranus, J. (2009) "You Say Tomato, I Say Tomato, Let’s Not Call the Whole Thing Off "in On the Horizon. Emerald Group Publishing Limited.

=== Book chapters (since 1990) ===
- Nantais, T., Shein, F., and Treviranus, J. (1993). A Predictive Selection Technique for Single-Digit Typists. IEEE Transactions on Rehabilitation Engineering, in print.
- Shafrir, U., Etkind, M., Treviranus, J. (2006). ELearning Tools for EPortfolios in Handbook of Research on EPortfolios. Editors Ali Jafari, Catherine Kaufman. IDEA Group Reference.
- Treviranus, J. (2008), "Authoring Tools," in Web Accessibility: A Foundation for Research..Editors: Yeliz Yesilada and Simon Harper. Springer, Hamburg
- Treviranus, J. & Roberts, V. (2007), "Disability, Special Education and IT "in International Handbook of Information Technology in Primary and Secondary Education. Editors: J.M. Voogt, G. Knezek. Springer, Hamburg.
- Treviranus, J. & Roberts, V. (2006), Inclusive E-learning in International Handbook of Virtual Learning Environment. Editors: Joel Weiss, Jason Nolan, Peter Trifonas, Kluwar, Springer, Hamburg.
- Brewer, J., Treviranus, J., (2003), "Developing and Reusing Accessible Content and Applications" in Reusing Resources for Networked Learning, Allison Littlejohn editor, Routledge Press, London, UK.
- Treviranus, J., Roberts, V., (2003). "Supporting competent motor control of AAC systems"in Communicative Competence, David Beukelman, Joe Reichle editors, Brookes Publishing.
- Treviranus, J., Petty, L., 2001, Computer Access, in Manual of Assistive Technology. Mosby, Chicago.
- Treviranus, J. and Serflek, C., "Virtual Reality Technologies and People with Disabilities," Encyclopedia of Microcomputers, vol. 19, Marcel Dekker, Inc. New York 1997
- Vanderheiden, G., Treviranus, J., Gemou, M., Bekiaris, E., Markus, K., Clark, C., Basman, A. (2013). The Evolving Global Public Inclusive Infrastructure (GPII). HCI(6) 2013: 1-7-116.
- Ayotte, D; Vass, J; Mitchell, J; Treviranus, J (2014). "Personalizing Interfaces Using an Inclusive Design Approach". Universal Access in Human-Computer Interaction. Design and Development Methods for Universal Access. Lecture Notes in Computer Science. Vol. 8513. Springer International Publishing. pp. 191–202. doi:10.1007/978-3-319-07437-5_19. ISBN 978-3-319-07436-8.
- Peissner, M; Vanderheiden, G. C; Treviranus, J; Tsakou, G (2014). "Prosperity4All–Setting the Stage for a Paradigm Shift in eInclusion". Universal Access in Human-Computer Interaction. Design for All and Accessibility Practice. Lecture Notes in Computer Science. Vol. 8516. Springer International Publishing. pp. 443–452. doi:10.1007/978-3-319-07509-9_42. ISBN 978-3-319-07508-2. S2CID 29244399.
- Cheetham, A; Ayotte, D; Clark, C; Mitchell, J; Treviranus, J (2014). "Accessible Metadata Generation". Universal Access in Human-Computer Interaction. Universal Access to Information and Knowledge. Lecture Notes in Computer Science. Vol. 8514. Springer International Publishing. pp. 101–110. doi:10.1007/978-3-319-07440-5_10. ISBN 978-3-319-07439-9. S2CID 30284422.
- Schwerdtfeger, R., Vanderheiden, G. C., Treviranus, J., Clark, C., Mitchell, J., Petrides, L., ... & Brennan, M. (2014). PGA: Preferences for Global Access. In Universal Access in Human-Computer Interaction. Design for All and Accessibility Practice (pp. 325–336). Springer International Publishing.
- Treviranus, J; Clark, C; Mitchell, J; Vanderheiden, G. C (2014). "Prosperity4All–Designing a Multi-Stakeholder Network for Economic Inclusion". Universal Access in Human-Computer Interaction. Design for All and Accessibility Practice. Lecture Notes in Computer Science. Vol. 8516. Springer International Publishing. pp. 453–461. doi:10.1007/978-3-319-07509-9_43. ISBN 978-3-319-07508-2. S2CID 22571308.
- Treviranus, J; Mitchell, J; Clark, C; Roberts, V (2014). "An Introduction to the FLOE Project". Universal Access in Human-Computer Interaction. Universal Access to Information and Knowledge. Lecture Notes in Computer Science. Vol. 8514. Springer International Publishing. pp. 454–465. doi:10.1007/978-3-319-07440-5_42. ISBN 978-3-319-07439-9. S2CID 6721340.
- Vanderheiden, G. C; Treviranus, J; Ortega-Moral, M; Peissner, M; de Lera, E (2014). "Creating a Global Public Inclusive Infrastructure (GPII)". Universal Access in Human-Computer Interaction. Design for All and Accessibility Practice. Lecture Notes in Computer Science. Vol. 8516. Springer International Publishing. pp. 506–515. doi:10.1007/978-3-319-07509-9_48. ISBN 978-3-319-07508-2. S2CID 37316448.
- Zervas, P., Kardaras, V., Baldiris, S., Bacca, J., Avila, C., Politis, Y., Treviranus, J. & Sampson, D. G. (2014). Supporting Open Access to Teaching and Learning of People with Disabilities. In Digital Systems for Open Access to Formal and Informal Learning (pp. 57–68). Springer International Publishing.

=== Conference proceedings ===
- Treviranus, J. (2010). The Value of Imperfection: the Wabi-Sabi Principle in Aesthetics and Learning. In Open ED 2010 Proceedings. Barcelona: UOC, OU, BYU. [Accessed: 10/1/2011].< http://hdl.handle.net/10609/4869>
- Treviranus, J. (1997, April). Nimble Document Navigation Using Alternative Access Tools, Sixth International World Wide Web Conference, Santa Clara, CA.

== Awards and distinctions ==
- 1995 RESNA Pin Dot Outstanding Paper Award, for paper entitled "Mastering Alternative Computer Access: The Role of Understanding, Trust and Automaticity"
- 1997 WWW6 Award for best paper in access track
- 1998 American Foundation for the Blind, Access Award, with SoftQuad
- 1999 Global Bangemann Challenge Finalist for PEBBLES, with Deb Fels, Ryerson and Graham Smith, Telbotics
- 1999 Cited in United Nations Global Vision Award, awarded to Australia, for role as expert witness in recent human rights trials involving World Wide Web access
- 2003 Trophées du Libre, awarded to ATRC for development of GOK
- Canarie IWAY Award Honorable Mention
- 2005 Dr. Dayton M. Forman Memorial Award
- Canadian Finalist in E-inclusion category for World Summit Awards (for Aprompt)
- 2007 and 2008 IBM Faculty Award
- 2009 IEEE TIC-STH 2009 Best Paper Award for paper entitled "The Value of the Unpopular"
- 2012 Canada’s Top 45 over 45, ZoomerMedia, Recognizing Canadians who have made a difference to Canada
- 2013 International Electrotechnical Commission (IEC) 1906 Award
- 2013 The Queen Elizabeth II Diamond Jubilee Medal
- 2014 Lieutenant Governor’s Community Volunteer Award
- 2022 Women in AI Awards: AI for Good - DEI AI Leader of the Year

== Advisory roles ==
- Expert Member, United Nations Department of Economic and Social Affairs
- Member, Advisory Board, Canadian Human Rights Museum
- Member, Accessibility for Ontarians with Disabilities Act, (AODA), Advisory Council
- Co-director, Raising the Floor International
- Board member, Broadcast Accessibility Fund (2012-)
- Board member, Sakai Foundation (2007-2011)
- Board member Lights, Camera Access! (2008-2010)
- Board member OpenCast (2009-2010)
- Board member CollectionSpace (2008-)
- Board member Decapod (2008-)
- Board Chair Fluid Engage (2008-)
- Board Chair Fluid (2006-)
- Project Editor, ISO/IEC JTC1 SC36 on Education Learning and Training
- IMS Global Learning Consortium – Accessibility Working group
- Chair W3C ATAG (Authoring Tool Accessibility Guidelines)
- W3C WAI (Web Accessibility Initiative) Coordination group member
- Access to Academic Materials for Print-Disabled Post-Secondary Students: A Partnership of Users and Service Providers, NEADS, Steering Committee
- Eduspecs, Industry Canada, Canadian E-learning specifications panel
- Pathways and Clusters Consulting Expert, HRDC
- Spectrum Advisory Panel on Common Look and Feel, Industry Canada
- Treasury Board Secretariat, Consultant on Inclusive Information Architecture and the Federated Architecture
- Advisor on Accessibility, MIT Physics Dept., Distance Education Project
- Advisor, PEARL Project, Open University, UK
- Member, Trace Centre, Advisory Panel, University of Wisconsin
- Member, Texas Task Force on Accessible Textbooks
- Expert Witness, Australian Human Rights Commission
- Canadian Radio-television and Telecommunications Commission expert witness and technical expert Accessibility hearings Net Neutrality hearings
- Expert Witness Canadian Charter of Rights and Freedoms Challenge
- EU4All advisory panel
- OECD consultant to Industry Canada Minister – OECD meetings in Korea (preparation of briefing and resolutions)
- AODA, Minister's Advisory Committee (Information and Communication Standard)
- UNESCO workshop on Open Education Accessibility expert member
