= XMetaL =

XML editor software

XMetaL Author

- Developer: JustSystems
- Stable release: 20.0
- Operating system: Microsoft Windows
- Available in: English, Japanese
- Type: XML editor
- License: Proprietary
- Website: http://www.xmetal.com

XMetaL, or XMetaL Author, is a software application people use to create and edit documents in XML and SGML. It has some features common to word processors, but is a native XML editor that can be configured to work with various standard and custom DTDs and XML Schemas. XMetaL was first released by SoftQuad Software in 1999 and is currently developed by JustSystems.

== Uses ==
XMetaL has a user interface resembling a word processor, in contrast with other XML editors such as XMLSpy that are designed for XML programmers. XMetaL is used by both technical and non-technical writers, most often to develop technical documents, website content, newspaper and magazine content, and organizational policies and procedures. Government agencies also use XMetaL for tracking legislation.

== Features ==
XMetaL includes features common to word processors, such as a spellchecker, a thesaurus, and the ability to track changes made to documents. XMetaL provides different views of a document, known as “Normal”, “Tags On” and “Plain Text,” which reveal the underlying element tags and other XML markup to varying degrees, and uses standard CSS files to style documents for display within the editor. A “Resource Manager” pane can be used to locate and insert items such as image files and frequently reused text fragments.

XMetaL can be configured to work with standard or custom DTDs or XML Schemas (XSDs). Once configured, the user interface displays options for inserting elements and attributes declared in the DTD or XSD, and ensures all changes to documents are valid according to the rules of the DTD or XSD. Developers can also associate menu items and toolbar buttons for editing images, tables, and lists with elements and attributes in the particular DTD or XSD.

Through a macro facility, developers can add custom dialog boxes, menu commands, toolbar buttons, forms, and behaviors, using languages supported by the Microsoft scripting environment such as JScript and VBScript. It also includes interfaces for COM and Java. XMetaL includes features to import content from a database into an XML document, and can be integrated with other systems via APIs. XMetaL works with a variety of content management systems.

The “Enterprise” version of XMetaL includes the Darwin Information Typing Architecture (DITA) DTDs and features for editing and publishing DITA topics and maps.

== Thin-client version ==
XMAX, a platform for creating thin client custom XML editors, was first released in 2003 under the name “XMetaL for ActiveX”. XMAX-based applications can run within the Internet Explorer browser for Windows, and can be embedded in other applications that support ActiveX.

== History ==
XMetaL was first developed by SoftQuad Software, which had previously developed the HTML editor HoTMetaL and the SGML editor Author-Editor. XMetaL 1.0, released in June 1999, was the first stand-alone XML editor to offer a word-processor-like user interface. In 2002, the Ottawa-based Corel Corporation bought SoftQuad, but failed to successfully develop the business. In 2003, XMetaL was rebranded as "XMetaL Author", as some features for extending and customizing the product were separated into a "XMetaL Developer" application.

In 2004, Corel sold the XMetaL business to Blast Radius, a company based in Vancouver, which was still home to most members of the original XMetaL development team. Critique, a product that had been developed by Blast Radius for collaborative reviewing of XML documents, would later be rebranded as "XMetaL Reviewer". XMetaL was the first major XML editor to provide specific features for DITA. In 2006, Japan-based JustSystems Corporation acquired the XMetaL business from Blast Radius, keeping the XMetaL development team based in Vancouver.
