= .sgm =

.sgm may refer to the following file formats:

- Standard Generalized Markup Language
- Encoded Archival Description Document, an XML standard for encoding archival finding aids, maintained by the Library of Congress and the Society of American Archivists
- SoftQuad XMetaL File, for the SoftQuad Software XMetaL
- Visual Boy Advance Saved State File, VisualBoyAdvance
