= Hot metal =

Hot metal may refer to:

- Hot Metal, a British television comedy series set in a newspaper office
- Hot metal typesetting
- Pig iron in a liquid state
- HoTMetaL, a pioneering HTML editor for web pages
- "Hot Metal" (Bugs), a 1995 television episode
