= ATRC =

ATRC may refer to:

- Adaptive Technology Resource Centre, a research group now known as the Inclusive Design Research Centre
- Advanced Technology Research Council
- Advanced Test Reactor Critical, a part of a nuclear reactor
- United States Alien Terrorist Removal Court, a specialized court
