= Justsystem Pittsburgh Research Center =

US research laboratory

Coordinates: 40°26′45.9″N 79°56′52.8″W

Also known as Just Research, Justsystem Pittsburgh Research Center (JPRC) was a late-1990s computer science research laboratory in Pittsburgh, loosely associated with Carnegie Mellon University. Its director was Dr. Scott Fahlman.

During its relatively brief existence, from May 1996 to July 2000, JPRC performed work in machine vision, text classification and summarization, programming environments and user interface design.

Just Research researchers included:

- Dr Vibhu Mittal
- Dr Andrew McCallum
- Mr Mark Kantrowitz
- Dr Mikako Harada
- Mr Paul Gleichauf
- Dr Rahul Sukthankar
- Dr Michael Witbrock
- Mr Antoine Brusseau
- Dr Shumeet Baluja
- Mr Michael Gillinov
- Mrs Keiko Hasegawa
- Dr Dayne Freitag
- Dr Rich Caruana
- Dr David "Pablo" Cohn

== See also ==
- JustSystems
