= OCAD University =

Public art university in Toronto, Canada

Ontario College of Art and Design University
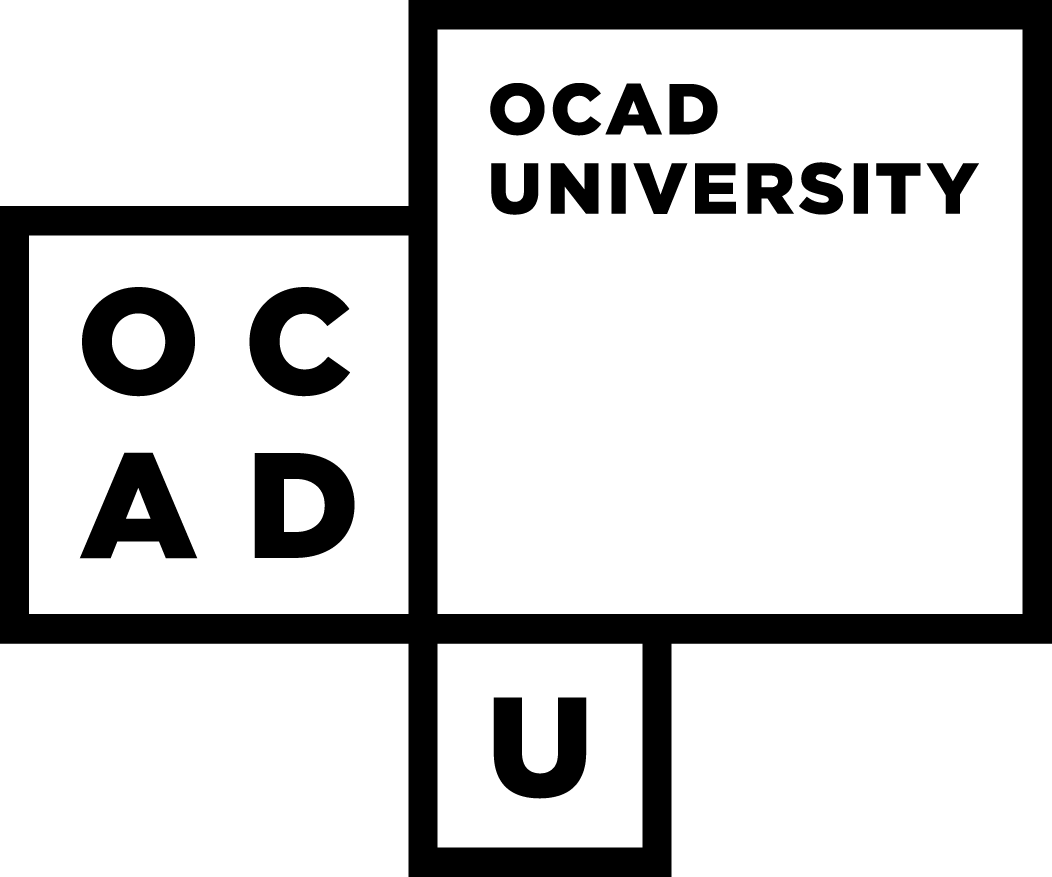
- Logo of the university
- Other name: OCAD University
- Former names: Ontario School of Art (1876–86); Toronto Art School (1886–90); Central Ontario School of Art and Industrial Design (1890–1912); Ontario College of Art (1912–96); Ontario College of Art & Design (1996–2010)
- Type: Public university
- Established: 4 April 1876; 150 years ago (Note: The motion to establish the institution was passed on 4 April 1876, with the institution holding its first class later that year in October.)
- Affiliations: AICAD, COU, Universities Canada
- Endowment: C$23.6 million (2025)
- Chancellor: Jamie Watt
- President: Ana Serrano
- Provost: Caroline Langill
- Faculty: 480
- Students: 4,970 (2025) (Note: The following figure only includes undergraduate and graduate students, and does not include students enrolled in the university's continuing education courses.)
- Undergraduates: 4,670 (2025)
- Postgraduates: 300 (2025)
- Location: Toronto, Ontario, Canada; 43°39′11″N 79°23′28.3″W
- Campus: Urban
- Website: www.ocadu.ca

The Ontario College of Art and Design University, branded as OCAD University or OCAD U (OH-kad), is a public art university in Toronto, Ontario, Canada. Its main campus is located within Toronto's Grange Park and Entertainment District neighbourhoods.

The university is co-educational and operates three academic faculties – the Faculty of Art, the Faculty of Arts and Science, and the Faculty of Design – which offer programs at the undergraduate and graduate levels, as well as certificate programs and continuing education courses. The university is one of four members of the Association of Independent Colleges of Art and Design located outside the United States.

Established by the Ontario Society of Artists in 1876 as the Ontario School of Art, it is the oldest operating school in Canada dedicated to art and design education. The school was renamed twice in 1886 and 1890 before it was provincially chartered under its new name, the Ontario College of Art (OCA), in 1912. With the inception of the college's design department in 1945, the OCA grew and later became the Ontario College of Art and Design (OCAD) in 1996. In 2010, the institution formally adopted its current title, including the university designation in its name to reflect its maturation and change in degree-granting powers.

In 2025, there were 4,670 undergraduates and 300 graduate students enrolled at the university. As of 2026, the university holds an association of over 27,000 alumni.

== History ==
=== Early history ===
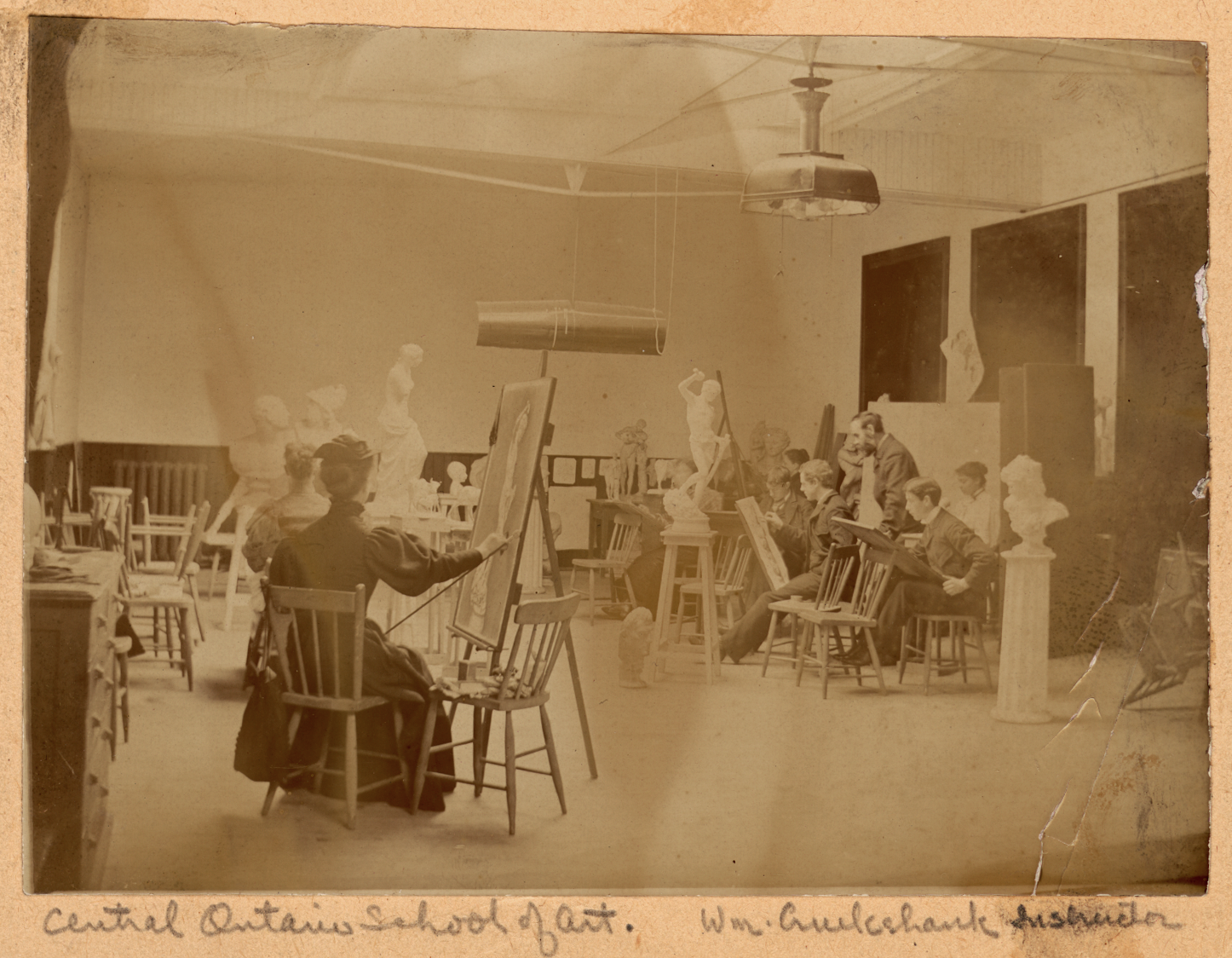
Inside the Central Ontario School of Art and Industrial Design in the late 19th century. William Cruikshank, an instructor at the school, is pictured in the background.

The institution was founded in 1876 by the Ontario Society of Artists with the objective to provide professional artistic training while furthering the development of art education in Ontario. (Note: "... such a school is among the objectives listed in the Society’s constitution of 1875 and,... among the objects proposed at the founding of that Society in 1872." (p. 11)) On 4 April 1876, the Ontario Society of Artists passed the motion to "draw up a scheme" for a school of art, which later led to its creation on 30 October 1876, funded by a government grant of $1,000. The Ontario School of Art initially opened at 14 King Street West with a class of 14 students, headed by artist Thomas Mower Martin as the founding director, a position he held for the next three years. Fellow artists Robert Harris and William Cruikshank also joined the school, the latter serving as the school's president from 1884 to 1886.

In 1882, the Ontario Department of Education assumed control over the school and transferred it to the Toronto Normal School. In 1886, the school was relocated to a building near Queen Street and Yonge Street and was renamed the Toronto Art School.

When the Ontario Society of Artists resumed sponsorship of the school in 1890, they renamed it the Central Ontario School of Art and Industrial Design and reopened it at the Princess Theatre, which also shared its premises with the Art Museum of Toronto (now the Art Gallery of Ontario).

=== 20th century ===
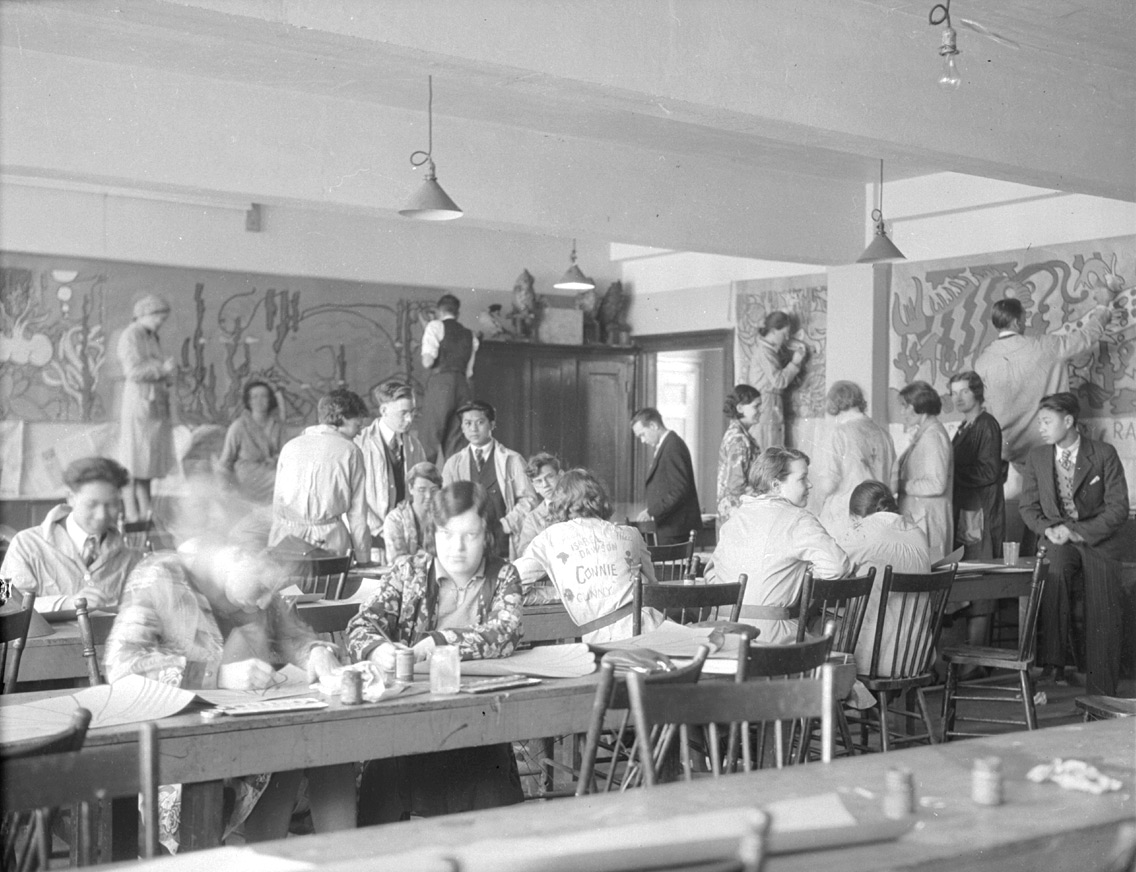
Inside a class at the Ontario College of Art in 1931.

In 1910, the school was again relocated, occupying 1 College Street as a result of the Princess Theatre's demolition. Two years later, the school was granted a charter by the Ontario government that authorized it to issue diplomas. The institution was incorporated as the Ontario College of Art with George Agnew Reid named as its first principal. Reid designed the first building owned by the college, which was also the first building in Canada built specifically for the education of artists and designers. The college moved, for the last time, to the new permanent property in 1921, which is still in use today.

As a part of Reid's wider efforts to have visual arts accepted as part of the province's formal education system, Reid pushed for the OCA to potentially become a constituent college of the University of Toronto; however, the proposed amalgamation was never pursued.

In 1945, the OCA established a design school, broadening its education mandate. By the 1950s, the college had expanded beyond its downtown campus, operating classes in Port Hope, Ontario and at William Houston Public School in midtown Toronto (today part of York University's Glendon Campus). In 1957, the college's main campus received its first physical extension, which has since abutted the eastern side of the original schoolhouse. Three more expansions to the new building were followed in different years, which were 1963, 1967, and 1981 in response to increasing student enrolment.

Roy Ascott, who became OCA's former president from 1971 to 1972, radically challenged the structure of the college's curriculum. The overhaul of the college's curriculum put forward by Ascott anticipated future developments in art pedagogy but polarized the community at the time, hastening his departure from the college. In 1974, the institution launched its Florence foreign exchange program, which allowed students to study in Florence, Italy inside a dedicated building with studio spaces. The program was staffed by faculty members until the program was discontinued in 2017.

From 1979 to 1997, OCA also held classes at the Stewart Building, a building located north of the main campus at 149 College Street.

The institution remained the Ontario College of Art until 1996 when it was reorganized as the Ontario College of Art and Design, a change intended to recognize its inclusion of design education, raise its media and industry profile, as well as better position it for a transition from a diploma- to a degree-granting body. In the following year, the college entered into a partnership with the U.K.–based Open University to provide students the opportunity to obtain an Open University undergraduate degree.

=== 21st century ===
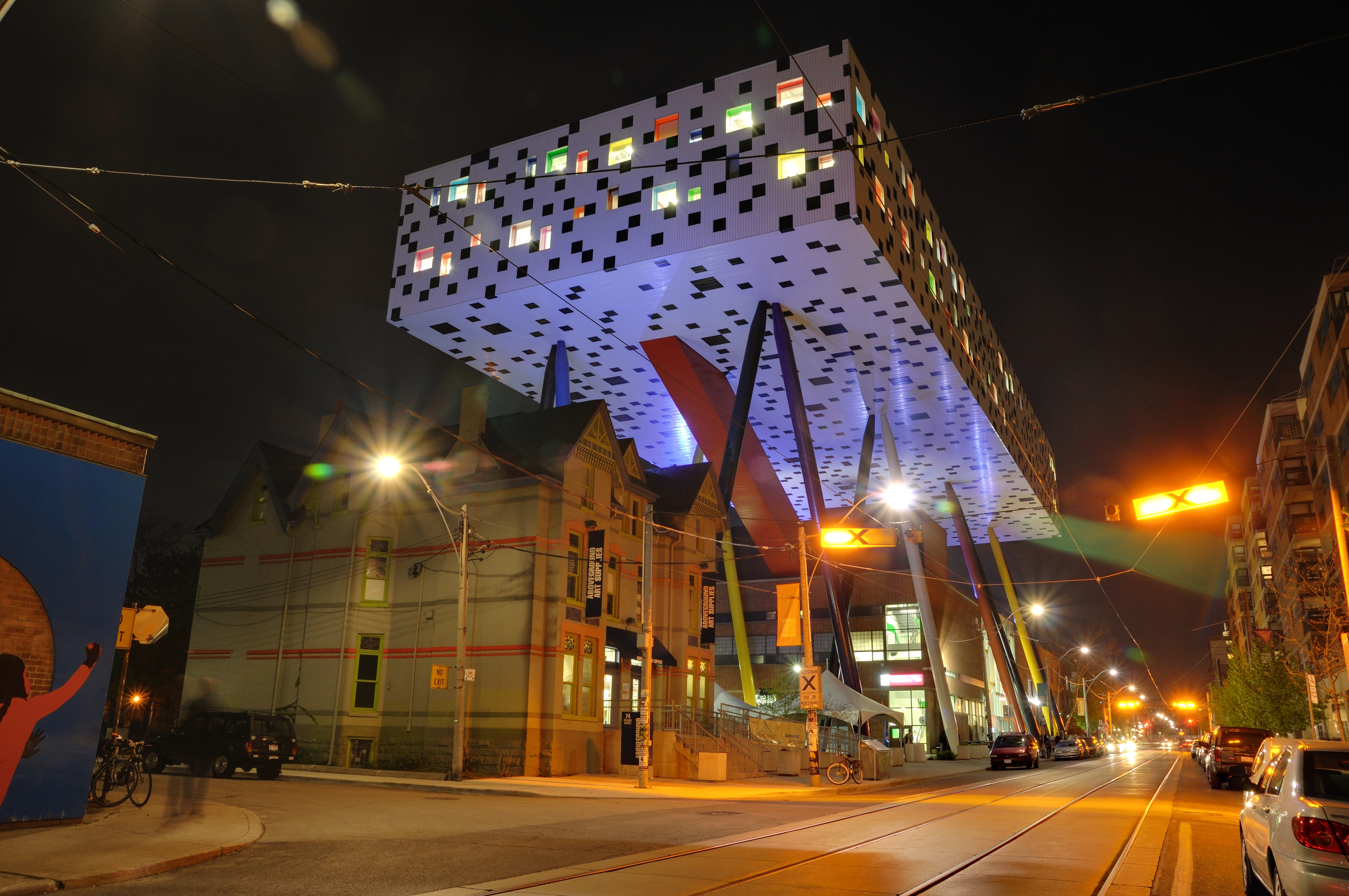
OCAD's campus in 2009, with Will Alsop's Sharp Centre for Design illuminated at night.

The advent of the 2000s marked a significant era of transformation for the college, most notably in 2000 when funding was secured from Ontario's SuperBuild infrastructure program to build a major fifth extension to the Main Building. Through Canadian architect Rod Robbie, British architect Will Alsop was made aware of the project's call for proposals, and Alsop's ambitious "table top" design was ultimately selected in 2002. A joint venture was formed between the two individuals' firms to construct the new contemporary extension, which was completed in 2004 and named the Sharp Centre for Design after its benefactors Rosalie and Isadore Sharp.

The college also underwent further changes to its internal operations whereby, in 2002, the Legislature of Ontario granted OCAD university status and the limited authority to confer bachelor's degrees in fine arts and design under its name. In 2007, authorization was extended to the conferring of graduate degrees, and the college accepted its first cohort of graduate students the next year. In 2008, the college was granted membership into the Association of Universities and Colleges of Canada, and in 2009, it began providing continuing education services to non-degree students through its School of Continuing Studies.

In the early years of Sara Diamond's tenure as president from 2005 to 2020, the institution saw a reformation of its pedagogy. Diamond emphasized academics over studio time, increasing the independence of the academic deans and requiring full-time instructors to hold a graduate or terminal degree. The curriculum was also changed to reduce the amount of classroom time versus studio time, increase the academic rigour of the college's programs, and push for digital media and design research classes. This caused some controversy as two faculty members resigned over the immense changes.

In 2010, the institution officially became the Ontario College of Art and Design University, and full degree-granting powers were subsequently awarded to the university on 1 July 2020 by the Government of Ontario, including the ability to confer its own honorary degrees.

== Campus ==
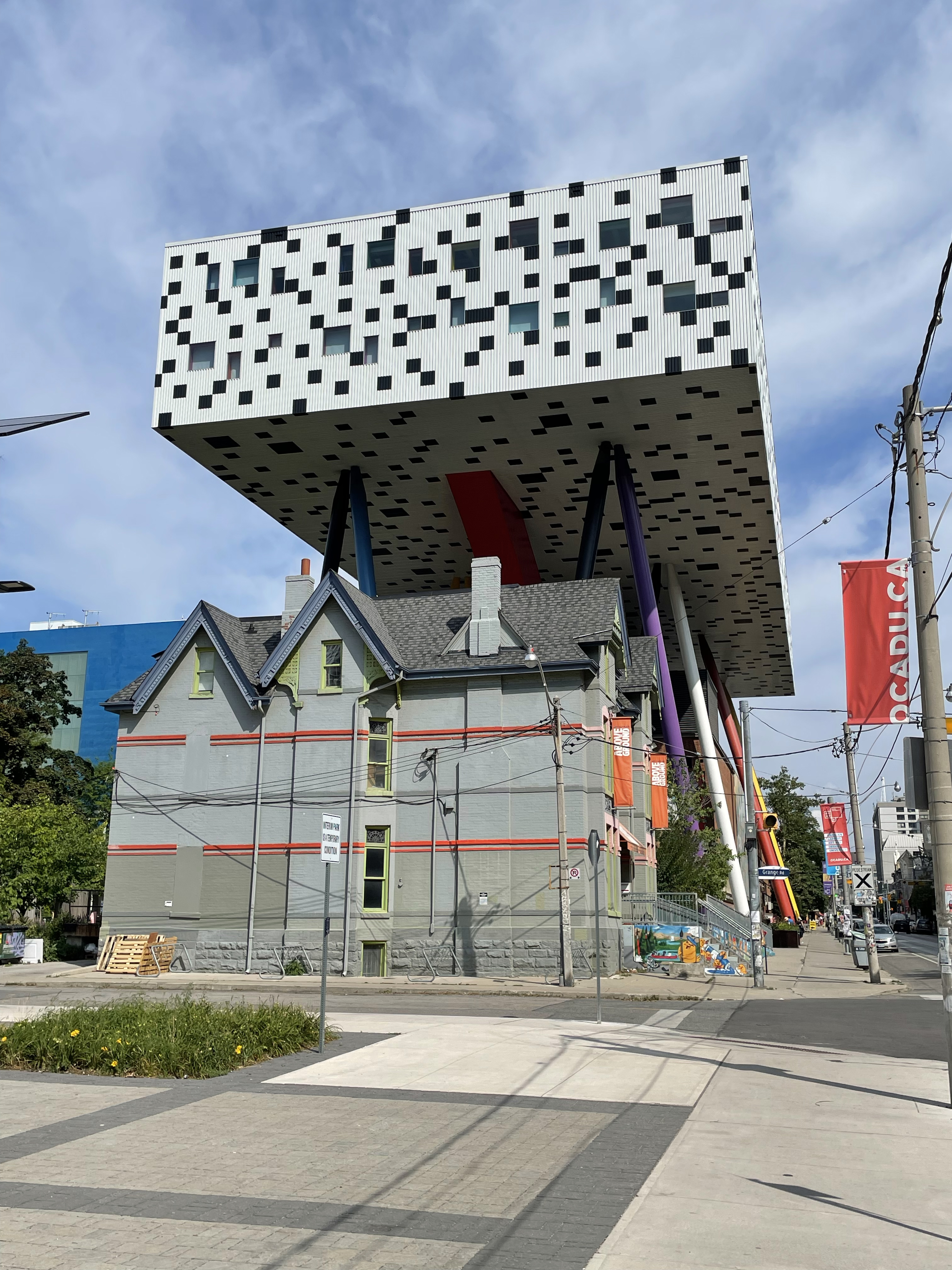
OCAD U's Main Building in the background and 74–76 McCaul Street in the foreground.

During the university’s years as a nascent institution, it had relocated to several different buildings in Toronto, many of which have been decommissioned or demolished over time. Only in the early 20th century did the school establish its own purpose-built structure, on the grounds of what is now Grange Park, a two-hectare green space that was once the front lawn of a nineteenth-century estate. As a result, the university's campus is embedded within the surrounding neighbourhoods that have developed alongside it, rather than in an enclosed area with contiguous buildings, as is wont with most other post-secondary institutions. The current campus is spread across a combination of owned, co-owned, and leased properties in Toronto’s downtown core. The largest cluster of buildings is located in the Grange Park neighbourhood along McCaul Street, between Dundas Street and Queen Street West, and comprises the Main Building (including its multiple extensions), Butterfield Park, the Annex Building, the Rosalie Sharp Pavilion, 49–51 McCaul Street, and 74–76 McCaul Street. Another group of buildings is situated south of the neighbourhood in the Entertainment District at 199, 205, and 230–240 Richmond Street West. 130 Queens Quay East in the East Bayfront is the university's "waterfront campus," which occupies 1,300 square metres (14,000 sq ft) of the building's fourth floor and forms part of a larger development called the Daniels Waterfront—City of the Arts. The campus in the Grange Park and Entertainment District precincts is accessible by public transportation via St. Patrick and Osgoode stations on Line 1, as well as the 505 Dundas and 501 Queen streetcar routes.

=== Academic buildings ===
Physically, the campus’s buildings vary in age and aesthetics, ranging from the revival architecture of the 19th century to the more contemporary design language of the present. Dating back to 1887, the oldest structures on campus are 74–76 McCaul Street, which are semi-detached Victorian houses that are not used as academic facilities, but have instead been converted into an independent art supply store for students, faculty, and the public. The George Reid Wing, the earliest component of the Main Building, was opened in 1921 and was designed by George Agnew Reid, an alumnus and principal at the then Ontario College of Art. The two-storey building is characterized by Georgian features similar to The Grange manor nearby, both of which front onto Grange Park. Under the Ontario Heritage Act, 74–76 McCaul Street and the George Reid Wing are classified as a listed and a designated heritage building, respectively.

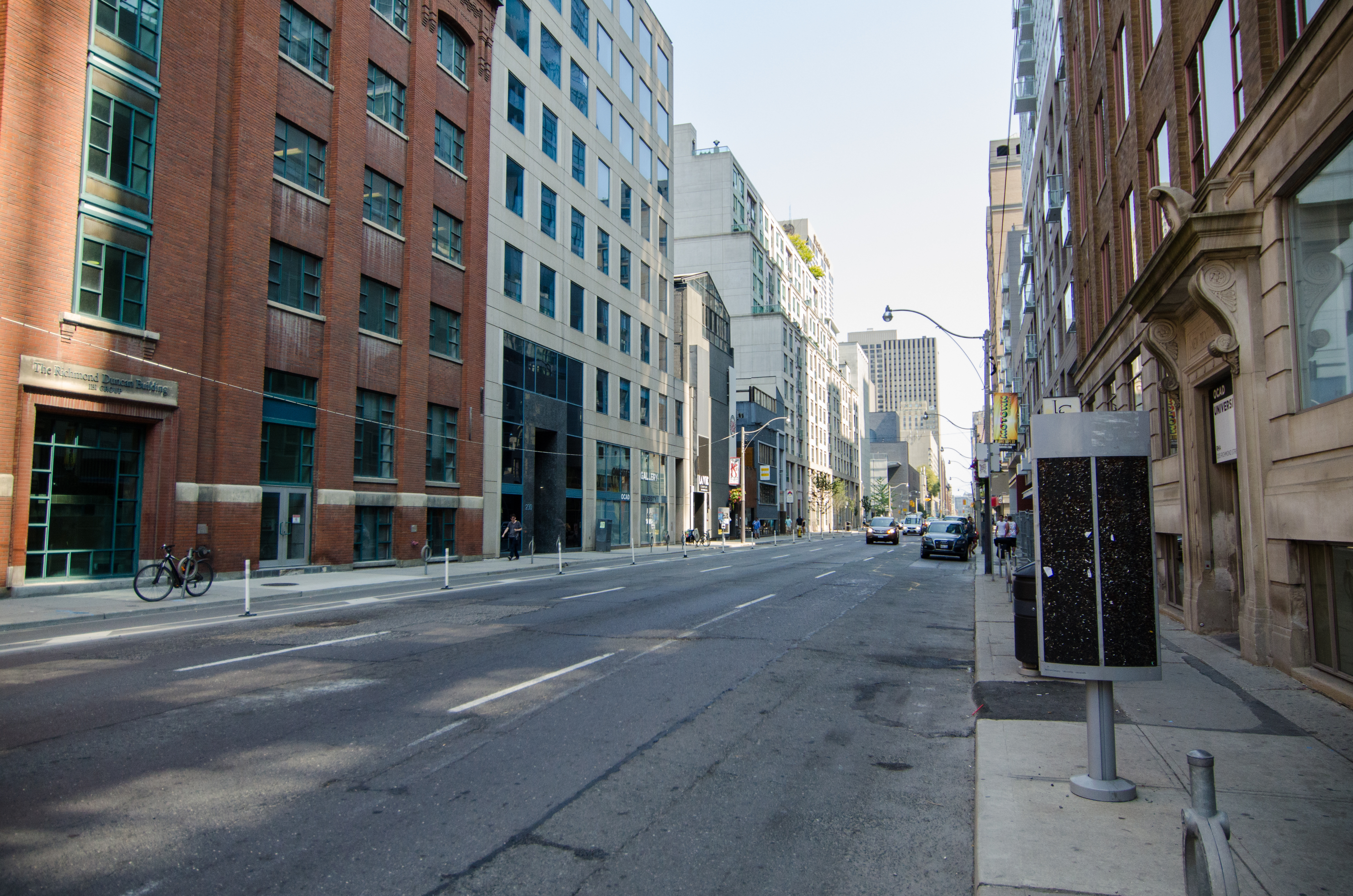
230–240 Richmond Street on the left and 205 Richmond Street on the right.

Likewise, the repurposed mid-rise buildings at the intersection of Richmond Street West and Duncan Street, including 205 and 240 Richmond, hold heritage status; they are among the few remaining brick warehouses from an industrial area formerly known as the Garment District, which existed in the early to mid-20th century. Previously called the New Textile Building, 205 Richmond is an Edwardian classical building that was acquired by the university in 2007. 240 Richmond occupies the former Richmond Duncan Building and is interconnected with 230 Richmond; both sites were acquired in 2008 and contain the university's main administration and services facilities, as well as private offices rented out to the co-working space company WeWork.

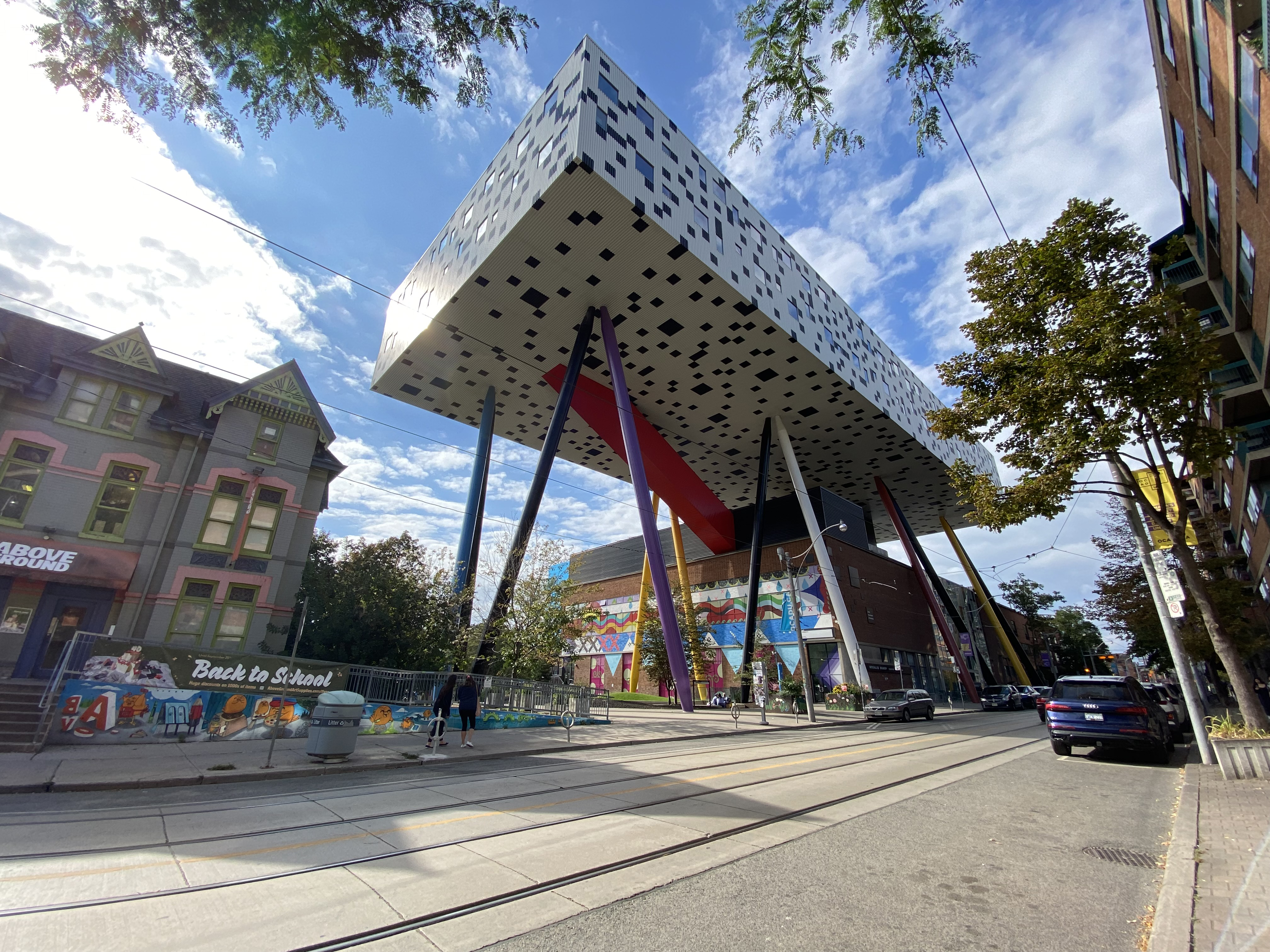
The Sharp Centre for Design was an addition to the Main Building opened in 2004.

Throughout the later half of the twentieth century, several modifications were made to Reid’s original building. On 17 January 1957, the first expansion to the building was inaugurated, a modernist extension known as the A.J. Casson Wing. The Nora E. Vaughan Auditorium, two additional floors, and an atrium were later added to the building through three extensions in 1963, 1967, and 1981. The most recent extension to the Main Building, known as the Sharp Centre for Design, radically departs from the previous modernist extensions, and more so from the Georgian Revival architecture of the historical building. Opening in 2004, the Sharp Centre for Design was conceived by British architect Will Alsop and came out of a participatory design process. The contemporary addition, often described as a table top, consists of a black and white box that is supported by a series of multi-coloured pillars at different angles. The achromatic steel box stands four storeys (26 metres) above the ground and measures 9 metres high, 31 metres wide, and 84 metres long, adding 7,440 square metres to the existing structure below. The $42.5-million expansion and redevelopment is regarded as an architectural landmark in the city, receiving numerous awards including the first Royal Institute of British Architects Worldwide Award, the award of excellence in the "Building in Context" category at the Toronto Architecture and Urban Design Awards, and was deemed the most outstanding technical project overall in the 2005 Canadian Consulting Engineering Awards.

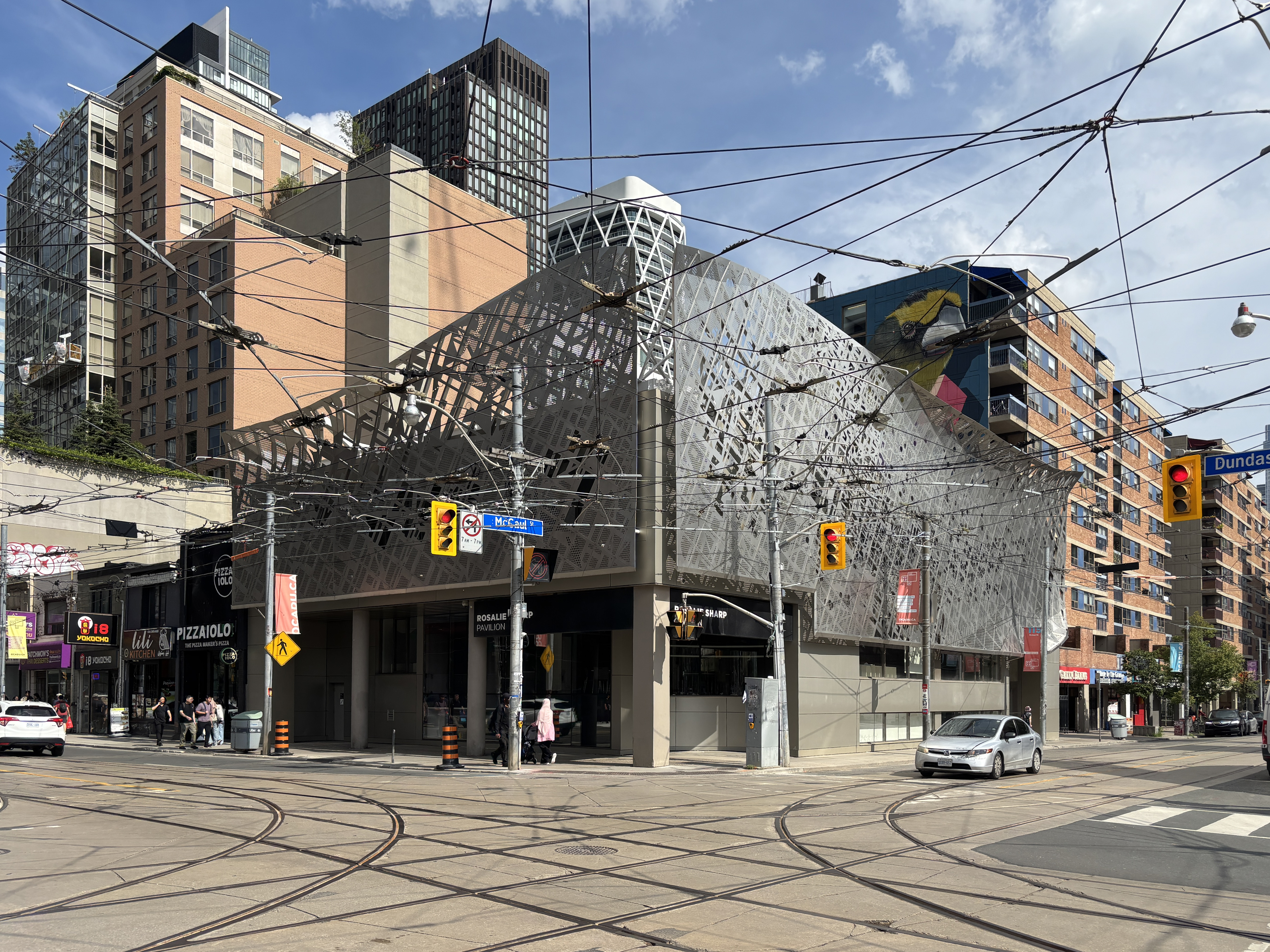
The Rosalie Sharp Pavilion at the southeast corner of Dundas Street and McCaul Street.

As the college expanded, new buildings were added to the campus and the existing neighbourhood, namely the Annex Building and 49–51 McCaul Street, which were built in the 1970s as part of a larger mixed-use complex adjacent to the Main Building. As its name suggests, the Annex is an interconnected building, which shares its ground floor with a small retail concourse that serves the local, residential, and university communities. A distinct architectural feature of 49–51 McCaul is its unique placement within and around the McCaul Loop, a century-old streetcar terminus. In 1998, a separate 2.5-storey building at the corner of McCaul and Dundas Street was acquired and named the Rosalie Sharp Pavilion.

Further campus renovations and enlargements were followed in 2016 through the university’s Ignite Imagination campaign, which aimed to raise $60 million to renovate 95,000 ft^{2} (8,800 m^{2}) of existing space while adding another 55,000 sq ft of new construction — the largest fundraiser in the university’s history. The two-phased project included the revamped interior and exterior of the Rosalie Sharp Pavilion, which incorporates a stainless steel facade scrim that is based on a map of Toronto. Along with the Art Gallery of Ontario, the pavilion is intended to act as a "gateway" to the university's premises by flanking the southern part of the Dundas-McCaul Street intersection.

=== Library ===
The OCAD University Library is the academic library system for the university, which carries a collection of 65,928 print monograph volumes, 76,089 electronic monograph volumes, 4,421 film and video materials, 3,284 electronic serials, 827 audio materials, and over 455,000 graphic materials.

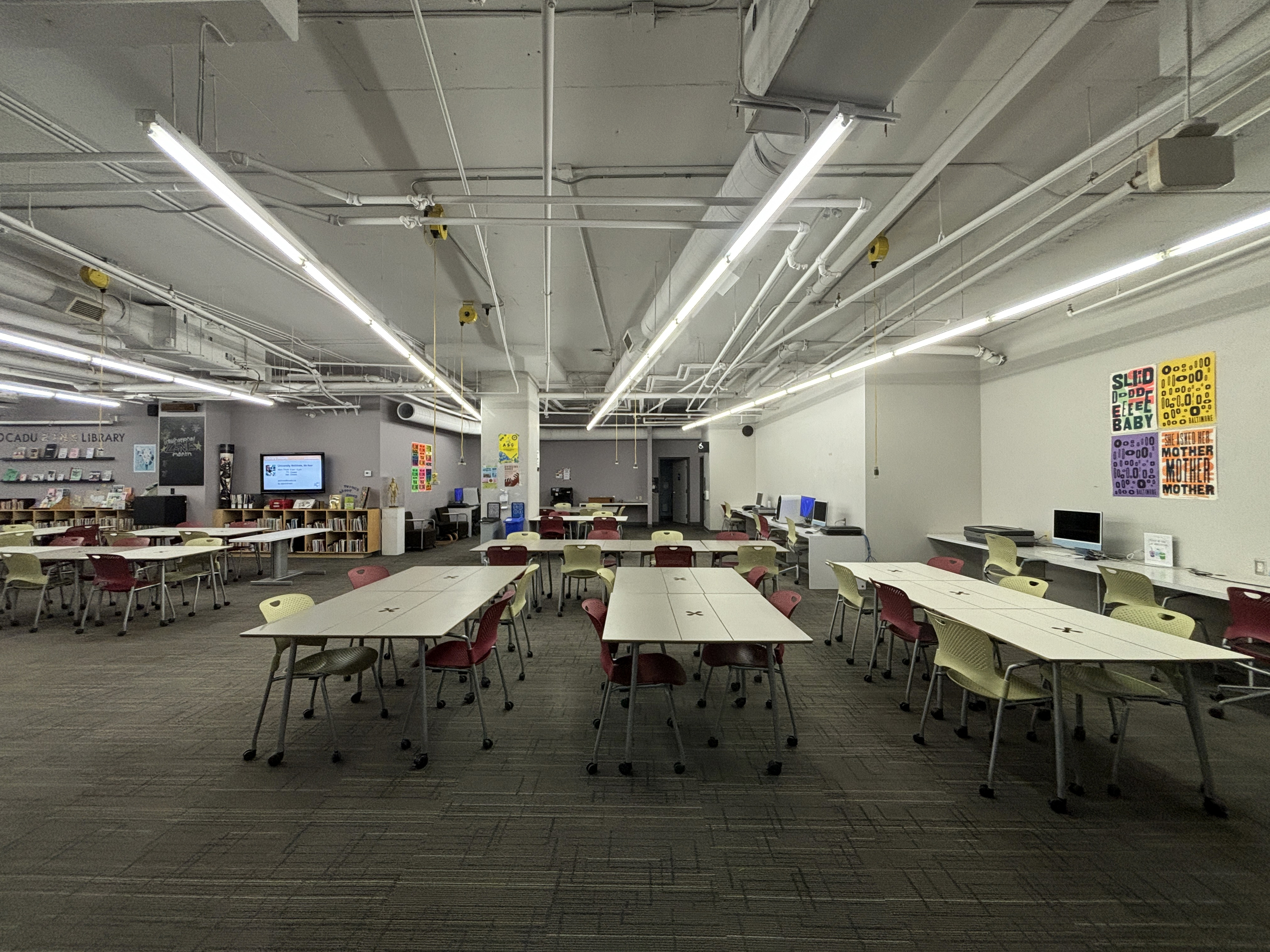
Dorothy H. Hoover Library

The library manages three facilities: the Dorothy H. Hoover Library, The Learning Zone, and the University Archives. The former two facilities are based in the Annex Building while the latter is located in the administration building at 230 Richmond Street West. The Dorothy H. Hoover library is a general research library for art and design that bears the name of the university's first head librarian. Located on the second floor of the Annex Building, the library offers several information programs and resources to support academic research for students and faculty members. It opened in 1987 and is a member of four library consortiums, including the Art Libraries Society of North America and the Ontario Council of University Libraries. Since 2009, the Learning Zone has been located on the ground level, functioning as an open study area and computer lab for individual and group work; it also contains a small selection of zines and printed matter made by current and former students. The Dorothy H. Hoover Library is open to the general public, whereas access to the Library Learning Zone and University Archives is restricted to the university's students and faculty, except during public events and exhibitions.

=== Galleries ===
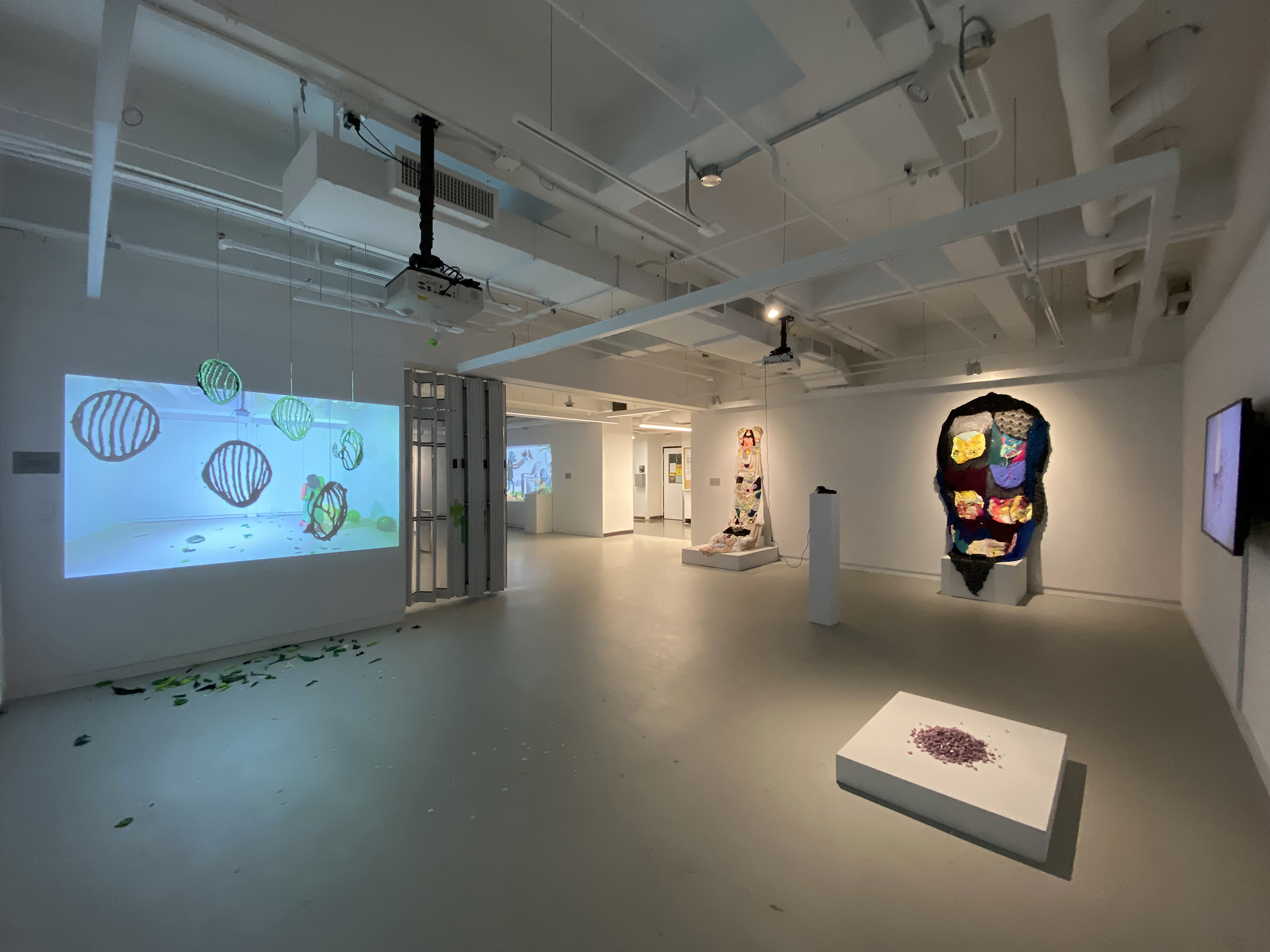
Artwork on display at OCAD University's Ignite Gallery

There are seven galleries operated by the university that exhibit art from students, faculty, alumni, and other professional artists: the Ignite Gallery, Onsite Gallery, Graduate Gallery, Open Space Gallery, Ada Slaight Student Gallery, The Learning Zone, and The Great Hall. Some of the galleries provide priority access to certain students; for example, graduate students are given priority to the Graduate Gallery while the Ada Slaight Student Gallery is mostly used by criticism and curatorial practice students to apply their education. The Onsite Gallery is the university's public gallery that exhibits contemporary art by Indigenous, Canadian, and international artists. The gallery was originally called the OCAD Professional Gallery when it opened in 2007, before it changed to its current name in 2010. The university also has a partnership with Partial Gallery to showcase and sell art from students and graduates.

=== Sustainability ===
The Sustainability Committee is a sub-committee that is charged with creating and implementing sustainable operating practices throughout the university's facilities. In 2009, the university and other members from the Council of Ontario Universities signed a pledge, known as Ontario Universities Committed to a Greener World, to transform its campus into a model of environmental responsibility. According to a 2026 report, the university received a gold rating by the AASHE's Sustainability, Tracking, Assessment, and Rating System (STARS) for its sustainability practices.

== Administration ==
=== Governance ===
As a publicly funded university, OCAD U operates under a bicameral system with a board of governors and a senate empowered by provincial legislation, the Ontario College of Art and Design University Act. The Act was last amended in 2010 when the institution assumed its present name. The 2010 amendments also formalized the role of the university chancellor, as well as converted the former academic council into the academic senate and broadened its duties.

==== Board of Governors and Senate ====
The university's board of governors is charged with managing university affairs and guiding major operational decisions. The board has 18 members, including six individuals appointed by provincial government and two members elected by OCAD University alumni. Eight members are drawn from the university's community, with some being faculty members appointed by the Senate, and others being elected by staff and student representatives. The senate is responsible for the educational policies of the university; it is primarily made up of faculty members, although it also includes representatives from the university's administration and the undergraduate and graduate student body.

The chancellor serves as the titular head of the university and is appointed by the board of governors to a four-year term. The university has named five chancellors, the last being Jamie Watt, who began their four-year tenure on 1 January 2022. The board of governors is also empowered to appoint the university president, who acts as the chief executive officer for the university and on the board's behalf with respect to the institution's operations. By virtue of their office, the president is also the chair of the senate. Ana Serrano is the current president of the university, having assumed the position in July 2020.

==== Indigenous Education Council ====
The Indigenous Education Council was established at the university in 2008 with a mandate "to identify and strengthen collaboration and partnerships with Indigenous communities, government bodies and other associations to promote and advance access, retention, and degree completion for Indigenous learners". The council consists of volunteer members who represent the interests and concerns of both the internal and broader Indigenous community. In accordance with the Aboriginal Post Secondary Education and Training Policy Framework (APSET), the council exists to ensure that Indigenous peoples are consistently and regularly engaged in discussions and decision-making within the institution.

== Academics ==
OCAD University is a comprehensive art, design, and media post-secondary institution, and is the oldest operating school in Canada dedicated to art and design education. The university's academic year consists of two terms, Fall/Winter and Spring/Summer, with the former term running from September through April and the latter running from May through August.

The university is organized into the Faculty of Art, the Faculty of Liberal Arts and Science, and the Faculty of Design. At the undergraduate level, the university offers 17 majors and 26 minors that lead to a Bachelor of Arts, Bachelor of Design, or Bachelor of Fine Arts. Seven graduate-level programs are coordinated through the School of Graduate Studies, which issue Master of Arts, Master of Design, and Master of Fine Arts degrees. The university holds membership in Universities Canada, a national post-secondary organization, and independent quality control of academics is maintained by the Ontario University Council on Quality Assurance.

In the 2024–25 academic year, the university had an enrolment of 4,300 full-time undergraduate and graduate students, along with 1,444 people enrolled in a School of Continuing Studies course the same year. As of 2024, the university's faculty included over 480 members, a third of which are full-time.

=== Reputation ===
According to the 2026 QS World University Rankings for the subject of art and design, OCAD U placed 69 out of 302 universities.

=== Admissions ===
The requirements for admission differ between students from Ontario, students from other Canadian provinces, and international students outside of Canada, due to the lack of uniformity in grading schemes between provinces and countries. Because English is the primary language of instruction at the university, applicants whose first language is not English are required to present proof of proficiency in English. The university has a holistic undergraduate admissions process, which typically requires the minimum admission average alongside an interview, a letter of intent, a writing sample and/or portfolio submission.

In 2024, the university reported an 85 per cent retention rate of first-year students in 2023 who advanced to their second year.

== Research ==
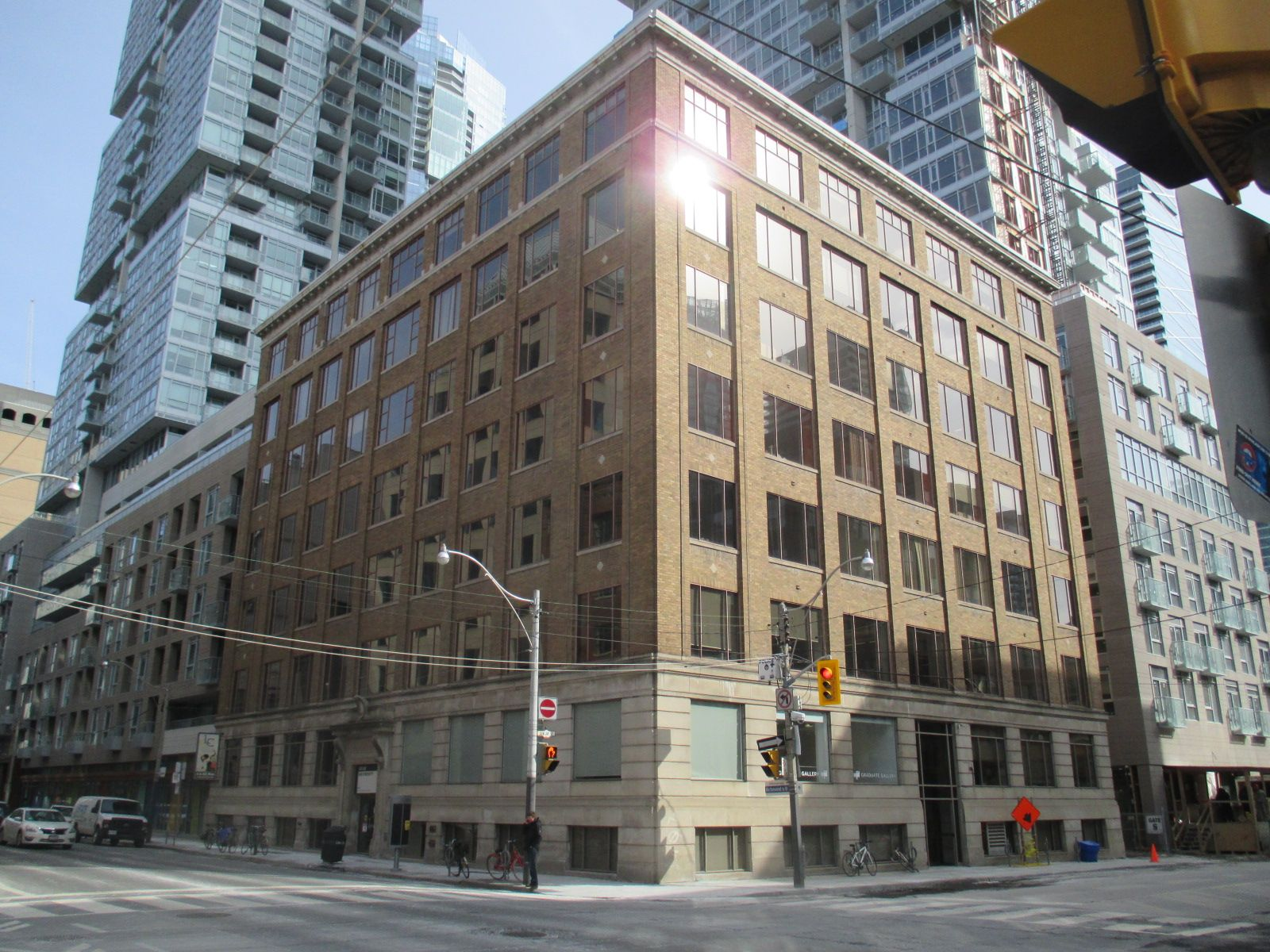
The exterior of 205 Richmond Street West, a building that also houses the university's Inclusive Design Research Centre.

OCAD University is a member of the Association of Independent Colleges of Art and Design (AICAD), a consortium of 38 specialized art and design schools in North America. In 2021, the university co-hosted a virtual symposium with the association titled "Must Give Us Pause: Sustainability and Diversity".

Currently, the university has over 20 research centres and labs, such as the Indigenous Visual Culture (INVC) Research Centre and the Inclusive Design Research Centre (IDRC). During the 2020–21 academic year, the university received over $7.2 million in contributions for research purposes. As of 2022, four faculty members from the university are Canada Research Chairs; three chairholders are part of the Social Sciences and Humanities Research Council, while the other is a part of the Natural Sciences and Engineering Research Council. In the 2019–20 academic year, the university received 24 research awards and $690,625 in funding from the Social Sciences and Humanities Research Council of Canada.

The university is a part of several joint-research networks and projects, including the Centre for Innovation in Information Visualization and Data-Driven Design, and the Inclusive Design Institute (IDI). The former is a research project led by York University in partnership with OCAD, the University of Toronto, and private sector partners to develop new design, analytics, and visualization techniques for new computational tools. The latter organization, headed by faculty member Jutta Treviranus, serves as a hub for research into inclusive designs for information and communications technology; eight other post-secondary institutions also partner with the IDI.

Along with research centres and labs, the university also supports two business incubators, the Imagination Catalyst and the Mobile Experience Innovation Centre. The Imagination Catalyst was established in August 2011 through the merger of the Digital Futures Accelerator and the Design Incubator, and is overseen by the Digital Futures Implementation office, which provides mentorship and entrepreneurial support for students, alumni, and faculty. The Mobile Experience Innovation Centre (MEIC) was founded in 2007 and focuses on applied research in mobile technology.

== Student life ==
Demographics of the student body (2023)
	Undergraduate	Graduate
Male	29.1%	24.2%
Female	70.9%	75.8%
Canadian student	73.4%	56.1%
International student	26.6%	43.9%

The university's student body currently includes 4,670 full- and part-time undergraduate students, as well as 300 full- and part-time graduate students. In 2024–25, 75 per cent of undergraduate students and 52 per cent of graduate students (in the Fall/Winter term) were Canadian citizens or permanent residents, both from Ontario and out of province, while 25 per cent of undergraduates and 48 per cent of graduates were international. Many domestic students receive financial aid through federal Canada Student Loans and/or provincial loan programs, such as the Ontario Student Assistance Program.

The OCAD Student Union (OCADSU) represents the university's student body population and is a member organization of the Canadian Federation of Students. The union's offices are located inside 230 Richmond, and they provide services including academic advocacy, a food bank, legal services, and student grants. In addition to OCADSU, a variety of cultural, social, political, and recreational student groups are officially registered with the university.

OCAD U does not have any student residences on campus, though it offers students resources to search for off-campus accommodations in the city.

== Insignias ==
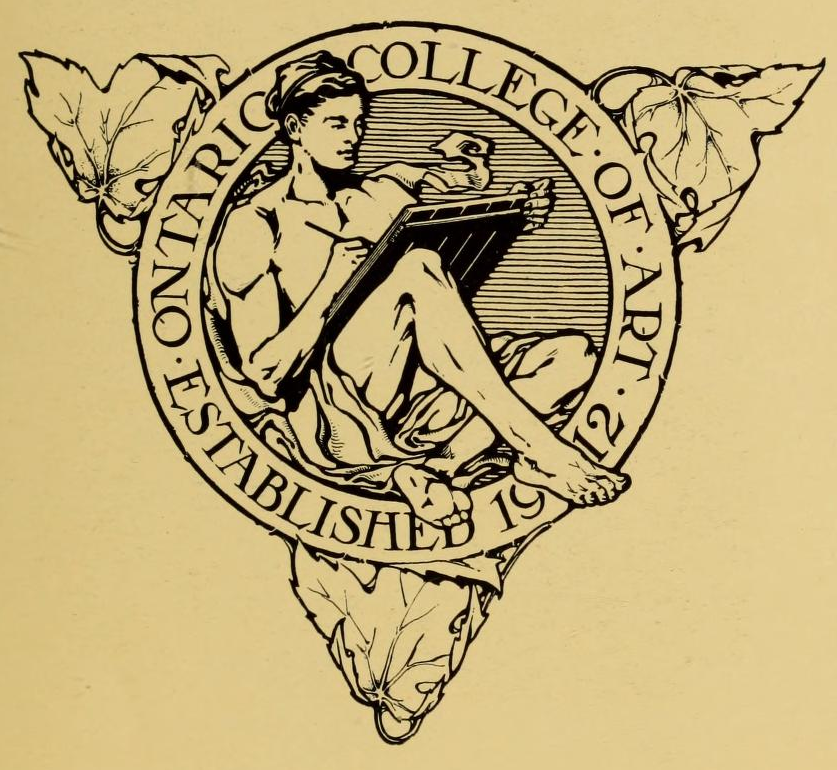
The former logo for the Ontario College of Art (introduced in 1912)

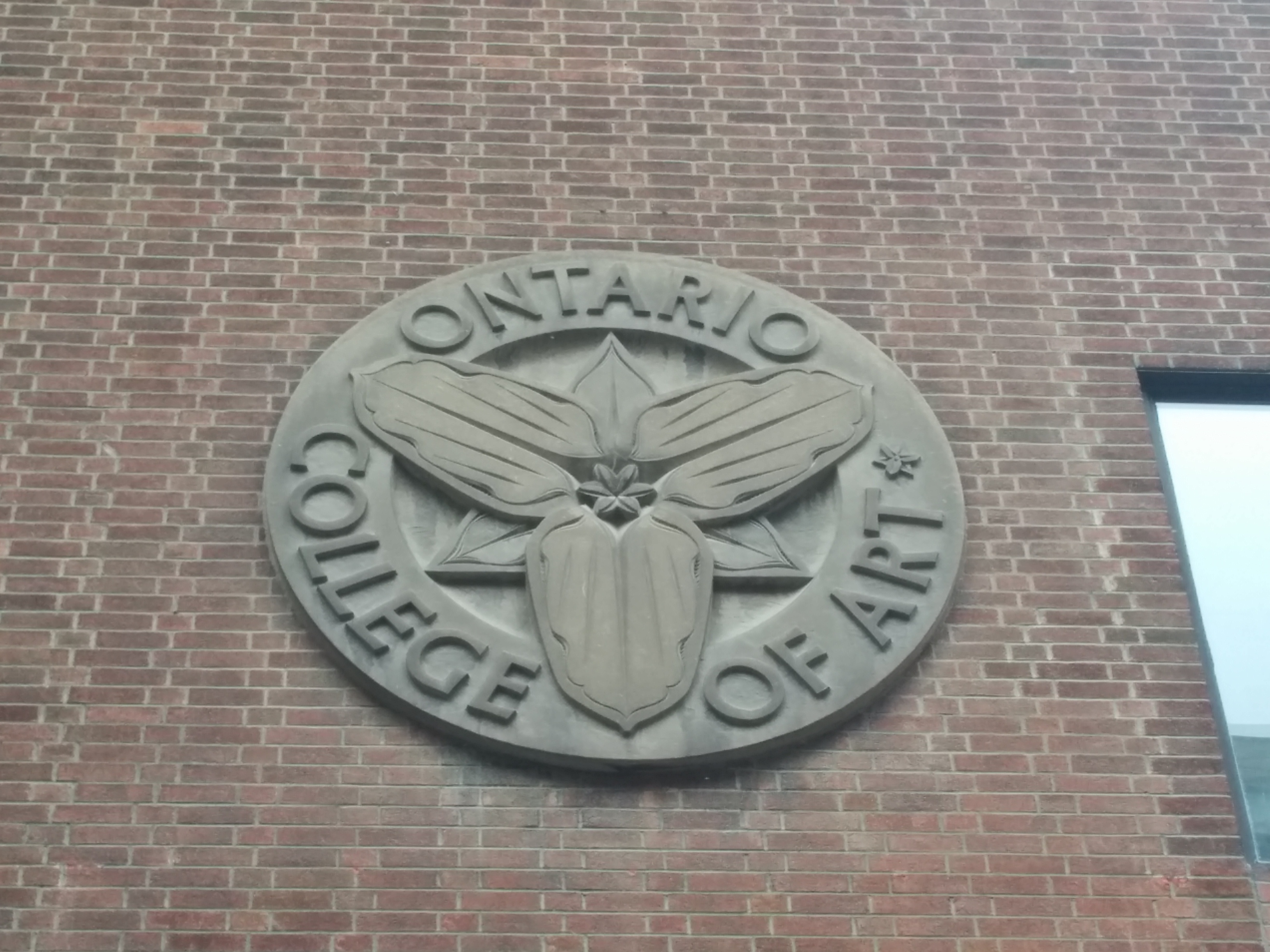
The former logo for the Ontario College of Art (introduced in 1957) adorned on the Main Building.

The institution used a logo as early as 1903 to serve as a visual identifier. Since that time, the institution has used at least nine distinct logos. The present Gotham-type logo was designed by alumnus Bruce Mau and was introduced in 2011 to coincide with the institution's name change to OCAD University in 2010.

== Notable people ==
Several individuals are associated with the university either as alumni, or members of its administration or faculty. As of 2026, there are over 27,000 OCAD University alumni worldwide. Alumni can join the OCAD Alumni Association, an independent group of OCAD graduates.

Several alumni and faculty have gained prominence in the field of visual arts and design. This includes all the original members from the Group of Seven: Franklin Carmichael, A. J. Casson, A. Y. Jackson, Franz Johnston, Arthur Lismer, J. E. H. MacDonald, and Frederick Varley; as well as several members from the Canadian Group of Painters and the Painters Eleven, including Anna Savage, George Pepper, Yvonne McKague Housser, Jack Bush, and Harold Town. Other notable alumni and faculty members from the institution include Barbara Astman, Aba Bayefsky, J. W. Beatty, David Blackwood, David Bolduc, Dennis Burton, Ian Carr-Harris, Charles Comfort, Graham Coughtry, Greg Curnoe, Ken Danby, Allan Fleming, Richard Gorman, Fred S. Haines, Charles William Jefferys, Burton Kramer, Nobuo Kubota, Isabel McLaughlin, Lucius Richard O'Brien, Joanna Pocock, George Agnew Reid, John Scott, Michael Snow, Lisa Steele, Colette Whiten, and Agnes Chow.

== See also ==
- Education in Toronto
- Higher education in Ontario
- List of art schools
- List of universities in Ontario
