= JustSystems =

Japanese software company

JustSystems Corporation
- Native name: 株式会社ジャストシステム
- Type: Public
- Traded as: TYO: 4686
- Industry: Computer software
- Founded: 1979; 47 years ago, in Tokushima City, Tokushima, Japan
- Founders: Hatsuko Ukigawa; Kazunori Ukigawa
- Headquarters: Tokushima City, Tokushima, Japan
- Key people: Kyotaro Sekinada (president)
- Products: Software and services
- Revenue: ¥13,088 million (year ending 31 March 2007)
- Owner: Keyence Corporation (43.96%); Kazunori Ukigawa (13.43%); Hatsuko Ukigawa (11.35%)
- Number of employees: 916 (2008)
- Subsidiaries: Justsystem Service Corporation; JustSystems US Holding, Inc. JustSystems North America, Inc. JustSystems Canada Inc. JustSystems Evans Research, Inc. JustSystems EMEA Ltd. Dalian Justsystem Co., Ltd.
- Website: www.justsystems.com/en

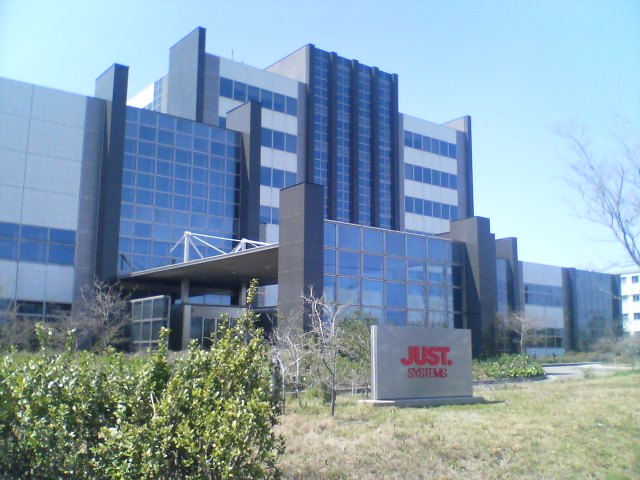
Corporate headquarters

JustSystems Corporation (Japanese: 株式会社ジャストシステム, Hepburn: Kabushiki-gaisha Jasuto-Shisutemu) is a Japanese software development house. The company's main products were a word processor, Ichitaro ("JohnnyOne"), a Japanese input method, ATOK. In 2010s, they focus on correspondence education and enterprise software.

== Description ==
JustSystems is based in Tokushima on Shikoku island in Japan. Its most recent business has focused on Java and XML-themed technology development. As of 2012, JustSystems is the only Japanese full member of the Unicode Consortium.

== History ==
JustSystems was founded in 1979 by Hatsuko and Kazunori Ukigawa, and was incorporated in June 1981. Early in the company's history, it created one of the first computer input methods for Japanese users, allowing kanji characters to be entered with a QWERTY keyboard. In the mid-1990s, JustSystems founded the Justsystem Pittsburgh Research Center near Carnegie Mellon University. In 1996, JustSystems purchased Claritech, a Carnegie Mellon startup run by David Evans, and renamed it JustSystems Evans Research (JSERI). In 1997, JustSystems went public and was listed on the JASDAQ Securities Exchange.

In 2006, JustSystems purchased the XMetaL XML authoring suite from Blast Radius to complement its xfy XML development platform. In 2009, Keyence Corporation became the largest shareholder of JustSystems. Later that year, Kazunori and Hatsuko Ukigawa resigned from the company.

== See also ==
- Justsystem Pittsburgh Research Center
