= Mallet (software project) =

MALLET
- Developers: Andrew McCallum, with contributions from several graduate students and staff
- Stable release: 2.0.8 / May 3, 2016; 10 years ago
- Written in: Java
- Operating system: Cross-platform
- Type: Machine Learning
- License: Common Public License 1.0
- Website: mallet.cs.umass.edu

MALLET is a Java "Machine Learning for Language Toolkit".

== Description ==
MALLET is an integrated collection of Java code useful for statistical natural language processing, document classification, cluster analysis, information extraction, topic modeling and other machine learning applications to text.

== History ==
MALLET was developed primarily by Andrew McCallum, of the University of Massachusetts Amherst, with assistance from graduate students and faculty from both UMASS and the University of Pennsylvania.
