= Yuri Rubinsky =

Lebanese-born writer and software executive

- Born: August 2, 1952; Tripoli, Lebanon
- Died: January 21, 1996 (aged 43); Toronto, Canada
- Occupation: Software architect
- Spouse: Holley Rubinsky (1984–death)

Yuri Ivan Rubinsky (August 2, 1952 – January 21, 1996) was a Lebanese-born writer, software executive, and promoter of the Standard Generalized Markup Language (SGML), which was the basis for the now-ubiquitous XML. In Canada, he is probably best known as founding co-director of the Banff Publishing Workshop and for his work in applying technology to help visually impaired people. The Yuri Rubinsky Memorial Award was created posthumously in his memory.

== Early life ==
Yuri was born in Tripoli, Lebanon on August 2, 1952, the son of Andrew and Anna Rubinsky. He and his family emigrated to the Toronto, Ontario, Canada, area when he was three. He is a graduate of Brock University and studied architecture at the University of Toronto. After a variety of jobs in the Yukon, Yuri focused on the publishing industry. During the summer of 1978, he attended the Radcliffe Publishing course (now the Columbia Publishing Course) at Harvard University. Yuri was so impressed with this course that he persuaded the Banff Centre for the Arts to sponsor the Banff Publishing Workshop (now the SFU Summer Publishing Workshops) two years later.

In 1984, Yuri married Holley Rubinsky, a writer who he had met at a Banff Publishing Workshop.

He died at age 43 on January 21, 1996, after suffering a massive and unexpected heart attack at his home in Toronto, Canada.

== SoftQuad and SGML ==
In 1984, along with partners David Slocombe, Stan Bevington, and Patrick Dempster, Yuri founded a small Toronto-based technology company called SoftQuad, of which he was President. SoftQuad was started in order to improve automated typesetting at Toronto's Coach House Press, and for many years developed a version of troff. SoftQuad developed and sold a variety of SGML tools, such as Author/Editor, and notably one of the first commercial HTML authoring products, HoTMetaL. From the beginning, Yuri was instrumental in bringing the SGML community together and spreading the SGML gospel. He was widely respected and well-liked. He was one of the founders of the SGML Open consortium, and very active as an organizer and speaker at industry and standards events. In 1995 Yuri sponsored the SoftQuad Web Award presented to Doug Engelbart at the Fourth Annual WWW Conference in Boston, publishing the keepsake booklet Boosting Our Collective IQ as a special tribute to Doug to be given to attendees of the award ceremony.

== Accessibility ==
Yuri was interested in the problem of accessibility—making software and information more usable for people with physical disabilities. In particular, he was active in using SGML to improve the access to information of blind and visually impaired people. He was technical chair of the International Committee for Accessible Document Design (ICADD), and worked towards making HTML more accessible. Using SGML source files, Yuri's novel Christopher Columbus Answers All Charges (see below) was coded into Braille and produced on voice synthesizer before it was printed on paper.

== Writing ==
Yuri was an author of both fiction and scholarly material, a publisher, and most importantly a visionary. His books include A History of The End of The World (1982), The Wankers' Guide to Canada (1986) and (as co-author, with Marc Giacomelli) the novel Christopher Columbus Answers All Charges (1993). He was editor of Charles Goldfarb's The SGML Handbook (1990) and SoftQuad's The SGML Primer (1991). At the time of his death he was working on SGML on the Web (1997) which was completed by his friend and colleague Murray Maloney.

In addition to books, Yuri co-authored and produced the play Invisible Cities in 1981; authored a one-edition newspaper spoof, Not The Globe and Mail (1984); created and edited Yorker magazine (1985–1986); and co-authored and produced SGML: The Movie (1990).

== Quotes ==
One of Yuri's most famous quotes:

"There is no point in storing anything unless you can find it again, in its most useful component elements, ready to be re-purposed. There is a danger in allowing your most valuable asset—the 90% of your information that is in documents—to be locked away in proprietary, unmanaged, unmanageble electronic formats. Luckily, SGML provides an internationally standardized, vendor-supported, multi-purpose, independent way of doing business. If you aren't using it today, you will be next year." (1994)
