= SoftQuad Software =

Canadian software company

SoftQuad Software, Ltd.
- Type: Public
- Industry: Software
- Founded: 1984; 42 years ago in Toronto
- Founders: Yuri Rubinsky; David Slocombe; Stan Bevington
- Defunct: 2001
- Fate: Acquired by Just Systems
- Products: HoTMetaL

SoftQuad Software, Ltd., was a Canadian software company best known for HoTMetaL, the first commercial HTML editor. It is also known for Author/Editor, the first specialized SGML editor, and Panorama, the first browser plugin for SGML. Panorama demonstrated the need for standardization of SGML on the web, which eventually resulted in the development of the XML specification.

HoTMetaL was one of a series of applications created by SoftQuad for editing, viewing and publishing structured (SGML and XML) content. It was based upon a popular SGML Editor called Author/Editor and has since evolved into XMetaL.

== Early history ==
SoftQuad started its life in 1984 as a technology-oriented spin-off of Toronto's Coach House Press. Its founders were Yuri Rubinsky, David Slocombe and Stan Bevington.

SoftQuad was started in order to improve automated typesetting at Toronto's Coach House Press, and for many years developed an enhanced commercial version of the text formatting program troff, developed under license from AT&T, called sqtroff. It was sold with a suite of associated programs, corresponding to AT&T's Documenter's Workbench, under the name SoftQuad Publishing Software (SQPS).

SoftQuad's business headquarters was in Toronto. After SQPS was largely supplanted by Author/Editor as SoftQuad's main product, product development was transitioned to the Vancouver area, retaining the Toronto team as combined professional services and customization development for Author/Editor and its associated software development kit, called "Sculptor". This arrangement arose out of a highly coincidental reunion of Yuri Rubinsky (in Toronto) and his high school friend Peter Sharpe. Peter Sharpe led the development of Author/Editor.

With its early lead and its leader, Yuri Rubinsky, SoftQuad provided direction to the nascent SGML community. For example, Yuri Rubinsky was the first president of SGML Open.

== Author/Editor ==
Author/Editor appeared on the market in 1988 as the world's first specialized SGML editing application. The first version ran on the Macintosh. Windows and Unix versions followed in 1991. Author/Editor 3.0 was summarized as "a very pure structure editor which validates the document all the time. Documents which have a structure that doesn't comply with their document type definition can be edited by turning rules checking off, which can be helpful when re-arranging documents. The main window is a QUASIWYG representation of text, a structure view and a context view are also available. The structure view shows tags indented, the context view shows paths in the same way. An element list is used to pick up an element to insert. The representation on screen is done with a style editor, which generates style files. The program has many DTD with it, but new DTD's are imported by the RulesBuilder, which converts a DTD to a structure definition required by Author/Editor. There is an English thesaurus and a dictionary for spell checking."

After several versions, Author/Editor was sold with the Panorama suite to Interleaf in September, 1998. At the same time, the Toronto development team, led by David A. Keldsen, joined Interleaf to help focus the company on content management and create new products. By that point, SoftQuad's focus had shifted to its descendants, HoTMetaL and XMetaL. Interleaf did not produce new versions of Author/Editor. Sales were discontinued in 2000.

Author/Editor had sibling products RulesBuilder and Sculptor, the Application Builder. RulesBuilder was used for compiling SGML DTDs to a fully resolved and validated binary form that Author/Editor could consume. Sculptor was used to build customized user interfaces for Author/Editor. ApplicationBuilder used Scheme for its customization language. Sculptor is conceptually the ancestor of today's XMetaL Developer.

== Panorama ==
Panorama was a multi-platform web browser plugin for SGML content. There was a style editor and support for linking using a mixture of SGML HyTime and TEI Pointers. There was also support for distributed annotations.

Panorama was described as "A browser for SGML texts. The NCSA (National Center for Supercomputer Applications) includes the [free] version of Panorama into its Mosaic delivery. The Mosaic [browser] will launch Panorama when it encounters any other SGML file than an HTML file. Panorama will have a style editor to define the outlook of documents. The commercial version has additional features like the ability to create annotations and customized bookmarks."

== SoftQuad goes public ==
In 1992, SoftQuad went public on the Vancouver Stock Exchange through a reverse takeover of BC's "Hatco". In January 1994, SoftQuad was listed on the Toronto Stock Exchange.

== HoTMetaL ==
Released in 1994, HoTMetaL was the first commercial HTML authoring product. SoftQuad was able to beat other products to the market by virtue of the fact that HTML was defined as an application (Document Type Definition) of SGML. By virtue of this strong base and early lead, HoTMetaL became very popular as a tool for creating HTML web sites.

HoTMetaL was initially free, but a commercial version HoTMetaL Pro was soon released. Early versions of HoTMetaL ran on Windows and Unix. HoTMetaL Pro also ran on Macintosh, but by version 5, it was restricted to Windows.

On the basis of HoTMetaL's early success, SoftQuad was able to go public on the NASDAQ stock exchange as SWEBF.

Over time, however, companies like Microsoft and Netscape increasingly saw HTML authoring tools as loss leaders to tempt web developers into their product suites.

In addition, HoTMetaL adhered to the SGML philosophies that dictated that content should adhere to standards and that the structure and presentation of content should be separate. HoTMetaL was excellent at visualizing the structure of the content, and of enforcing the standards. But neither of these were as important to Web designers as "What You See Is What You Get" presentation of the content, which was better provided by products like DreamWeaver and FrontPage.

In September, 1996, SoftQuad released HoTMetaL Intranet Publisher (HiP). HiP was essentially an Intranet Content Management System.

== Corporate transitions ==
After Yuri Rubinsky's death in January 1996, SoftQuad went through a variety of transitions.

In November 1996, SoftQuad reported substantial revenue growth but also substantial losses.

In December 1996, SoftQuad acquired Alpha Software, creator of popular desktop database publishing software. Alpha's software was intended to be integrated with SoftQuad's to enable Web-based publishing of database-stored information.

Alpha Software's Richard Rabins was made an Executive Vice President of SoftQuad International Inc. In September, 1997, he became CEO after SoftQuad's losses mounted. The positions of President and Chief Financial Officer were also changed at the same time. Essentially, the Alpha Software team was asked to use its experience in commercial software to turn the struggling company around.

In June 1998, Rabins decided to change the company's direction from markup technologies to a children's game subsidiary (NewKidCo) of SoftQuad International's Alpha software subsidiary.

On October 9, 1998, SoftQuad was delisted from NASDAQ (but not the Toronto Stock Exchange) after falling under the minimum share price guidelines.

On November 10, 1998, SoftQuad International Inc. sold the assets (including trademarks) of SoftQuad Inc. (the structured authoring tools business) to private investors and management. This meant that after the purchase, SoftQuad was a private company again, this time named "SoftQuad Software Ltd." The parent company, SoftQuad International Ltd. was later renamed "NewKidCo" to reflect the fact that they did intended to pursue a different business than the historical SoftQuad and the new SoftQuad Software.

In December 2000, SoftQuad bought Advanced Data Engineering (ADEI), a conversion tools company from Petaluma, California. ADEI employees became the core of SoftQuad's XML consulting business.

In September 2000, SoftQuad released a short-lived product called MarketAgility. From a press release of the time: "MarketAgility Enterprise is a server-based solution built on Microsoft SQL Server and is administered through a simple browser interface. It automates the collection, normalization and incremental updating of product information from wherever it resides in an enterprise into an XML-based master catalog."

In January 2001, a former employee of SoftQuad formed a company called Enfolding Systems Corp. That company was acquired by Blast Radius in August 2002 and later, as a subsidiary of Blast Radius, acquired the SoftQuad assets from Corel Corp.

In August 2001, SoftQuad Software Ltd. was bought by desktop software vendor Corel for about US$37 million in stock. After the Corel Acquisition, SoftQuad ceased to exist as a company, though many employees remained with the company as part of Corel's XMetaL division in Vancouver.

Subsequently, SoftQuad and most assets of the company were sold to Blast Radius in 2002.

In 2004, Just Systems acquired SoftQuad's remaining assets, including its flagship XMetaL product, from Blast Radius. Today, XMetaL and most other Softquad assets are owned by JustSystems and the core code of XMetaL is maintained by some of the same programmers who worked at various incarnations of SoftQuad.

== Controversy ==
In March 2000, SoftQuad merged with American Sports Machine, effectively becoming an OTCBB public company. The new company was quickly renamed SoftQuad Software Ltd. and given the stock symbol SXML.

In late 2000, SoftQuad stock was involved in the Bermuda Short sting. 58 stock brokers and executives were indicted in the case which involved "defrauding the shareholders of C-Me-Run, SoftQuad and JagNotes by artificially inflating the market price of these stocks through illegal means."

In 2004, two men caught in the Bermuda Short sting pleaded guilty to stock fraud involving SoftQuad and other penny stocks. Court records state that Paul D. Lemmon and Mark Valentine "conspired to unjustly enrich themselves by defrauding a fictitious foreign mutual fund (the “Fund”) through paying undisclosed payoffs and kickbacks to brokers in exchange for causing the Fund to purchase large amounts of overpriced C-Me-Run, SoftQuad and JagNotes stocks."

== XMetaL ==
XMetaL was one of the first XML authoring products and has remained popular for almost a decade. Unlike tools like the popular XML Spy, XMetaL used a word processor metaphor and was designed to be used by writers and not programmers.

Along with Cisco and Hewlett-Packard, Microsoft was an early site-license customer for XMetaL and according to public reports, still uses XMetaL widely.

== Notable SoftQuad employees ==
- Yuri Rubinsky
- Peter Sharpe
- David Slocombe
- Lauren Wood
- Michael Fergusson
- David A. Keldsen
- Frank Ruffolo
- James Clark
- Murray Maloney
- Liam Quin
- Farook Wadia
- Mark Brader
- Pontus Hedman
- Wendy Harrison
- Ian Darwin
- Laura Creighton
- Pierre Garigue
- David Polk
- Rodney Boyd
- Donald Teed
- Bill Clarke
- Teddy Mihail

== Notes ==
- troff text processing FAQ
- SoftQuad software used in the publication of the SGML Standard
- Richard Rabins announces a new focus for SoftQuad International on childrend's software
- Press Release after SoftQuad International sells assets of SoftQuad Inc.
- Softquad buys Softquad
- History of American Sports Machine and SoftQuad Software's public phase
- Anatomy of the Bermuda Short Sting
- Interleaf technology acquisition
- Corel Buys XML Developer Softquad
