= Yuri Rubinsky Memorial Award =

The "Yuri Rubinsky Memorial Award" was a prize that was awarded annually at the International World Wide Web Conference. Yuri Rubinsky, in cooperation with the International WWW Conference Committee (iW3C2), presented the SoftQuad Award for Excellence to Doug Engelbart at the Fourth International WWW Conference in Boston in December, 1995. Following his death in January 1996, the Yuri Rubinsky Insight Foundation took up the award. According to the foundation, it is given "to an individual who has contributed, through a lifetime of effort, to the care and feeding of the global information infrastructure." The award is accompanied by a cash payout of $10,000.

Ted Nelson, upon receiving the award in 1998, informed the audience that it was the first award that he had ever received in recognition of his work.

The iW3C2 withdrew its cooperation in 2000 after Richard Stallman was chosen in 1999 by a panel of previous recipients of the award.

== Recipients ==
- 1995 Douglas Engelbart
- 1996 Vint Cerf
- 1997 Gregg Vanderheiden
- 1998 Ted Nelson
- 1999 Richard Stallman
