= Michael Witbrock =

New Zealand artificial intelligence researcher

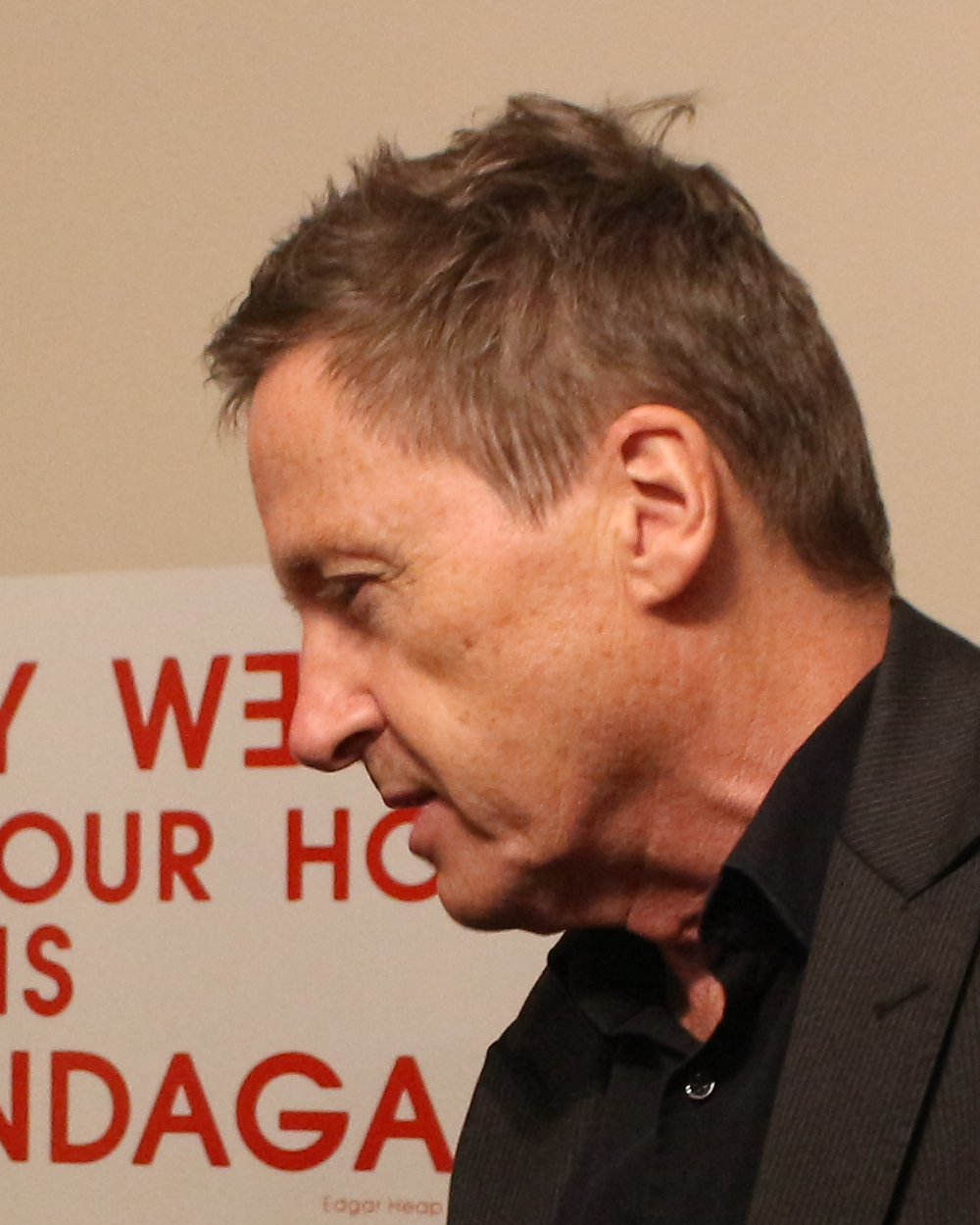
- Witbrock in 2024
- Born: Michael John Witbrock; Christchurch, New Zealand
- Education: Carnegie Mellon University
- Known for: Cycorp, Cyc, Common Lisp, ObjectStore
- Scientific career
- Fields: Computer science

Michael John Witbrock is a computer scientist in the field of artificial intelligence. Witbrock is a native of New Zealand and is the former vice president of Research at Cycorp, which is carrying out the Cyc project in an effort to produce a genuine artificial intelligence.

== Background and affiliations ==
Witbrock was born in Christchurch, New Zealand, and has a Ph.D. in computer science from Carnegie Mellon University. Before joining Cycorp, he was a principal scientist at Terra Lycos, working on integrating statistical and knowledge-based approaches to understanding Web user behavior; he has also been associated with Just Systems Pittsburgh Research Center and the Informedia Digital Library at Carnegie Mellon.

In 2016, Witbrock joined and led the Reasoning Lab at IBM Watson.

In 2019, Witbrock was recruited by the government and returned to his home country to establish and lead AI research initiatives in New Zealand

== Research topics ==
Witbrock's dissertation work was on speaker modeling; before going to Cycorp, he published in a broad range of areas, including:

- Neural networks
- Multimedia information retrieval
- Natural language understanding
- Genetic design
- Computational linguistics
- Speech recognition
- Web-browser design

His work at Cycorp has focused on improving its knowledge formation efforts, particularly dialogue processing, machine reasoning, and on improving accessibility to the Cyc project.

At the University of Auckland, Witbrock's research spans natural language processing, multi-hop reasoning, causal inference, graph neural networks, focusing on advancing AI's interpretability, robustness, and real-world applications.

== Selected publications ==
- Witbrock, Michael J., Srinivas, K., Thost, V., et al. "A Deep Reinforcement Learning Approach to First-Order Logic Theorem Proving," in Proceedings of the AAAI Conference on Artificial Intelligence, 2021.
- Witbrock, Michael J., Deng, Z., Chen, Y., Amor, R. "Robust Node Classification on Graph Data with Graph and Label Noise," in Proceedings of the AAAI Conference on Artificial Intelligence, 2024.
- Witbrock, Michael J., Gendron, G., Bao, Q., Dobbie, G. "Large Language Models Are Not Strong Abstract Reasoners Yet," arXiv preprint, 2023.
- Witbrock, Michael, Baxter, David, Curtis, Jon, et al. "An Interactive Dialogue System for Knowledge Acquisition in Cyc," in Proceedings of the IJCAI-2003 Workshop on Mixed-Initiative Intelligent Systems, Acapulco, Aug 9, 2003.
- O’Hara, Tom, Witbrock, Michael, Aldag, Bjorn, Bertolo, Stefano, Salay, Nancy, Curtis, Jon, and Panton, Kathy. "Inducing Criteria of Lexicalization of Parts of Speech using the Cyc KB," in Proceedings of IJCAI-03, Acapulco August 12–15, 2003.
- Mittal, Vibhu O. and Witbrock, Michael J. "Language Modeling Experiments in Non-Extractive Summarization," Chapter 10 in Croft, W. Bruce and Lafferty, John, Language Modeling for Information Retrieval. Kluwer Academic Publishers, Dordrect, 2003.
- Banko, Michele, Mittal, Vibhu O., and Witbrock, Michael J., "Headline Generation Based on Statistical Translation," in ACL-2000, Proceedings of the 38th Annual Meeting of the Association for Computational Linguistics, Hong Kong, Oct 3-6, 2000.
- Witbrock, Michael J., and Mittal, Vibhu O., "Ultra-Summarization: A Statistical Approach to Generating Highly Condensed Non-Extractive Summaries," in SIGIR’99, Proceedings of the 22nd International Conference on Research and Development in Information Retrieval, Berkeley, CA, Aug 15-19, 1999.
- Hauptman, A., Witbrock, M., and Christel, M., "News-on-Demand: An Application of Informedia Technology," d-lib Magazine, The Magazine of the Digital Library Forum, September 1995.
- Fischer, Michael, Meyer, Michael, and Witbrock, Michael. "User Extensibility in Amiga Mosaic." Proceedings of the Second International World Wide Web Conference (WWW) '94: Mosaic and the Web, October, 1994.
- Witbrock, Michael and Zagha, Marco. "Back-Propagation Learning on the IBM GF11," Chapter in Przytula, K.W., and Prasanna Kumar, V.K. Parallel Digital Implementations of Neural Networks PTR Prentice Hall. Englewood Cliffs. 1993.
- Witbrock, Michael and Haffner, Patrick. "Rapid Connectionist Speaker Adaptation," Proceedings of the IEEE 1992 International Conference on Acoustics, Speech, and Signal Processing, March, 1992.

== Random art ==
Together with John Mount, Witbrock is credited with genetic art, a kind of Computer-generated art.
