= Holley Rubinsky =

American-born Canadian fiction writer (1943 – 2015)

- Born: May 18, 1943 Long Beach, California
- Died: August 1, 2015 (aged 72) Kaslo, British Columbia
- Spouse: Yuri Rubinsky (1984–death)

Holley Rubinsky (May 18, 1943 – August 1, 2015) was an American-born Canadian fiction writer who lived in Kaslo, British Columbia.

== Biography ==
Rubinsky was born on May 18, 1943, in Long Beach, California. She came to Kaslo, British Columbia, in 1976 with her daughter, the artist and children's book writer, Robin Ballard.

In 1984, she married Yuri Rubinsky, whom she had met at a Banff Publishing Workshop, and couple moved to Toronto.

The title story of Rubinsky's first book, Rapid Transits and Other Stories (Polestar, 1991), won the first $10,000 Journey Prize (1989), as well as the Canadian National Magazine Awards Gold Medal for fiction and a nomination for the Western Magazines Award. At First I Hope for Rescue (Knopf Canada, 1997; Picador, 1998) was shortlisted for B.C.'s Ethel Wilson Fiction Prize, and was chosen for the Barnes & Noble Booksellers "Discover great new writers program". Beyond This Point was published by McClelland & Stewart in 2006. Her collection of short fiction, South of Elfrida (Brindle & Glass), was published in 2013.

Yuri died January 21, 1996, after suffering a massive and unexpected heart attack. After his death, she moved to Arizona, then returned to Kaslo in 2001.

From 2006–2008, Rubinsky was host of The Writers' Show produced by CJLY-FM, Kootenay Coop Radio, a weekly program about the process of writing and experiences in publishing.

Rubinsky died of cancer on August 1, 2015. Since 2016, she has been memorialized by the Holley Rubinsky Blue Pencil Sessions at the annual Elephant Mountain Literary Festival in Nelson, British Columbia.

== Awards and honours ==
Awards for Rubinsky's writing
Year	Title	Award	Result	Ref.
1998	At First I Hope for Rescue	Ethel Wilson Fiction Prize	Finalist	
1989	"Rapid Transit"	Journey Prize for Best Short Story	Winner	

== Publications ==
- Rapid Transit and Other Stories. Vancouver: Polestar, 1991.
- At First I Hope For Rescue. Toronto: Knopf Canada, 1997; New York: Picador, 1998.
- Beyond this Point. Toronto: McClelland & Stewart, 2006.
- South of Elfrida. Victoria: Brindle & Glass, 2013.
