= Scott Stevens (disambiguation) =

Scott Stevens (born 1964) is a former NHL defenceman.

Scott Stevens may also refer to:

- Scott Stevens (footballer) (born 1982), Australian rules footballer
- Scott Stevens (singer), American songwriter, producer, singer and instrumentalist

== See also ==
- Scott Stephens, American television producer
- Scott Stephens, Australian radio presenter on RN Drive
