= Inclusive Design Research Centre =

OCAD University research centre

- Parent institution: OCAD University
- Founder: Jutta Treviranus
- Established: September 1994
- Focus: Inclusive design in an information and communications technology context
- Director: Jutta Treviranus
- Staff: 20
- Formerly called: Adaptive Technology Resource Centre
- Address: 205 Richmond Street West, Level 2
- Location: Toronto, Canada
- Website: idrc.ocadu.ca

The Inclusive Design Research Centre (IDRC) is a research and development centre at OCAD University in Toronto, Canada. The centre defines inclusive design as that which "considers the full range of human diversity with respect to ability, language, culture, gender, age and other forms of human difference." The research centre is directed by Jutta Treviranus. In 2011 the centre launched a Master of Design in Inclusive Design.

== Current Projects ==
The IDRC supports open standards, open access, and open source technology wherever possible in order to maximize distribution and to encourage broad participation. Some of the new initiatives the IDRC is working on are:

FLOE Project: Flexible Learning for Open Education. FLOE is intended to enable inclusive access to personally relevant, engaging learning opportunities for the full diversity of learners and content producers. For example, Users can customize the look and feel and presentation of web content to meet their unique needs and preferences through FLOE User Interface Options. In addition, the FLOE video player allows multiple language caption support, synchronized and navigable transcripts, and is fully accessible via keyboard control, and screen reader.

ADOD Project: Accessible Digital Office Document. ADOD is developing vendor-neutral manual with practical application-specific instructions that can help users choose accessible office applications and create accessible documents from common office application suites. The guidance is based primarily on WCAG 2.0 and ATAG 1.0 recommendations of the W3C. ADOD is being developed in partnership with UNESCO and the Ontario Ministry of Community and Social Services.

AEGIS Ontario: Integrating Accessibility into Emerging ICT. The ÆGIS Ontario project is devoted to ensuring that emerging information and communication technologies (ICT) are designed inclusively, thereby supporting Ontario's commitment to equal access and preparing Ontario's ICT businesses to meet the growing global demand for products and services that provide accessibility to people of all abilities. The project is funded by the Ontario Research Fund Research Excellence program, and is working in close partnership with AEGIS Europe.

== Inclusive Design Institute ==
The Inclusive Design Institute (IDI) is a related enterprise, housed in the same facilities as the IDRC, that serves as a regional research network for inclusive design. Also directed by Treviranus, It was founded in 2008 and officially launched on 24 May 2012, with the aim to "address the challenge of designing our information and communication systems (ICT) so that they work for all potential users, including users with disabilities, varying language needs and diverse cultural preferences." It consists of eight core postsecondary partners (OCAD University, University of Toronto, Ryerson University, York University, University of Ontario Institute of Technology, Sheridan College, George Brown College and Seneca College) and over 100 collaborating organizations, and is funded by the Canada Foundation for Innovation and the Ontario Ministry of Research and Innovation. Thirty-five academics from the participating institutions are affiliated with the institute.

== Definition of inclusive design ==
Some research centres that use the term "inclusive design" do so synonymously with the older field of universal design. Both inclusive design and universal design seek to design systems "... so that work for people with disabilities results in systems that work better for everyone [and] increase the human capacity to meet legal, policy and societal commitments to accessibility, diversity and inclusion at a local, national and global level." The IDRC, however, presents a definition of inclusive Design that has key differences from universal design and its own distinctive features. Inclusive design principles are intended to make universal design more fully inclusive, according to the centre.

Universal design grew out of industrial and architectural design whereas inclusive design came out of the digital world. Greater design options allow inclusive design to produce one-size-fits-one solutions in contrast to universal design that features one-size-fits-all and may exclude outliers such as the multifaceted people with various disabilities. Notes the IDRC: "while universal design is about creating a common design that works for everyone, we [in inclusive design] have the freedom to create a design system that can adapt, morph, or stretch to address each design need presented by each individual." Researchers in inclusive design believe that every user of any system, be it digital or policy, must be recognized as unique and that "it is the responsibility of inclusive designers to be aware of the context and broader impact of any design and strive to effect a beneficial impact beyond the intended beneficiary of the design."

Treviranus, the IDRC head, has led a body of research investigating and developing a new approach to accessibility: reframing disability as a mismatch between the needs of the user and the environment or system offered (and therefore not a personal trait but a consequence of the relationship between the individual and their environment). This technical and conceptual framework takes advantage of the plasticity of information and communications technology (ICT) systems to personally optimize the user interface to the needs and preferences of each individual. This approach supports human diversity in digital systems not by attempting to find a one-size-fits-all solution but by adapting to the cluster of diverse needs of each user.

== Jutta Treviranus ==
Director of both the IDRC and IDI, Jutta Treviranus is a world expert in the field of inclusive design who has made appearances at the White House and United Nations. She has "led many international multi‐partner research networks that have created broadly implemented technical innovations that support inclusion." Her work has included designing open source content and helping implement accessibility legislation, standards, and specifications.

In 2013 Treviranus was awarded the Queen's Diamond Jubilee Medal. In the same year, the International Electrotechnical Commission awarded Treviranus their International 1906 Award; it recognizes experts' contributions to the field.

== Awards and distinctions ==
- 2011 Platinum Learning Impact Leadership Award, IMS Global Learning Consortium for A-Tutor
- 2009 Delegates Web Accessibility Challenge Award, WWW/W4A Conference, Madrid for A-Tutor & AccessForAll.
- 2008 Gold Learning Impact Award, IMS Global Learning Consortium for A-Tutor
- 2008 Learning Impact Leadership Award, IMS Global Learning Consortium for Fluid Project
- 2008 Learning Impact Leadership Award, IMS Global Learning Consortium for Transformable
