= Donna Jodhan =

Canadian plaintiff

Donna Jodhan is a Canadian activist best known for her involvement in a Federal Court of Canada case whose verdict compelled the Canadian Government to make all of their websites accessible. On November 29, 2010 the Federal Court of Canada released a landmark decision concerning the right of Canadians with disabilities to access government websites.

The disability community was disappointed when the Federal Government took the case to the Federal Court of Appeal. On May 30, 2012 the case between the Attorney General of Canada and Donna Jodhan and the Alliance for Equality of Blind Canadians was upheld by the Supreme Court.

She was represented by David Baker who successfully leveraged the Charter of Rights and Freedoms and the Human Rights Code to see that accessibility is part of the Government of Canada's tendering process

Jodhan is one of the first blind people in Canada to earn an MBA.

She is the president of Barrier-Free Canada which works to strengthen Canadian federal accessibility laws like the Accessible Canada Act and the AODA.
