= HoTMetaL =

HTML editor software

HoTMetaL Pro 6
- Developer: SoftQuad Software
- Stable release: 6.0
- Operating system: Windows 9x, Windows NT 4, System 6
- Type: HTML editor
- License: Proprietary
- Website: www.hotmetalpro.com

HoTMetaL is an early commercial HTML-authoring software program, released in 1994 by SoftQuad Software of Toronto, Canada.

Based on the SGML engine of SoftQuad Author/Editor, HoTMetaL was released with a free version (HoTMetal Free) and a professional version (HoTMetaL Pro). There was also a "light" version. It received PC Magazine's Editors' Choice Award in 1995 as well as a variety of other awards.

However, the port to the Mac platform was regarded as poorly executed.

HoTMetaL went through several incarnations from versions 1 though 6. The Macintosh version survived until at least version 3. Eventually, the product line was discontinued as an HTML editor, although the user interface lives on in XMetaL, a commercial XML editor.

The editor had several views (including text and WYSIWYG), most notably the "Tags-On" view. This provided a WYSIWYG-like view of the page being edited with overlay icons showing where the code tags started and ended. This view is still used in the XML editing module of Adobe InDesign.

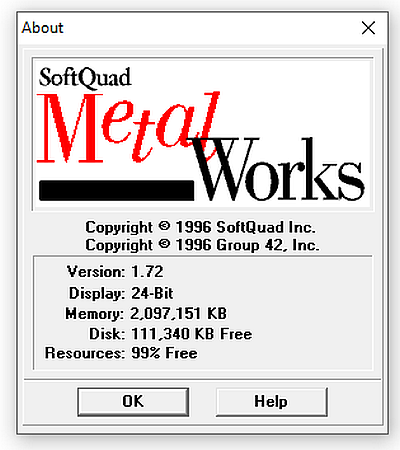
"About" popup window for SoftQuad's MetalWorks image editor.

HoTMetaL was bundled with MetalWorks, a rudimentary image-editing program that performed basic tasks such as cropping, resizing, and reducing the number of colors in an image.

On 15 March 2002, the Corel Corporation acquired SoftQuad, although the Corel website has no reference to HoTMetaL or any other web development tools.

During the development of SGI's WebForce line, SGI considered having SoftQuad port HoTMetaL Pro to IRIX for inclusion on the WebForce version of the Indy workstation.

While pitching the idea of WebForce to SGI executives, SGI employee John McCrea passed around a copy of HoTMetaL Pro in its retail packaging. SGI eventually opted to purchase and port a partially finished HTML editor, then in development for Solaris from Amdahl Corporation instead.

== The name ==
The capital letters in HoTMetaL spell HTML. The term comes from hot metal typesetting which involves melting alloys into the shape of letters so they can be used by Linotype machines to print words on paper.

== See also ==
- Hotmail - originally named as HoTMaiL with its capital letters spelled as HTML.
