= Blast Radius =

1998 video game

- North American box art
- Developer: Psygnosis Camden
- Publisher: Psygnosis
- Producer: Richard Underhill
- Programmer: Andrew Fitter
- Artist: Mark Brown
- Platform: PlayStation
- Release: EU: July 1998; NA: 28 February 1999
- Genre: Space combat simulator
- Mode: Single-player

Blast Radius is a 1998 space combat simulator video game developed and published by Psygnosis for the PlayStation.

== Reception ==
Reception

Aggregate score
| Aggregator | Score |
|---|---|
| GameRankings | 61% |

Review scores
| Publication | Score |
|---|---|
| AllGame | 3/5 |
| Edge | 6/10 |
| Electronic Gaming Monthly | 4.5/10 (Note: In Electronic Gaming Monthly's review of the game, two critics gave it a 4/10, one a 4.5/10 and another 5.5/10.) |
| Game Informer | 7/10 |
| GameFan | (J.W.) 79% 70% (Note: In GameFan's viewpoint of the game, one critic gave it 75, one 79, and another 55.) |
| GamePro | 2.5/5 (Note: GamePro gave the game 2.5/5 for overall fun factor, 4.5/5 for control, and two 4/5 scores for graphics and sound.) |
| GameRevolution | D+ |
| GameSpot | 7.2/10 |
| Hyper | 82% |
| IGN | 6/10 |
| Next Generation | 1/5 |
| PlayStation Official Magazine – UK | 8/10 |
| Official U.S. PlayStation Magazine | 3.5/5 |

The game received "mixed or average" reviews according to the review aggregation website GameRankings. Next Generation said, "It doesn't matter how much of a space-fighter fan you are, Blast Radius is just plain bad."
