= Disability discrimination act =

Stock short title used for legislation

In the late 20th and early 21st centuries, a number of countries have passed laws aimed at reducing discrimination against people with disabilities. These laws have begun to appear as the notion of civil rights has become more influential globally, and follow other forms of anti-discrimination and equal opportunity legislation aimed at preventing racial discrimination and sexism which began to emerge in the second half of the 20th century. Many of these Acts aim to reduce barriers for persons with disabilities in the areas of customer service, employment, built environment, transportation, and information and communications.

== List of disability discrimination acts ==
- Australia: Disability Discrimination Act 1992
  - Australian Capital Territory – Discrimination Act 1991
  - New South Wales – Anti-Discrimination Act 1977
  - Northern Territory – Anti-Discrimination Act 1992
  - Queensland – Anti-Discrimination Act 1991
  - South Australia – Equal Opportunity Act 1984
  - Tasmania – Anti-Discrimination Act 1998
  - Victoria – Equal Opportunity Act 2010
  - Western Australia – Equal Opportunity Act 1984
- Barbados: Rights of Persons with Disabilities Act, 2025
- Cambodia: Law on the Protection and the Promotion of the Rights of Persons with Disabilities
- Canada: Accessible Canada Act
  - British Columbia: Accessible British Columbia Act
  - Manitoba: Accessibility for Manitobans Act
  - Ontario: Accessibility for Ontarians with Disabilities Act, 2005
  - New Brunswick: Accessibility Act (New Brunswick)
  - Newfoundland and Labrador: Accessibility Act (Newfoundland and Labrador)
  - Nova Scotia: Accessibility Act (Nova Scotia)
  - Prince Edward Island: Supports for Persons with Disabilities Act (Prince Edward Island)
  - Quebec: Act to secure handicapped persons in the exercise of their rights with a view to achieving social, school and workplace integration
  - Saskatchewan: Accessible Saskatchewan Act
- Hong Kong : Disability Discrimination Ordinance 1995 (see Disability Discrimination Act 1995 below)
- Jamaica: Disabilities Act, 2014
- Nigeria: Discrimination Against Persons with Disabilities (Prohibition) Act 2018
- Pakistan: National Policy for Persons with Disabilities 2002
- South Africa: Promotion of Equality and Prevention of Unfair Discrimination Act, 2000
- South Korea: Prohibition of Discrimination Against Persons with Disabilities, 2008
- Switzerland: Disability Discrimination Act (2002)
- United Kingdom
  - Northern Ireland: Disability Discrimination Act 1995 (c. 50), Disability Discrimination (Northern Ireland) Order 2006 (SI 2006/312)
  - Great Britain: Equality Act 2010 (c. 15) (prior to October 2010 the relevant legislation was the Disability Discrimination Act 1995 as amended)
- United States of America: Americans with Disabilities Act of 1990

== See also ==
- Ableism
- Disability rights movement
- Equal opportunity
