= Web accessibility =

Accessibility of World Wide Web

Web accessibility, or eAccessibility, is the inclusive practice of ensuring there are no barriers that prevent interaction with, or access to, websites on the World Wide Web by people with disabilities, including both physical and mental disabilities. Through the curb cut effect, it also benefits people with situational disabilities and those with socio-economic restrictions on bandwidth and speed. When sites are correctly designed, developed and edited, more users have equal access to information and functionality.

For example, when a site is coded with semantically meaningful HTML, with textual equivalents provided for images and with links named meaningfully, this helps blind users using text-to-speech software or text-to-Braille hardware. When text and images are large or enlargeable, it is easier for users with poor sight to read and understand the content. When links are underlined (or otherwise differentiated) as well as colored, this ensures that color blind users will be able to notice them. When clickable links and areas are large, this helps users who cannot control a mouse with precision. When pages are not coded in a way that hinders navigation by means of the keyboard alone, or a single switch access device alone, this helps users who cannot use a mouse or even a standard keyboard. When videos are closed captioned, chaptered, or a sign language version is available, deaf and hard-of-hearing users can understand the video. When flashing effects are avoided or made optional, users prone to seizures caused by these effects are not put at risk. Additionally, when content is written in plain language and illustrated with instructional diagrams and animations, users with dyslexia and learning difficulties are better able to understand the content. Accessibility considerations have increasingly been incorporated into website builders such as Wix, Duda, and Webnode, which offer tools to help create more accessible web content. When sites are correctly built and maintained, all of these users can be accommodated without decreasing the usability of the site for non-disabled users.

The needs that web accessibility aims to address include:

- Visual: Visual impairments including blindness, various common types of low vision and poor eyesight, various types of color blindness;
- Motor/mobility: e.g. difficulty or inability to use the hands, including tremors, muscle slowness, loss of fine muscle control, etc., due to conditions such as Parkinson's disease, muscular dystrophy, cerebral palsy, stroke;
- Auditory: Deafness or hearing impairments, including individuals who are hard of hearing;
- Seizures: Photo epileptic seizures caused by visual strobe or flashing effects.
- Cognitive and intellectual: Developmental disabilities, learning difficulties (dyslexia, dyscalculia, etc.), and cognitive disabilities (PTSD, Alzheimer's) of various origins, affecting memory, attention, developmental "maturity", problem-solving and logic skills, etc.

Accessibility is not confined to the list above; rather, it extends to anyone who is experiencing any permanent, temporary or situational disability. Situational disability refers to someone who may be experiencing a boundary based on the current experience. For example, a person may be situationally one-handed if they are carrying a baby. Web accessibility should be mindful of users experiencing a wide variety of barriers. According to a 2018 WebAIM global survey of web accessibility practitioners, close to 93% of survey respondents received no formal schooling on web accessibility.

== Assistive technologies used for web browsing ==
Individuals living with a disability use assistive technologies such as the following to enable and assist web browsing:

- Screen reader software, which can read out, using synthesized speech, either selected elements of what is being displayed on the monitor (helpful for users with reading or learning difficulties), or which can read out everything that is happening on the computer (used by blind and vision impaired users).
- Braille terminals, consisting of a refreshable braille display which renders text as braille characters (usually by means of raising pegs through holes in a flat surface) and either a mainstream keyboard or a braille keyboard.
- Screen magnification software, which enlarges what is displayed on the computer monitor, making it easier to read for vision impaired users.
- Speech recognition software that can accept spoken commands to the computer, or turn dictation into grammatically correct text – useful for those who have difficulty using a mouse or a keyboard.
- Keyboard overlays, which can make typing easier or more accurate for those who have motor control difficulties.
- Access to subtitled or sign language videos for deaf people.

== Guidelines on accessible web design ==
=== Web Content Accessibility Guidelines ===
In 1999 the Web Accessibility Initiative, a project by the World Wide Web Consortium (W3C), published the Web Content Accessibility Guidelines WCAG 1.0.

On 11 December 2008, the WAI released the WCAG 2.0 as a Recommendation. WCAG 2.0 aims to be up to date and more technology neutral. Though web designers can choose either standard to follow, the WCAG 2.0 have been widely accepted as the definitive guidelines on how to create accessible websites. Governments are steadily adopting the WCAG 2.0 as the accessibility standard for their own websites. In 2012, the Web Content Accessibility Guidelines were also published as an ISO/IEC standard: "ISO/IEC 40500:2012: Information technology – W3C Web Content Accessibility Guidelines (WCAG) 2.0". In 2018, the WAI released the WCAG 2.1 Recommendation that extends WCAG 2.0.

==== Criticism of WAI guidelines ====
There has been some criticism of the W3C process, claiming that it does not sufficiently put the user at the heart of the process. There was a formal objection to WCAG's original claim that WCAG 2.0 will address requirements for people with learning disabilities and cognitive limitations headed by Lisa Seeman and signed by 40 organizations and people, arguing that while the outlined set of guidelines could be of some benefit to users with such disabilities, it did not go far enough to sufficiently address their needs and could cause issues with developers relying solely on the outlines of WCAG 2.0 to ensure accessibility. In articles such as "WCAG 2.0: The new W3C guidelines evaluated", "To Hell with WCAG 2.0" and "Testability Costs Too Much", the WAI has been criticised for allowing WCAG 1.0 to get increasingly out of step with today's technologies and techniques for creating and consuming web content, for the slow pace of development of WCAG 2.0, for making the new guidelines difficult to navigate and understand, and other argued failings.

== Guidelines for different components ==
=== Authoring Tool Accessibility Guidelines (ATAG) ===
- ATAG contains 28 checkpoints that provide guidance on:
  - producing accessible output that meets standards and guidelines
  - promoting the content author for accessibility-related information
  - providing ways of checking and correcting inaccessible content
  - integrating accessibility in the overall look and feel
  - making the authoring tool itself accessible to people with disabilities

=== Web Content Accessibility Guidelines (WCAG) ===
- WCAG 1.0: 14 guidelines that are general principles of accessible design
- WCAG 2.0: 4 principles that form the foundation for web accessibility; 12 guidelines (untestable) that are goals for which authors should aim; and 65 testable success criteria. The W3C's Techniques for WCAG 2.0 is a list of techniques that support authors to meet the guidelines and success criteria. The techniques are periodically updated whereas the principles, guidelines and success criteria are stable and do not change.

=== User Agent Accessibility Guidelines (UAAG) ===
- UAAG contains a comprehensive set of checkpoints that cover:
  - access to all content
  - user control over how content is rendered
  - user control over the user interface
  - standard programming interfaces

== Web accessibility legislation ==
Because of the growth in internet usage and its growing importance in everyday life, countries around the world are addressing digital access issues through legislation. One approach is to protect access to websites for people with disabilities by using existing human or civil rights legislation. Some countries, like the U.S., protect access for people with disabilities through the technology procurement process. It is common for nations to support and adopt the Web Content Accessibility Guidelines (WCAG) 2.0 by referring to the guidelines in their legislation. Compliance with web accessibility guidelines is a legal requirement primarily in North America, Europe, parts of South America and parts of Asia.

=== Argentina ===
Law 26.653 on Accessibility to Information on Web Pages. Approved by the National Congress of Argentina on November 3, 2010. It specifies in its Article 1 that both the National State and its decentralized organisms or those companies that are related in any way with public services or goods, must respect the rules and requirements on accessibility in the design of their web pages. The objective is to facilitate access to contents to all persons with disabilities, in order to guarantee equal opportunities in relation to access to information and to avoid discrimination.

In addition, by Decree 656/2019 the regulation of the aforementioned Law No. 26,653 is approved and it is reported that the authority in charge of its application will be the ONTI, "Oficina Nacional de Tecnologías de Información" (National Office of Information Technologies). This agency is in charge of assisting and/or advising the individuals and legal entities reached by this Law; in addition to disseminating, approving/updating and also controlling the fulfillment of the accessibility standards and requirements of the web pages; among other functions.

=== Australia ===
In 2000, an Australian blind man won a $20,000 court case against the Sydney Organising Committee of the Olympic Games (SOCOG). This was the first successful case under Disability Discrimination Act 1992 because SOCOG had failed to make their official website, Sydney Olympic Games, adequately accessible to blind users. The Human Rights and Equal Opportunity Commission (HREOC) also published World Wide Web Access: Disability Discrimination Act Advisory Notes. All Governments in Australia also have policies and guidelines that require accessible public websites.

=== Brazil ===
In Brazil, the federal government published a paper with guidelines for accessibility on 18 January 2005, for public reviewing. On 14 December 2005, the second version was published, including suggestions made to the first version of the paper. On 7 May 2007, the accessibility guidelines of the paper became compulsory to all federal websites. The current version of the paper, which follows the WCAG 2.0 guidelines, is named e-MAG, for Modelo de Acessibilidade de Governo Eletrônico (Electronic Government Accessibility Model), and is maintained by Brazilian Ministry of Planning, Budget, and Management.

The paper can be viewed and downloaded at its official website.

=== Canada ===
In 2011, the Government of Canada began phasing in the implementation of a new set of web standards that are aimed at ensuring government websites are accessible, usable, interoperable and optimized for mobile devices. These standards replace Common Look and Feel 2.0 (CLF 2.0) Standards for the Internet.

The first of these four standards, Standard on Web Accessibility came into full effect on 31 July 2013. The Standard on Web Accessibility follows the Web Content Accessibility Guidelines (WCAG) 2.0 AA, and contains a list of exclusions that is updated annually. It is accompanied by an explicit Assessment Methodology that helps government departments comply. The government also developed the Web Experience Toolkit (WET), a set of reusable web components for building innovative websites. The WET helps government departments build innovative websites that are accessible, usable and interoperable and therefore comply with the government's standards. The WET toolkit is open source and available for anyone to use.

The three related web standards are: the Standard on Optimizing Websites and Applications for Mobile Devices, the Standard on Web Usability, and the Standard on Web Interoperability.

In 2019 the Government of Canada passed the Accessible Canada Act. This builds on the on provincial legislation like the Accessibility for Ontarians with Disabilities Act, The Accessibility for Manitobans Act and the Nova Scotia Accessibility Act.

=== European Union ===
In February 2014, a draft law was endorsed by the European Parliament stating that all websites managed by public sector bodies have to be made accessible to everyone.

A European Commission Communication on eAccessibility was published on 13 September 2005. The commission's aim to "harmonise and facilitate the public procurement of accessible ICT products and services" was embedded in a mandate issued to CEN, CENELEC and ETSI in December 2005, reference M 376. A mandate is a request for the drafting and adoption of a European standard or European standardisation deliverables issued to one or more of the European standardisation organisations. Mandates are usually accepted by the standardisation organisation because they are based on preliminary consultation, although technically the organisation is independent and has a right to decline the mandate. The mandate also called for the development of an electronic toolkit for public procurers enabling them to have access to the resulting harmonised requirements. The commission also noted that the harmonised outcome, while intended for public procurement purposes, might also be useful for procurement in the private sector.

On 26 October 2016, the European Parliament approved the Web Accessibility Directive, which requires that the websites and mobile apps of public sector bodies be accessible. The relevant accessibility requirements are described in the European standard EN 301 549 V3.2.1 (published by ETSI). EU member states were expected to bring into force by 23 September 2018 laws and regulations that enforce the relevant accessibility requirements:

- websites of public sector bodies should comply by 23 September 2018
- mobile apps by 23 June 2021

Some categories of websites and apps are excepted from the directive, for example "websites and mobile applications of public service broadcasters and their subsidiaries".

The European Commission's "Rolling Plan for ICT Standardisation 2017" notes that ETSI standard EN 301 549 V1.1.2 will need to be updated to add accessibility requirements for mobile applications and evaluation methodologies to test compliance with the standard.

In 2019 the European Union introduced the European Accessibility Act, as one of the leading pieces of legislation for digital accessibility and digital inclusion. The European Accessibility Act (EAA), which will enter into force on 28 June 2025, requiring companies to ensure that the newly marketed products and services covered by the Act are accessible. All websites will need to adhere to the WCAG Principles of Perceivable, Operable, Understandable and Robust, and deliver comparative levels of user experience to disabled customers. As of June 28, 2025, customers will be able to file complaints before national courts or authorities if services or products do not respect the new rules.

=== India ===
In India, National Informatics Centre (NIC), under Ministry of Electronics and Information Technology (MeitY) has passed Guidelines for Indian Government Websites (GIGW) for government agencies in 2009, compelling them to adhere to WCAG 2.0 Level A standards.

Ministry of Electronics and Information Technology (MeitY) has National Policy on Universal Electronic Accessibility clearly stated, Accessibility Standards and Guidelines be formulated or adapted from prevailing standards in the domain including World Wide Web Consortium accessibility Web standards and guidelines such as Authoring Tool Accessibility Guidelines (ATAG), Web Content Accessibility Guidelines (WCAG 2.0) and User Agent Accessibility Guidelines (UAAG).

GIGW aims to ensure the quality and accessibility of government guidelines by offering guidance on desirable practices covering the entire lifecycle of websites, web portals and web applications, right from conceptualization and design to their development, maintenance and management. The Department of Administrative Reforms and Public Grievances made the same a part of the Central Secretariat Manual of Office Procedure.

GIGW 3.0 also significantly enhances the guidance on the accessibility and usability of mobile apps, especially by offering specific guidance to government organizations on how to leverage public digital infrastructure devised for whole-of-government delivery of services, benefits and information.

The Rights of Persons with Disabilities Act, 2016 (RPwD) passed in parliament. The law replaced earlier legislation and provided clearer guidance for digital accessibility. The RPwD Act, 106 through Sections 40-46 mandates accessibility to be ensured in all public-centric buildings, transportation systems, Information and Communication Technology (ICT) services, consumer products and all other services being provided by the Government or other service providers.

=== Ireland ===
In Ireland, the Disability Act 2005 requires that where a public body communicates in electronic form with one or more persons, the contents of the communication must be, as far as practicable, "accessible to persons with a visual impairment to whom adaptive technology is available" (Section 28(2)). The National Disability Authority has produced a Code of Practice giving guidance to public bodies on how to meet the obligations of the Act. This is an approved code of practice and its provisions have the force of legally binding statutory obligations. It states that a public body can achieve compliance with Section 28(2) by "reviewing existing practices for electronic communications in terms of accessibility against relevant guidelines and standards", giving the example of "Double A conformance with the Web Accessibility Initiative's (WAI) Web Content Accessibility Guidelines (WCAG)".

=== Israel ===
In 2014, the Israeli Ministry of Justice published regulations requiring Internet websites to comply with Israeli standard 5568, which is based on the W3C Web Content Accessibility Guidelines 2.0. The main differences between the Israeli standard and the W3C standard concern the requirements to provide captions and texts for audio and video media. The Israeli standards are somewhat more lenient, reflecting the current technical difficulties in providing such captions and texts in Hebrew.

=== Italy ===
In Italy, web accessibility is ruled by the so-called "Legge Stanca" (Stanca Act), formally Act n.4 of 9 January 2004, officially published on the Gazzetta Ufficiale on 17 January 2004. The original Stanca Act was based on the WCAG 1.0. On 20 March 2013 the standards required by the Stanca Act were updated to the WCAG 2.0.

=== Japan ===
Web Content Accessibility Guidelines in Japan were established in 2004 as JIS (Japanese Industrial Standards) X 8341–3. JIS X 8341-3 was revised in 2010 as JIS X 8341-3:2010 to encompass WCAG 2.0, and it was revised in 2016 as JIS X 8341-3:2016 to be identical standards with the international standard ISO/IEC 40500:2012. The Japanese organization WAIC (Web Accessibility Infrastructure Committee) has published the history and structure of JIS X 8341-3:2016.

=== Malta ===
In Malta Web Content Accessibility assessments were carried out by the Foundation for Information Technology Accessibility (FITA) since 2003. Until 2018, this was done in conformance with the requirements of the Equal Opportunities Act (2000) CAP 43 and applied WACG guidelines. With the advent of the EU Web Accessibility Directive the Malta Communications Authority was charged with ensuring the accessibility of online resources owned by Maltese public entities. FITA continues to provide ICT accessibility assessments to public and commercial entities, applying standard EN301549 and WCAG 2.1 as applicable. Therefore, both the Equal Opportunities Act anti-discrimination legislation and the transposed EU Web Accessibility Directive are applicable to the Maltese scenario.

=== Norway ===
In Norway, web accessibility is a legal obligation under the Act 20 June 2008 No 42 relating to a prohibition against discrimination on the basis of disability, also known as the Anti-discrimination Accessibility Act. The Act went into force in 2009, and the Ministry of Government Administration, Reform and Church Affairs [Fornyings-, administrasjons- og kirkedepartementet] published the Regulations for universal design of information and communication technology (ICT) solutions [Forskrift om universell utforming av informasjons- og kommunikasjonsteknologiske (IKT)-løsninger] in 2013. The regulations require compliance with Web Content Accessibility Guidelines 2.0 (WCAG 2.0) / NS / ISO / IEC 40500: 2012, level A and AA with some exceptions. The Norwegian Agency for Public Management and eGovernment (Difi) is responsible for overseeing that ICT solutions aimed at the general public are in compliance with the legislative and regulatory requirements.

=== Philippines ===
As part of the Web Accessibility Initiatives in the Philippines, the government through the National Council for the Welfare of Disabled Persons (NCWDP) board approved the recommendation of forming an ad hoc or core group of webmasters that will help in the implementation of the Biwako Millennium Framework set by the UNESCAP.

The Philippines was also the place where the Interregional Seminar and Regional Demonstration Workshop on Accessible Information and Communications Technologies (ICT) to Persons with Disabilities was held where eleven countries from the Asia-Pacific region were represented. The Manila Accessible Information and Communications Technologies Design Recommendations was drafted and adopted in 2003.

=== Spain ===
In Spain, UNE 139803:2012 is the norm entrusted to regulate web accessibility. This standard is based on Web Content Accessibility Guidelines 2.0.

=== Sweden ===
In Sweden, Verva, the Swedish Administrative Development Agency is responsible for a set of guidelines for Swedish public sector web sites. Through the guidelines, web accessibility is presented as an integral part of the overall development process and not as a separate issue. The Swedish guidelines contain criteria which cover the entire life cycle of a website; from its conception to the publication of live web content. These criteria address several areas which should be considered, including:

- accessibility
- usability
- web standards
- privacy issues
- information architecture
- developing content for the web
- Content Management Systems (CMS) / authoring tools selection.
- development of web content for mobile devices.

An English translation was released in April 2008: Swedish National Guidelines for Public Sector Websites. The translation is based on the latest version of Guidelines which was released in 2006.

=== United Kingdom ===
In the UK, the Equality Act 2010 does not refer explicitly to website accessibility, but makes it illegal to discriminate against people with disabilities. The Act applies to anyone providing a service; public, private and voluntary sectors. The Code of Practice: Rights of Access – Goods, Facilities, Services and Premises document published by the government's Equality and Human Rights Commission to accompany the Act does refer explicitly to websites as one of the "services to the public" which should be considered covered by the Act.

In December 2010 the UK released the standard BS 8878:2010 Web accessibility. Code of practice. This standard effectively supersedes PAS 78 (pub. 2006). PAS 78, produced by the Disability Rights Commission and usable by disabled people. The standard has been designed to introduce non-technical professionals to improved accessibility, usability and user experience for disabled and older people. It will be especially beneficial to anyone new to this subject as it gives guidance on process, rather than on technical and design issues. BS 8878 is consistent with the Equality Act 2010 and is referenced in the UK government's e-Accessibility Action Plan as the basis of updated advice on developing accessible online services. It includes recommendations for:

- Involving disabled people in the development process and using automated tools to assist with accessibility testing
- The management of the guidance and process for upholding existing accessibility guidelines and specifications.

BS 8878 is intended for anyone responsible for the policies covering web product creation within their organization, and governance against those policies. It additionally assists people responsible for promoting and supporting equality and inclusion initiatives within organizations and people involved in the procurement, creation or training of web products and content. A summary of BS 8878 is available to help organisations better understand how the standard can help them embed accessibility and inclusive design in their business-as-usual processes.

On 28 May 2019, BS 8878 was superseded by ISO 30071-1, the international Standard that built on BS 8878 and expanded it for international use. A summary of how ISO 30071-1 relates to BS 8878 is available to help organisations understand the new Standard.

On April 9, National Rail replaced its blue and white aesthetic with a black and white theme, which was criticized for not conforming to the Web Content Accessibility Guidelines. The company restored the blue and white theme and said it is investing in modernising its website in accords to the latest accessibility guidelines.

In 2019 new accessibility regulations came into force setting a legal duty for public sector bodies to publish accessibility statements and make their websites accessible by 23 September 2020 Accessibility statements include information about how the website was tested and the organisation's plan to fix any accessibility problems. Statements should be published and linked to on every page on the website.

=== European Accessibility Act ===
The European Accessibility Act (Directive (EU) 2019/882) entered into application on 28 June 2025, harmonising accessibility requirements for a range of digital products and services sold within the European Union, including e-commerce, banking, e-books, transport, and telecommunications. Although the United Kingdom left the European Union before the deadline, the directive continues to apply to UK businesses that supply covered products or services to EU consumers, irrespective of the supplier’s country of establishment. Microenterprises with fewer than 10 employees and an annual turnover below €2 million are exempt from some of the requirements.

=== United States ===
In the United States, Section 508 Amendment to the Rehabilitation Act of 1973 requires all Federal agencies' electronic and information technology to be accessible to those with disabilities. Both members of the public and federal employees have the right to access this technology, such as computer hardware and software, websites, phone systems, and copiers. Also, Section 504 of the Rehabilitation Act prohibits discrimination on the basis of disability for entities receiving federal funds and has been cited in multiple lawsuits against organizations such as hospitals that receive federal funds through medicare/medicaid.

In addition, Title III of the Americans with Disabilities Act (ADA) prohibits discrimination on the basis of disability. There is some debate on the matter; multiple courts and the U.S. Department of Justice have taken the position that the ADA requires website and app operators and owners to take affirmative steps to make their websites and apps accessible to disabled persons and compatible with common assistive technologies such as the JAWS screen reader, while other courts have taken the position that the ADA does not apply online. The U.S. Department of Justice has endorsed the WCAG2.0AA standard as an appropriate standard for accessibility in multiple settlement agreements.

Numerous lawsuits challenging websites and mobile apps on the basis of the ADA have been filed since 2017. These cases appears spurred by a 2017 case, Gil v. Winn Dixie Stores, in which a federal court in Florida ruled that Winn Dixie's website must be accessible. Around 800 cases related to web accessibility were filed in 2017, and over 2,200 were filed in 2018. Additionally, though the Justice Department had stated in 2010 that they would publish guidelines for web accessibility, they reversed this plan in 2017, also spurring legal action against inaccessible sites.

A notable lawsuit related to the ADA was filed against Domino's Pizza by a blind user who could not use Domino's mobile app. At the federal district level, the court ruled in favor of Domino's as the Justice Department had not established the guidelines for accessibility, but this was appealed to the Ninth Circuit. The Ninth Circuit overruled the district court, ruling that because Domino's is a brick-and-mortar store, which must meet the ADA, and the mobile app an extension of their services, their app must also be compliant with the ADA. Domino's petitioned to the Supreme Court, backed by many other restaurants and retail chains, arguing that this decision impacts their Due Process since disabled customers have other, more accessible means to order. In October 2019, the Supreme Court declined to hear the case, which effectively upheld the decision of the 9th Circuit Court and requires the case to be heard as it stands.

The number and cost of federal website accessibility lawsuits rose dramatically in 2018, climbing to a peak in 2022 before declining somewhat over the last couple years.

== Website accessibility audits ==
A growing number of organizations, companies and consultants offer website accessibility audits. These audits, a type of system testing, identify accessibility problems that exist within a website, and provide advice and guidance on the steps that need to be taken to correct these problems.

A range of methods are used to audit websites for accessibility:

- Automated tools can identify some of the problems that are present. Depending on the tool the result may vary widely making it difficult to compare test results.
- Expert technical reviewers, knowledgeable in web design technologies and accessibility, can review a representative selection of pages and provide detailed feedback and advice based on their findings.
- User testing, usually overseen by technical experts, involves setting tasks for ordinary users to carry out on the website, and reviewing the problems these users encounter as they try to carry out the tasks.

Each of these methods has its strengths and weaknesses:

- Automated tools can process many pages in a relatively short length of time, but can only identify a limited portion of the accessibility problems that might be present in the website.
- Technical expert review will identify many of the problems that exist, but the process is time-consuming, and many websites are too large to make it possible for a person to review every page.
- User testing combines elements of usability and accessibility testing, and is valuable for identifying problems that might otherwise be overlooked, but needs to be used knowledgeably to avoid the risk of basing design decisions on one user's preferences.

Ideally, a combination of methods should be used to assess the accessibility of a website.

== Accessible Web applications and WAI-ARIA ==
For a web page to be accessible all important semantics about the page's functionality must be available so that assistive technology can understand and process the content and adapt it for the user. However, as content becomes more and more complex, the standard HTML tags and attributes become inadequate in providing semantics reliably. Modern Web applications often apply scripts to elements to control their functionality and to enable them to act as a control or other dynamic component. These custom components or widgets do not provide a way to convey semantic information to the user agent. WAI-ARIA (Accessible Rich Internet Applications) is a specification published by the World Wide Web Consortium that specifies how to increase the accessibility of dynamic content and user interface components developed with Ajax, HTML, JavaScript and related technologies. ARIA enables accessibility by enabling the author to provide all the semantics to fully describe its supported behaviour. It also allows each element to expose its current states and properties and its relationships between other elements. Accessibility problems with the focus and tab index are also corrected.

== See also ==
- Accessible publishing
- Augmentative and alternative communication
- Blue Beanie Day
- Computer accessibility
- Device independence
- Digital divide
- European Internet Accessibility Observatory
- Knowbility
- Maguire v Sydney Organising Committee for the Olympic Games (2000)
- Multimodal interaction
- Progressive enhancement
- Universal design
- Web Accessibility Initiative
- Web engineering
- Web interoperability
- Web literacy
