= Deque Systems =

American digital accessibility company

- Type: Private Company
- Industry: Web Accessibility
- Headquarters: Herndon, VA
- Area served: Worldwide
- Key people: Preety Kumar (CEO)
- Website: www.deque.com

Deque Systems (/ˈdiːkjuː/ DEE-kew) is a digital accessibility company based in Herndon, Virginia with additional offices in Kavuri Hills Madhapur, Hyderabad India and Utrecht, The Netherlands.

== History ==
Former logo introduced in 2018.

The CEO of Deque Systems is Preety Kumar.

The company was started in 1999 and produces accessibility testing software in addition to offering accessibility consulting services and training.

In June, 2015 Deque open-sourced the accessibility rules engine Axe-core.

In May 2020, the WorldSpace brand name was retired and replaced by Axe for each of Deque's products.

In September 2020, Deque found that the majority of vote by mail applications were inaccessible, and fixed them for the 2020 Presidential Election.

In 2025, Deque was listed in the Leader category, first position, by Forrester Research in The Forrester Wave: Digital Accessibility Platforms, Q4 2025 report. In 2026, Deque was named a Leader, first position, by Gartner in The Magic Quadrant for Digital Accessibility.

== Products ==
Deque tools, services and training are used to achieve compliance in support of the W3C's Web Content Accessibility Guidelines, the Americans with Disabilities Act, Section 508, the European Accessibility Act, and EN 301 549.

Deque University is a collection of online accessibility training courses covering a range of topics from introductory level to expert-level International Association of Accessibility Professionals CPACC.

=== Axe Tools ===
Axe is a suite of accessibility testing tools for HTML, Android, and iOS applications. Each product in the Axe toolkit is powered by the open source rules engine Axe-core.

Products within the Axe suite include: Axe DevTools, Axe Monitor and Axe Auditor.
