= Accessibility Act (Newfoundland and Labrador) =

Newfoundland and Labrador provincial legislation

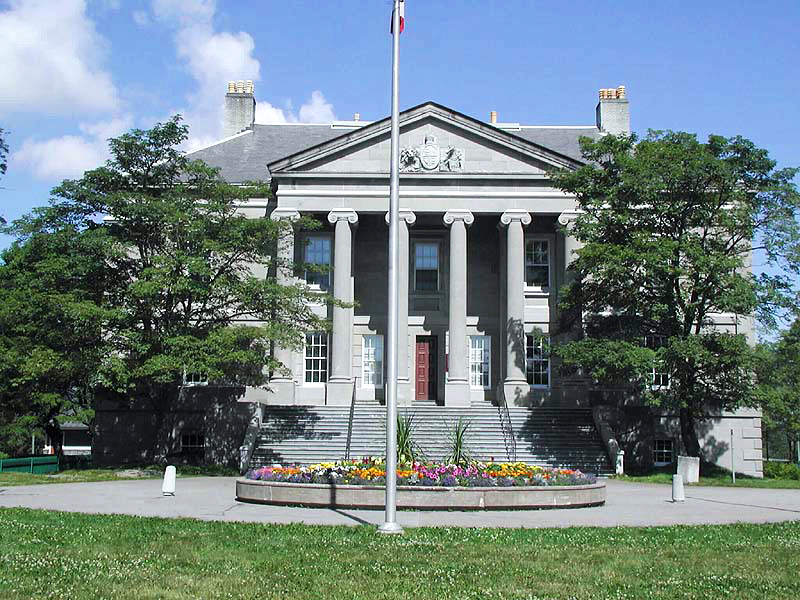

Newfoundland and Labrador House of Assembly
- Long title: An Act Respecting Accessibility in the Province
- Citation: S.N.L. 2021, c. A-1.001
- Assented to: November 4, 2021

Legislative history
- Bill citation: Bill 38
- Introduced by: John Abbott MHA, Minister of Children, Seniors and Social Development
- First reading: October 19, 2021
- Second reading: October 25, 2021
- Third reading: November 2, 2021
- Status: Current legislation

The Accessibility Act is an act introduced under the Minister of Children, Seniors and Social Development which became law on December 3, 2021. One of the key elements of the act is the creation of an Accessibility Standards Advisory Board. The act also creates a Disability Policy Office which works with all government departments and agencies.

The Bill is intended to:

- Establish accessibility standards to improve accessibility;
- Create an advisory board to make recommendations to the minister regarding accessibility standards;
- Require an individual, organization or public body that is subject to an accessibility standard to take actions to prevent barriers from being created and to identify and remove barriers;
- Ensure public bodies prepare accessibility plans every three years and make them publicly available; and
- Provide inspection and enforcement to enforce these standards.

The Disability Policy Office will:

- Support the implementation and administration of this Act and the regulations;
- Provide policy and communication support for this Act and the regulations;
- Support the development and implementation of public education and awareness on the purpose of this Act.
- Improve opportunities for persons with disabilities by examining and reviewing measures, policies, practices and other requirements;
- Identify and study issues of concern to persons with disabilities and recommend action where appropriate; and
- Provide administrative support for the Accessibility Standards Advisory Board.

== See also ==
- Accessible Canada Act for the corresponding Federal Canadian legislation.
- Ontarians with Disabilities Act for the corresponding Ontario provincial legislation.
- Nova Scotia Accessibility Act for the corresponding Nova Scotia provincial legislation.
- The Accessibility for Manitobans Act for the corresponding Manitoba provincial legislation.
- Accessible Saskatchewan Act for the corresponding Saskatchewan provincial legislation.
- Accessible British Columbia Act for the corresponding British Columbia provincial legislation.
- Disability Discrimination Act for the corresponding UK legislation.
- Americans with Disabilities Act of 1990 for the corresponding American federal legislation.
