= Disability in Canada =

Group in Canada

Common disabilities by age group
- Young aged 15-24
- Mental health: 68%
- Learning impairments: 46%
- Pain-related: 34%
- Adults aged 25-64
- Pain-related: 63%
- Mental health: 46%
- Flexibility issues: 36%
- Seniors 65 and older
- Pain-related: 68%
- Mobility issues: 63%
- Flexibility issues: 59%
- Note: Nearly 42% of seniors had four or more co-occurring disabilities, while 43% of youth and 36% of working-age adults had two or three types'

Disability in Canada affects approximately 8 million individuals aged 15 and older (27% of the population). According to the 2022 survey by Statistics Canada of those reporting a disability nearly 42% of seniors had four or more co-occurring disabilities, while 43% of youth and 36% of working-age adults had two or three types. The disability rate was higher for women (30%) compared to men (24%), consistent with past trends. In terms of severity of disabilities, about 59% of disabled persons were classified as having milder disabilities, while 41% had more severe disabilities.

Despite significant gains for people with disabilities in recent decades, there is historical and modern discrimination issues. From the late 1800s to the mid 20th century, Canadian immigration laws prohibited people who were perceived to have intellectual or developmental disabilities from entering the country. People with disabilities within Canada have faced institutionalization, involuntary sterilization, employment denialism and emotional and physical violence. Those with disabilities continue to have lower educational achievement, higher unemployment rates, thus are more likely to experience low income, and inadequate housing compared to those without disabilities. Findings show that 72% of people with disabilities encountered one or more accessibility barriers due to their condition.

Domestic legislation intended to protect disabled Canadians include the Charter of Rights and Freedoms, the Canadian Human Rights Act, and the Employment Equity Act. The Accessible Canada Act aims to create a barrier-free country by 2040. Internationally Canada is a signatory of the United Nations Convention on the Rights of Persons with Disabilities and meets regularly to address implementation of the convention's newest recommendations. Alongside social and financial support from federal and provincial governments, there are a multitude of fundamental rights organizations in Canada dedicated to assisting and advocating for individuals with disabilities beginning with the War Amps after the First World War. National disability rights organizations include the Council for Canadians with Disabilities (CCD), Disabled Women's Network Canada (DAWN), and Canadian Association for Community Living (CACL).

== Statistical data ==
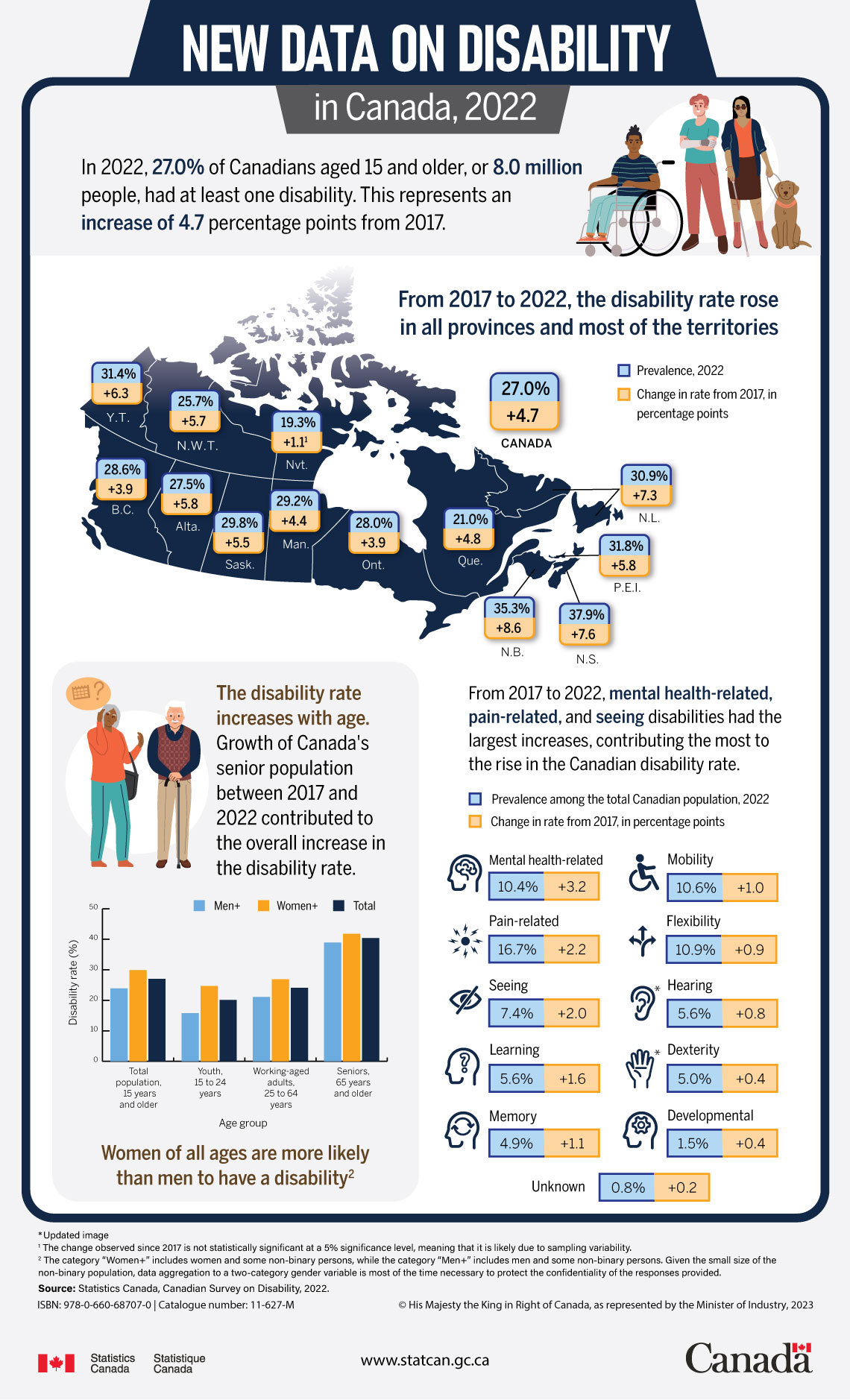

The 2022 Canadian Survey on Disability (CSD) showed that 27% of Canadians aged 15 years and older, or 8.0 million people, had one or more disabilities that limited them in their daily activities. The rate of disability in Canada has increased by 5 percentage points since 2017, when 22% of Canadians, or 6.2 million people, had one or more disabilities. This increase can be partially attributed to both the aging population and the large increase in mental health-related disabilities among youth and working-age adults. In 2022, the rate of disability was higher among women (30%) than men (24%), following the same pattern from 2017.

Among persons with a disability, the most common disability type in 2022, as it was in 2017, was pain-related disability; 62% of persons with a disability reported this type of disability (Chart 2). Flexibility (40%), mobility (39%) and mental health-related (39%) disabilities were the next most prevalent types of disability.The types of disability varied by age groups. Among youth with disabilities, mental health-related (68%), learning (46%) and pain-related (34%) were the most common types of disability in 2022.

In 2022, 62% of working-age adults (25 to 64 years of age) with disabilities were employed, compared with 78% of persons without disabilities. The employment rate was lower among people with more severe disabilities. Nearly three-quarters (74%) of persons with milder disabilities aged 25 to 64 years were employed, while less than half (42%) of persons with more severe disabilities aged 25 to 64 years were employed.

In 2022,the median personal after-tax income of persons with disabilities was $32,870, compared with $39,490 for persons without disabilities. The median personal after-tax income for persons with more severe disabilities ($28,110) was lower than that for those with milder disabilities ($36,900).

== History ==
=== Institutionalization ===
Largely having to do with the widespread trust of medical authority and the growth of industrialization, Canadian society during the late 19th and early 20th centuries fostered the segregation of persons with disabilities. Public institutions, such as psychiatric hospitals, houses for the blind, houses of refuge, and church-run homes, confined and isolated persons with disabilities from the rest of society. Persons with disabilities were seen as being a burden on the rest of society and denied the full exercise of their rights.

=== Immigration laws ===
From the late 1800s, Canadian immigration laws banned people seen as “lunatics” or “idiots” from entering the country. These laws first targeted individuals lacking family support to avoid dependency on state aid. By the early 1900s, people with disabilities were deemed “inadmissible,” viewed as morally degenerate. This led to deportations until the 1967 Immigration Act amendment.

=== Compulsory sterilization ===
Canadian eugenics beliefs and practices operated via institutionalization and medical judgements, similar to other nations at the time, with thousands sterilized during the 1930s to 1970s, when people with disabilities were seen as "defective" and not fit to reproduce. While legislation in British Columbia required the consent of the person in question, their spouse, or a guardian, a 1937 amendment to the Sexual Sterilization Act of Alberta meant that, in certain circumstances, this procedure could be completed without the consent or even the knowledge of the person being sterilized. In Alberta, this legislation was repealed in 1972 under the Progressive Conservative government of Peter Lougheed. David King, the MLA who had tabled the bill for the repeal of the Act, stated that he saw the legislation as being in violation of human rights. In British Columbia, legislation permitting sterilization was repealed in 1973, and the E (Mrs) v Eve Supreme Court decision in 1986 affirmed that, in Canada, it is not legal to sterilize someone without their consent outside of emergency situations.

=== Deinstitutionalization ===
During the 1950s and 1960s, the process continued for the deinstitutionalization of persons with disabilities. Not-for-profit organizations such as the Canadian Association for Community Living (formed in 1958, then called the Canadian Association for Retarded Children) opened group homes for persons with disabilities and advocated that money saved by closing government institutions could be used for the expansion of community services.

== Policies ==
=== Legislation ===
At the federal level, Canada has the Accessible Canada Act exclusively dedicated to protecting the rights of Canadians with disabilities in areas of federal jurisdiction. Canadians with disabilities can additionally find prominent protection in the Charter of Rights and Freedoms which applies to all levels of jurisdiction in Canada, the Canadian Human Rights Act, and the Employment Equity Act. Discrimination against persons with disabilities is prohibited by the Canadian Human Rights Act, which was enacted in 1985. In addition, the Charter of Rights and Freedoms, enacted in 1982, guarantees that persons with disabilities are protected by and will receive the same benefits under the law as any other Canadian. Canada is thus the only country in the World explicitly protecting people with disabilities from discrimination in their constitution. The Employment Equity Act aims to ensure that particular groups, including persons with disabilities, enjoy the same employment opportunities and benefits as anyone else.

=== Programs and support ===
In 2022, 10% of people with disabilities lived below the poverty line, compared to 7% of those without disabilities. Canada's provincial disability programs do not provide sufficient income to recipients that fully depend on government support to enable them to afford typical food and housing costs of $341 per month and $1529/month for a studio apartment respectively. In Ontario and British Columbia, disability support program payments max out at $1308 and $1483.50 per month, respectively, for an individual.

The government has adopted a wide array of programs designed to make life more affordable for people with disabilities. These include the creation of Registered Disability Savings Plans in 2006, the Accessibility Fund in 2007 and Tax-free free Disability Savings Account in 2008. In light of the COVID-19 pandemic, the government enhanced these programs with increased funding, including reinstating the Canada Revenue Agency's Disability Advisory Committee.

Other financial programs for Canadians with disabilities currently offered by Employment and Social Development Canada include:

- Canada Pension Plan disability benefits,
- Canada Pension Plan children's benefits,
- Disability benefits for Veterans,
- the Child Disability Benefit,
- the Federal excise gasoline tax refund program,
- the Canada Disability Savings Grant,
- the Canada Disability Savings Bond,
- the Grant for services and equipment for students with permanent disabilities,
- the Canada student loans program - severe permanent disability benefit, and
- Grants for students with permanent disabilities

=== Environmental sensitivity ===
The Canadian Human Rights Commission maintains a policy on "environmental sensitivity" (a recognized disability) which gives affected employees the right to request that their employer ensures workplaces are free from egregious chemicals or smells.

=== Provincial policies ===
Most Canadian provinces and territories adopted disability support programs similar to the Ontario Disability Support Program. Ontario also adopted the Accessibility for Ontarians with Disabilities Act in 2005 but within that policy there is a clause called undue hardship which allows continued discrimination against persons with disabilities based on financial grounds.

== Disability organizations ==
After World War I, many veterans returned to Canada with physical and mental disabilities and had difficulty re-integrating into society. The needs of these veterans gave rise to disability advocacy organizations such as the War Amps, which fought for the need for services like rehabilitation, training in sheltered workshops, and other employment-related services. A disparity formed between the status of veterans with disabilities and that of civilians with disabilities, which would continue to widen until after World War II. In the mid-20th century, civilians with disabilities and their allies advocated for the rights of all persons with disabilities to participate fully in society. The deinstitutionalization of persons with disabilities was among their primary causes.

The end of the 1970s marked the establishment of the Coalition of Provincial Organizations of the Handicapped (now the Council for Canadians with Disabilities [CCD]), a prominent advocacy group. This organization stood out from others in that it was composed mainly of persons with disabilities themselves, rather than allies or professionals.

In 1981 the United Nations International Year for Disabled Persons drew attention to and triggered an increase in Canadians' awareness of disability issues. The following year the Charter of Rights and Freedoms was amended to include disability as a basis for discrimination, a cause strongly advocated by stakeholder groups such as the CCD. Canada's Human Rights Act came into effect in 1985, and the Employment Equity Act in 1986.

As a result of the economic recession, the early 1990s marked a difficult time for persons with disabilities: less funding was made available for social assistance and government subsidies were scarce and more difficult to obtain. Developments on disability issues continued to be made at a federal level. In 1991, under the Mulroney government, a five-year strategic action plan was announced for the Integration of Persons with Disabilities. In 1996 Prime Minister Jean Chrétien appointed a Federal Task Force on Disability Issues. The federal government Office for Disability Issues, the Government of Canada's focal point on matters with relation to disability, was founded in 2001. The 1990s marked the emergence of an academic discourse aimed at determining the place of disability in Canadian society....

Twenty-first century developments in disability issues include a 2012 Supreme Court decision which established that persons with mental-health disabilities can provide reliable court testimony, and Canada's ratification of the UN Convention on the Rights of Persons with Disabilities in March 2010. In signing the convention, Canada committed to attempting to improve the social and economic condition of Canadians with disabilities, and in 2014 it submitted a report to the UN detailing its progress.

Provincially and territorily there are multitude of groups including: Disability Alliance BC, Voice of Albertans with Disabilities (VAD), Barrier Free Saskatchewan, Manitoba League of Persons with Disabilities (MLPD), Citizens with Disabilities — Ontario, Confédération des Organismes de Personnes Handicapées du Québec (COPHAN), Environmental Health Association of Canada/ Environmental Health Association of Quebec, Nova Scotia League for Equal Opportunities (NSLEO), ResourceAbilities (PEI), Coalition of Persons with Disabilities--NFLD and Labrador (COD) Nunavummi Disabilities Makinnasuaqtiit Society, NWT Disabilities Council, Canadian Association of the Deaf (CAD), Canadian Council of the Blind (CCB), National Educational Association of Disabled Students (NEADS) and National Network for Mental Health (NNMH)

== Culture ==
A Disability Pride flag redesigned in 2021 by Ann Magill to be visually safe and inclusive.

The phrase disability culture originates from the disability rights and independent living movements of the 1960s and 1970s. Steven E. Brown defined disability culture in 1996, focusing on disability pride, ableism, and ties to other marginalized cultures. Key aspects include disabled self-determination and its role in identity. Disability culture varies by region and group, with differences in experiences, especially among racialized disabled individuals.

Symbols include the disability pride flag and the United Nations disability flag, and disability pride month is in July, while December 3 is the International Day of Persons with Disabilities. Disability studies programs exist in Canadian universities.

== See also ==
- Accessibility for Ontarians with Disabilities Act, 2005
- The Accessibility for Manitobans Act
- Human rights in Canada
