= Amaz =

Amaz or AMAZ may refer to:

- Amaz (gamer) (born 1991), Hong Kong-Canadian Hearthstone streamer on Twitch
- Agence et Messageries Aérienne du Zaïre, a defunct Zairean airline
- Amaz, a character in the 1967 British film Pretty Polly

== See also ==
- Amaze (disambiguation)
- Amazing (disambiguation)
