= Accessible Saskatchewan Act =

The Accessible Saskatchewan Act (2023, No. 19) is an act of the Legislative Assembly of Saskatchewan relating to accessibility.

== Provisions ==
The act recognises recognises American Sign Language and indigenous sign languages.

Public sector bodies are required to publish and implement accessibility plans. Municipalities with a population less than 10,000 are exempt. The legislation includes school divisions within the Education Act, 1995, and post-secondary education institutions under section 3 of the Post-secondary Education and Skills Training Regulations, 2022.

== Implementation ==
The provincial government established its Accessibility Advisory Committee to support the implementation of the act. The requirement for public sector bodies to publish accessibility plans came into force in December 2024.

== See also ==
- Accessible Canada Act for the corresponding Federal Canadian legislation.
- Ontarians with Disabilities Act for the corresponding Ontario provincial legislation.
- Accessibility Act (Nova Scotia) for the corresponding Nova Scotia provincial legislation.
- Accessibility for Manitobans Act for the corresponding Manitoba provincial legislation.
- Accessible British Columbia Act for the corresponding British Columbia provincial legislation.
- Disability Discrimination Act 1995 for the corresponding UK legislation.
- Americans with Disabilities Act of 1990 for the corresponding American federal legislation.
