= EIAO =

EIAO or E.I.A.O. may refer to:

- European Internet Accessibility Observatory, an organization assessing Internet accessibility
- European Interparliamentary Assembly on Orthodoxy, a transnational organization of orthodox parliamentarians

See also

- Eiao, a formerly populated island in French Polynesia
