= BS 8878 =

British internet accessibility code

British Standard 8878 (BS 8878) is a Web Accessibility Code of Practice which was published by the BSI Group (also known as the British Standards Institution or BSI). The standard was officially launched on 7 December 2010.

BS 8878 defines a process for creating and embedding a web accessibility strategy within an organisation. It is written in non technical language and is aimed at people within an organisation who have responsibilities for web strategy or development. The standard consists largely of 16 steps in roughly three categories.

The term "web product" is introduced in BS 8878 to describe any web-based service. It encompasses web sites, web applications, software as a service, cloud based services and other services accessed via a web browser.

BS 8878 is not intended as a competitor or alternative to the WCAG guidelines developed by W3C WAI. Rather, it defines the processes needed in the planning and deployment of accessible web products. This can include the selection of WCAG guidelines. BS 8878 is part of the UK government's broader self-regulatory approach to standardization.

On 28 May 2019, BS 8878 was superseded by ISO 30071-1, the international standard that built on BS 8878 and expanded it for international use. More information can be found via the official website for the standard ISO 30071-1 .

== Further Information ==
- BS 8878 web accessibility standards (supersedes PAS 78) – all you need to know, Jonathan Hassell, Hassell Inclusion, http://www.hassellinclusion.com/bs8878/
- BS8878 Web Accessibility Code of Practice, Léonie Watson, Nomensa blog, 10 December 2010, http://www.nomensa.com/blog/2010/bs8878-web-accessibility-code-of-practice/
