= WebAIM =

Non-profit organization based in Utah, US

WebAIM (Web Accessibility in Mind)
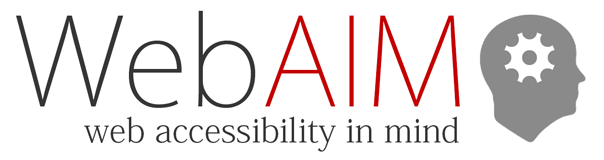
- Type: Non-profit
- Founded: 1999
- Headquarters: Logan, Utah
- Key people: Cyndi Rowland, Jared Smith, Jonathan Whiting, George Joeckel, John Northup
- Number of employees: 9
- Website: webaim.org

WebAIM (Web Accessibility in Mind) is a non-profit organization based at Utah State University in Logan, Utah. It has provided web accessibility solutions since 1999. Its mission is to expand the potential of the web for people with disabilities by providing the knowledge, technical skills, tools, organizational leadership strategies, and vision that empower organizations to make their own content accessible to people with disabilities.

== Products and services ==
WebAIM provides a number of web accessibility products and services. The WAVE accessibility evaluation tool is administered by WebAIM. This free, online tool provides visual feedback of a page's accessibility. The WAVE Toolbar is also available as an extension for both Firefox & Chrome browsers.

WebAIM web accessibility services include accessibility training, web site monitoring & reporting, certification, consulting, accessible site design, and accessibility repairs.

== Community ==
WebAIM administers an online community that focuses on web accessibility. Community resources include a newsletter, blog, email discussion list, an onsite 2-day training, and RSS feeds.

== Resources ==
The WebAIM web site provides extensive information for web developers, webmasters, and others interested in accessibility of web content for the following disabilities:

- visual disabilities - blindness, low vision, and color blindness
- motor disabilities - including Parkinson's disease, paraplegia, muscular dystrophy, cerebral palsy, arthritis, stroke, etc.
- cognitive disabilities - including dementia, dyslexia, autism, Down syndrome, traumatic brain injury, attention deficit disorder, or other functional disabilities that may impact ones ability in memory, problem-solving, attention, and reading, math, or visual comprehension.
- deafness and hearing impairments.

== See also ==
- Digital accessibility technologist

WebAIM Articles address a range of web accessibility topics, including:

- Introduction to Web Accessibility
- How individuals with disabilities access and use the web
- Assistive technology
- Adobe Flash
- HTML
  - Forms
  - Frames
  - JavaScript
  - AJAX
  - Cascading Style Sheets
  - Tables
- Rich Media
  - Adobe Acrobat
  - Closed captioning
  - Adobe Flash
  - Microsoft Word and PowerPoint
- Evaluation, Testing, and Tools
- Standards and Laws
  - W3C's Web Content Accessibility Guidelines
  - Section 508
  - International laws
- Policy, Coordination, and Training
