= European Union disability policy =

The European Union policy for disabled people guarantees governmental responsibility for all disabled people in all of the EU's 27 member states. This policy operates in the framework of the subsidiarity principle: if possible, one should improve at the national level, though in principle the EU will refrain from setting strictly binding laws in this area. Through the combined activities of the Council of Europe and the United Nations, the EU disability policy has been in effect in many EU member states for years.

== Background ==
During the First World War, the disability protection system in Europe covered only war veterans and soldiers, based on the concept that people are owed this protection when they have sacrificed for their country. This principle is also referred to in terms of a quid pro quo duty, as soldiers should receive something in exchange for their service.

After the Second World War, attitudes changed towards disability, in part because of the millions of people injured in its aftermath. Furthermore, there also existed a high level of unemployment among disabled people throughout Europe in the postwar period. Therefore, post 1945, European states responded to this situation by initially forcing employers to recruit disabled veterans and this policy was later extended to cover disabled civilians.

== European legislation for disabled people ==
From the beginning of the European Community (EC), the process of lawmaking within the union was subject to the conventions and declarations of the United Nations. Eventually, the EC made its own laws regarding disabled people before transitioning into the European Union (EU) in the early 1990s. Below is a timeline of legislation regarding disabled people established by the EU, or through its predecessor bodies, split into two periods, from 1945 to 1992 and from 1992 to the present. The first period guaranteed broad rights to persons with disabilities and non-disabled people alike. From the early 1990s onwards, various treaties and policies came into force which specifically focused on enhancing the rights of disabled people.

=== 1945-1992 ===
- European Convention on Human Rights, 1953: disabled people are not explicitly mentioned in the articles. This Convention safeguards human rights of individuals, and thereby implicitly includes those who are disabled. However, over the subsequent years since the convention was established in 1959, requests and applications contributed by disabled people into the Court of Human Rights, and to the European Commission changed the approach to disability under the convention;
- European Community Treaty of Rome, 1957: the Council reserves the right to fight discrimination, inter alia, against disability, age, or sex. Treaty articles indicate that people are equal, and have the same rights, but also deserve equal pay for equal work;
- Resolution of the Council of the European Communities (Council of Ministers) of 27 June 1974: laying down the first Community Action Program for occupational rehabilitation of persons with disabilities;
- Resolution of the Council of the European Communities of 27 June 1974: laying down the Joint Program of Activities of the Communities, concentrating on the vocational and social reintegration of people with disabilities;
- Resolution of the Council of the European Communities of 21 December 1981: focuses on social inclusion of persons with disabilities at the community level;
- Recommendation on the Employment of People with Disabilities in the Community 24 July 1986: this recommendation was adopted by the Council of the European Communities. The recommendation was dedicated to the professional careers of disabled persons, with a concentration on the creation of new workplaces. Another focus was that of sheltered employment. It was recommended that each country should review the situation in the field of sheltered employment and protected activities, as well as prepare improvements going forward. It was also decided to grant high priority to improving the possibilities of training disabled persons and preparing them for an active professional life. The Council directed incentives to the employers for the financing of special costs resulting from employing disabled workers;
- European Social Charter: grants the right to solicit benefits from welfare services, and gives both medical and social assistance to those who need it. Furthermore, mentally or physically disabled people gain the right to regulated social resettlements, professional training, and rehabilitation. The charter defines that those people should be properly placed in the labor market and also that some steps should be taken to encourage employees to employ disabled people;

=== 1992-present ===
The Maastricht Treaty formally established the European Union in 1992 as the successor of the European Community.

- Treaty of Amsterdam, 1997, was the first treaty in which EU directly addressed disability issues. It imposed an obligation to counteract discrimination against persons with disabilities. After the signing of the Treaty of Amsterdam, the scope of the initiatives taken by the Union towards conducting a coherent policy for people with disabilities significantly increased;
- Charter of Fundamental Rights of the European Union, 7 December 2000, was adopted and was later included in the Lisbon Treaty. This charter clarifies that all people are equal, and among other things prohibits discrimination based on disability and recognizes and respects the rights of persons with disabilities to use the means designed to ensure their independence, social and professional integration, and participation in social life;
- The Treaty of Lisbon created a European Union that functioned as a fully-fledged international organization with a legal personality, and it also gave the Member States tools and mechanisms for working together on policies such as those for disabled people. However, the cooperation and institutional frameworks that were effective for functioning the whole of the EU on many different policy areas were not so effective for the 27 member states. This led to issues of fulfilling the obligations of the EU legislation at the same level in each state. The treaty includes a number of provisions regarding the situation of persons with disabilities, such as a clause for non-discrimination in the field of disablement at every level. There began an open method of coordination between States in the fields of employment, protection of health, education, training and social protection;
- The Equality Act 2010 was a legal way to protect persons with disabilities from discrimination occurrences in workplaces and generally in society. It prohibited discrimination addressed to the disabled people in different fields: including delivery of goods, associations, facilities, services, work, in the discharge of public functions, premises, and education. In the Act, disability is one protected characteristic among others, only those with diagnosed disabilities can rely upon these provisions;
- European Disability Strategy 2010-2020 - the continuation of a previous Strategy for period 2004–2010, that distinguishes 8 priority fields of actions:
  - Accessibility – customization of services and goods to disabled people;
  - Participation – making sure that disabled people are using all benefits and rights which belong to them from EU citizenship, that are guaranteed in legal documents, treaties and others;
  - Equality – commencement of equal opportunities and the fight against discrimination,
  - Employment – increasing the share of disabled people who work in the labor market;
  - Education, training – education-promoting actions and lifelong learning for young disabled people, ensuring equal access to education, which leads to full participation in society and the overall increased quality of life;
  - Social protection – fight against poverty, exclusion, and promotion of dignified living conditions;
  - Health care - equal access to medical services;
  - External actions – promoting the rights of disabled people among EU enlargements states and establishing international programs about disability;
- The adoption of the European accessibility act in 2019 is beginning the next phase of accessibility momentum.

== European Year of People with Disabilities ==
The EU established the year 2003 as the European Year of People with Disabilities. Following the success of this event, the European Commission introduced the Equal opportunities for people with disabilities: a European action plan for the years 2004-2010. It aimed to develop a sustainable-operational approach to the case for disabled people in the extended Europe, finding out and protecting the rights of disabled people.
