= Web Accessibility Directive =

European Union directive

Directive 2016/2102
- European Union directive
- Text with EEA relevance
- Title: Directive on the accessibility of the websites and mobile applications of public sector bodies
- Made by: European Parliament and Council
- Journal reference: L 327 p. 1–15

History
- Date made: 26 October 2016
- Entry into force: 15 Nov 2016
- Applies from: 23 September 2018 (for specific categories of content, see the directive timeline)

The Directive on the accessibility of websites and mobile applications also known as Directive (EU) 2016/2102 was adopted by the European Union (EU) in 2016. This Directive applies to public sector organizations of member states of the European Union. The goal was to ensure that all public sector organizations were accessible for the 80 million people with disabilities in the EU.

This EU Directive gave each member state until 2018 to be transposed into national legislation. Each member country is responsible for implementing national legislation that conforms. A minimum level of harmonization is required which Member States must maintain. National legislation can exceed these minimum requirements, and some countries have chosen to do so. In transposing this EU Directive to national legislation, there was no need to extend it beyond the public sector organizations, but France chose to go beyond the minimum.

The Web Accessibility Directive Expert Group (WADEX) was established to provide support on the implementation of the Directive.

The EU also implemented four Commission Implementing Decisions to complete the directive. These implementing decisions are legally binding acts within the European Union and are directly applicable in all member states of the EU. "Implementing decisions are always limited in scope. Their aim is to ensure uniform implementation of European legislation, and the subject-matter of any implementing decision serves that goal alone." The related implementing decisions provide a model accessibility statement (2018/1523), monitoring methodology and arrangements for reporting (2018/1524), harmonised standard for websites and mobile application (2018/2048, updated by 2021/1339).

The EU's new European Accessibility Act complements the Web Accessibility Directive and applies to the private sector, thus impacting a much larger number of people.

== Implications of this Directive ==
The Directive:

- addresses websites and apps of public sector organizations;
- refers to specific standards, such as EN 301 549;
- requires the publication of an accessibility statement for websites and mobile apps;
- calls for a feedback mechanism for users to flag accessibility problems;
- expects regular accessibility monitoring and corresponding public reports by Member States.

There is no specific reference to the Authoring Tool Accessibility Guidelines (ATAG) 2.0, but Note 2: clause 48 talks both promoting authoring tools that help with accessibility and the recommendation to fund their development.

The EC is also supporting the financing of research and pilot projects such as

- World Wide Web Consortium (W3C)'s Web Accessibility Initiative (WAI) - WAI-Tools to establish uniform accessibility testing rules;
- W3C-WAI - WAI-Guide to design educational material;
- WADcher to develop a WAD platform prototype for evaluation, monitoring and reporting for WAD;
- Funka Nu AB - We4Authors to facilitates the incorporation of accessibility features as the default option in authoring tools.

=== Timeline for Implementation ===
- 23 September 2018 - Member States must transpose this Directive to national legislation
- 23 September 2019 - all new public sector websites must conform
- 23 September 2020 - all public sector websites must conform
- 23 June 2021 - all mobile apps must conform
- 23 December 2021 - member states' websites will need to be monitored and publicly reported
- 23 June 2022 - European Commission to carry out a review of the application of this directive (Article 13).

=== Accessibility Monitoring and Reporting ===
Member States' have assigned organizations which are in charge of monitoring the implementation of the Web Accessibility Directive. Among other tasks, these organizations are responsible for regular monitoring of public sector sites, review disproportionate burden cases and accessibility statements, and guarantee both accessibility compliance and effective handling of feed-back given by users. The European Commission's 2022 eGovernment Benchmark compares how governments across Europe deliver digital public services.

==== 2020-2021 Reports ====
A full public list of EU monitoring reports produced because of the Web Accessibility Directive is available per country. This included the UK: Accessibility report of public sector websites and mobile apps due to the Agreement on the withdrawal of the United Kingdom from the European Union. All member states aside from France and Cyprus have published their monitoring reports. Luxembourg's Digital accessibility monitoring in Luxembourg, Ireland's Monitoring Report EU WAD Ireland 2021 and Malta's Report on the outcome of the monitoring and use of the enforcement procedure were written in English. Both Slovenia and Portugal also included an English translation. All other reports were translated to English using fully automated machine translation.

Every three years, member states are required to provide reporting. The next reports will be due in December 2024.

== See also ==
- European Accessibility Act for the private and non-profit sectors.
- Accessible Canada Act for the corresponding Federal Canadian legislation.
- Disability Discrimination Act for the corresponding UK legislation.
- Americans with Disabilities Act of 1990 for the corresponding American federal legislation.
