= Amaze =

Amaze may refer to:

- A Maze, annual video game festival in Berlin
- Amaze (software), a digital accessibility technology
- Amaze Entertainment, a video game development company
- Honda Amaze, a car by Honda

== See also ==
- Amazing
