= Minister responsible for Persons with Disabilities (Manitoba) =

The minister responsible for Accessibility (formerly minister responsible for persons with disabilities) is the member of the Executive Council of Manitoba tasked with overseeing issues related to accessibility and disability in the province of Manitoba.

The executive council of Manitoba has included a minister responsible for accessibility-related issues since 2001. This position is not a full cabinet portfolio, and the responsibility has always been taken by a minister with other cabinet duties. So far, every minister to hold the position has also been Minister of Family Services and Housing.

== List of ministers ==
Name	Party	Took office	Left office
Minister responsible for persons with disabilities
Tim Sale	New Democratic	January 17, 2001	September 25, 2002
Drew Caldwell	New Democratic	September 25, 2002	November 4, 2003
Christine Melnick	New Democratic	November 4, 2003	September 21, 2006
Gord Mackintosh	New Democratic	September 21, 2006	November 3, 2009
Minister responsible for Accessibility
Rochelle Squires	Progressive Conservative	January 5, 2021	October 18, 2023
Nahanni Fontaine	New Democratic	October 18, 2023	incumbent

== See also ==
- Disability in Canada
- Government of Manitoba
