= Web interoperability =

Web interoperability is producing web pages viewable with nearly every device and web browser. There have been various projects to improve web interoperability, for example the Web Standards Project, Mozilla's Technology Evangelism and Web Standards Group, and the Web Essential Conference.

== History ==
The term was first used in the Web Interoperability Pledge, which is a promise to adhere to current HTML recommendations as promoted by the World Wide Web Consortium (W3C). The WIP was not a W3C initiative but it was started by and has been run by ZDNet AnchorDesk.

This issue was known as "cross browsing" in the browser war between Internet Explorer and Netscape. Microsoft's Internet Explorer was the dominant browser after that, but modern web browsers such as Mozilla Firefox, Opera and Safari have become dominant, and support additional web standards beyond what Internet Explorer supports. Because of Internet Explorer's backwards compatibility, some web pages have continued to use non-standard HTML tags, DOM handling scripts, and platform-specific technologies such as ActiveX, which could potentially be harmful for Web accessibility and device independence.

== Elements ==
- Structural and semantic markup with HTML
- CSS-based layout with layout elements that resize based on screen size

== See also ==
- Computer accessibility
- Multimodal interaction
- Forward compatibility
