= Lisa Seeman =

American entrepreneur

Lisa Seeman is an inventor and an entrepreneur and has been instrumental in creating standards for interoperability and accessibility.

She currently works for Athena ICT.

== UB Access ==
Seeman headed a government funded incubator project that culminated into an independent company (UB Access). In 2006, UB Access was sold to Aequus Technologies Corp. and she became chief technology officer for Aequus DPS and served as managing director of UB Access' operations in Israel, that was involved in content adaptation for elearning, accessibility and localization. She then moved to EFP Consulting, creating research and development proposals and international consortiums within the FP7 framework of the European Commission. Topics included: Methodology to determine issues of complexity that effect the adoption of technology; new programming paradigms and abstractions; methodology for predicting the effect of technology on society.

== Web standards ==
Seeman is currently the facilitator of the Cognitive and Learning Disabilities Accessibility Task Force (Cognitive A11Y TF) of the web accessibility initiative of the W3C. It aims to improve the user experience for people with learning and cognitive disabilities.

Seeman has been an invited expert for the W3C since 1999. In 2006 she became the original author and editor of the Roles for Accessible Rich Internet Applications specification and the States and Properties Module for Accessible Rich Internet Applications which then became the specifications for Accessible Rich Internet Applications (WAI-ARIA) for the W3C. She is a named contributor to the Web Content Accessibility Guidelines (WCAG 2.0) specification, although she also headed a controversial formal objection to WCAG's claim that WCAG 2.0 will address requirements for people with learning disabilities and cognitive limitations.

Seeman was also involved with ISOC IL, ACLIP, and has worked with accessibility groups of organizations such as Dublin Core and ISO.

== Talks and publications ==
She published on topics such as dyslexia and society, the semantic web, web accessibility, and device independence. She frequently gives presentations at conferences and venues such as W3C events, standards organizations, colleges, universities and NGOs.
