= EN 301 549 =

EU digital accessibility standard

- Accessibility requirements suitable for public procurement of ICT products and services in Europe
- Status: Published
- Year started: February 2013
- First published: February 2014
- Latest version: 4.1.1; September 2026; 1 month ago
- Organization: CEN, CENELEC, ETSI
- Committee: Technical Committee Human Factors & eAccessibility Joint Working Group
- Base standards: WCAG
- Domain: Computer accessibility, Web accessibility
- Copyright: © ETSI 2026. © Comité Européen de Normalisation 2026. © Comité Européen de Normalisation Electrotechnique 2026.

EN 301 549 is a European standard that specifies accessibility requirements for information and communications technology (ICT) products and services. The standard sets guidelines for digital accessibility, including for people with disabilities. The latest version of the standard, EN 301 549 V4.1.1, includes the text of WCAG 2.2 in full.

== History of EN 301 549 ==
This standard was produced by CEN, CENELEC and ETSI to set requirements for products and services in the European Union. EN 301 549 is the harmonized European Standard for ICT Accessibility. It is used in public procurement, as it is important that government services are easy for everyone to use. With the European Accessibility Act, it is applicable to most organizations in Europe. Since its publication, the guidelines have been updated to keep up with best practices.

=== Versions over time ===
- 301 549:2026 V4.1.1 (Date: 2026-09)
- CAN/ASC - EN 301 549:2024 (Date: 2024-05)
- EN 301 549:2021 V3.2.1 (Date: 2021-03)
- EN 301 549:2019 V3.1.1 (Date: 2019-11)
- EN 301 549:2018 V2.1.2 (Date: 2018-08)
- EN 301 549:2015 V1.1.2 (Date: 2015-04)

== Why digital standards matter ==
EN 301 549 has generally adopted the latest recommended version of Web Content Accessibility Guidelines from the W3C's Web Accessibility Initiative, after a period of review. In version 2.1.2 the Harmonized Accessibility Standards officially adopted the W3C's WCAG 2.1 guidelines. Previous versions of EN 301 549 embraced WCAG 2.0 as an ‘electronic attachment’. The next version of EN 301 549 (v4.1.1) will be released in 2026. This new version is planned to support the European Accessibility Act and to include WCAG 2.2 AA, as well as significant updates to requirements related to Real-Time Text.

The EU approved the Web Accessibility Directive before the EN 301 549 standard had been developed. The implemented decision provides for the presumption of conformity between member states. Having a global guideline like WCAG is great, but it is easier to implement for some countries as a clear standard. Member states had until September 2018 to draft the laws and regulations which enforce the relevant accessibility requirements. Members states are free to determine how they implement the EN 301 549 standard and may exceed them. However, they now constitute a minimum standard for accessibility for European governments.

=== What is included ===
The standard includes web and mobile applications but also addresses a wide range of other technologies beside those covered by WCAG:

- Information and communications technology (ICT) products;
- Services related to products;
- Web sites; and
- Some specific telecommunications services necessary to provide alternative modes of communication for speech modality (such as text or images) and their routing could offer access to services such as emergency calls or relay services for everyone.

== Global Adoption ==
The standard has been adopted in countries outside of the European Union, for example in Australia and Canada. This helps them make their technology easier for everyone to use and keeps their standards in line, which facilitates trade with Europe. Even where it hasn't been yet adopted, it is being used as a bench-mark for evaluating digital accessibility.

In Australia, EN 301 549 is identically adopted as the voluntary standard AS EN 301 549. The standard is not legislated at the federal level, but several state governments, including New South Wales, Victoria, and Queensland, use the standard for ICT procurement.

In 2024, Canada adopted the current (2021) version of the European Union's EN 301 549, as CAN/ASC - EN 301 549:2024. It is now a National Standard of Canada. Their version is identical to the original, but is available not only in PDF format but also in MS Word and HTML formats. The Canadian version is also available in French.

== Future updates ==
The standard is updated regularly to keep up with new technology. Updates have tended to be every 3-5 years.

== User preferences ==
Version 3.2.1 clause 11.7 required applicable software interfaces to follow platform preferences for units of measurement, colour, contrast, font, font size and focus cursor (user preferences). Interpretations of this by member states were varied with Sweden’s Agency for Digital Government interpreted the colour requirement as including support for an dark-mode preference, while the German BIK testing methodology tested browser-defined fonts, text sizes, foreground colours and background colours.

Version 4.1.1 introduced separate requirements for web pages, non-web documents and non-web software. Clause 9.7 requires web pages not to block user-agent modes that present pages according to user preferences or explicitly override documented platform accessibility features unless doing so is essential to the information or function. Examples include colour filters, contrast, text size, pointer size and the text cursor. This does not expressly require support for dark mode, but focusing on the requirements of a platform's documented features.

== See also ==
- Section 508 Amendment to the Rehabilitation Act of 1973
- Web Accessibility Directive
- European Accessibility Act
