= European Internet Accessibility Observatory =

The European Internet Accessibility Observatory (EIAO) was founded in September 2004. Their main purpose is assessing the accessibility of European web sites and participating in a cluster developing a European Accessibility Methodology.

The assessments are based on UWEM which again is based on WCAG developed by W3C.
