= Council for Canadians with Disabilities =

Canadian disability rights organization

Council for Canadians with Disabilities (CCD), formerly known as the Coalition of Provincial Organizations of the Handicapped (COPOH), was created by people with disabilities in 1976 to provide support for all people with disabilities who seek the opportunity to go to school, work, volunteer, have a family, and participate in recreational, sport and cultural activities. The CCD is a national human rights organization of people with disabilities working for an accessible and inclusive Canada. In the 1970s, the CCD became a permanent part of the disability rights movement and it became a fluid entity that includes people with a range of different disabilities. To manage the work that will lead to the achievement of this goal, CCD established the following Committees to guide their activities in key areas:

1. Human Rights Committee: Identifies Human Rights Committee issues of concern to persons with disabilities that could be addressed through law reform initiatives.
2. Social Policy Committee: Identifies Social Policy Committee issues of national concern to persons with disabilities.
3. Transportation Committee
4. International Development Committee: Provides advice to CCD National Council on reforms that would improve the effect of Canada's foreign aid and policy on persons with disabilities.
5. Access to Technology Committee.

== Laws and Standards ==
Since the spring of 2009, the CCD Human Rights Committee has been involved in legal cases involving the interpretation of equality for people with disabilities . The committee seeks to achieve a fair and equal legal system by promoting the adoption of disability-related policy. The CCD has been a clear voice for the dignity and equality of people with disabilities. The CCD has played a key role by bringing disability issues before Parliament and the Supreme Court of Canada.

CCD National Action Plan The CCD National Action Plan; which was review by provincial and federal governments, highlights the importance of employment, adequate income and disability-related support. The Action Plan covers four areas: disability-related supports and deinstitutionalisation, poverty, unemployment and exclusion. The CCD's Nation Action Plan seeks to maximize opportunities for Canadians with disabilities by highlighting the importance of deinstitutionalization and, disability-related support. The disability-related support team is formed by technical aids, sign interpreters, support network and job coaches. Disability support is exclusively for the individual with disability and it contains pertinent information that encourages inclusion and awareness. One of the most important advances for Disability-Related Policy in Canada was the constitutional recognition of the rights of people with disabilities in the Canadian Charter of Rights and Freedoms. Section 15 guarantees equal benefit and protection of the law to people. The charter states that every individual is equal before and under the law and has the right to the equal protection and equal benefit of the law without discrimination and, in particular, without discrimination based on race, national or ethnic origin, colour, religion, sex, age, or mental or physical disability.

Educational authorities in Canada affirmed that education is essential to enable a person with disability to function in society and that all people, regardless of their handicap, should benefit from it. The United Nations Convention on the Rights of Persons with Disabilities. Article 24 of the Convention requires States Parties "to recognize the right of persons with disabilities to education. With a view to realizing this right without discrimination and on the basis of equal opportunity, States Parties shall ensure an inclusive education system at all levels. The mission of the National Action Plan is to make people realize that society should meet every educational need of a handicapped people.

Social Justice To most disability rights movement "disability" is not an inherent trait of the "disable" person. Rather it is a condition that results from the interaction between physical or mental characteristic labeled "impairment". The World Health Organization issued a widely definition that distinguishes among impairment ("any loss of psychological, physiological, or anatomical function"), disability ("any restriction of ability to perform an activity within the range considered normal for a human being"), and handicap ("a disadvantage for a given individual, resulting from an impairment that limits the fulfillment of a role that is normal for that individual.) The social model of disability sees disability as a socially created problem and not at all an attribute of an individual. On the social model, disability demands a political response, since the problem is created by an unaccommodating physical environment brought about by attitudes and other features of the social environment.

Social movements for people with disabilities seek to remake society to eliminate "disability" as a disadvantaged group status. The social right activists seek this result through the means of civil rights. The goal of the Council for Canadians with Disabilities is to have an effective action plan in order to change a social system where handicap people are discriminated. The CCD social justice movement also addresses the high rates of poverty facing Canadians with disabilities and its causes and the lack of access to disability supports that perpetuate barriers and exclusion and keep people with disabilities and their families invisible and marginalized. CCD Social Justice Movement believes in:

- Citizenship—People with disabilities have the same rights and responsibilities as Canadians without disabilities. Socially made barriers, which prevent participation and discriminate against people with disabilities, must be eliminated.
- Consumer Control—People with disabilities must be involved in all stages of the development of disability services and policies and in all decision-making that affects their lives.
- Equality and Human Rights—the Charter of Rights and Freedoms guarantees equal benefit and protection under the law and the Canadian Human Rights Act prohibits discrimination based upon physical or mental disability. All legislation must conform to the demands of the Charter.
- Universal Design—the environment should be designed to be usable by people with various disabilities.

== CCD Current activities ==
CCD's current activities seek to provide people with disability with the opportunity to develop self-awareness and appropriate social skills. In 2011, the CCD created a social participation and activity called "On the Home Front" which highlights the legal efforts to rescue disable people from second-class citizenship. It also provides information about people with disabilities who live on low incomes. The CCD is leading a unique research alliance, focusing on poverty and people with disabilities. “On the Home front” is a strategic initiative that leads a team of disability community and academic researchers dedicated to front bringing forward recommendations and plans for alleviating the disproportionate poverty of Canadians with disabilities, such as poverty, disability, living arrangements and residential needs. The CCD's disability-related support team provides solutions for social exclusion and unemployment. The World Health Assembly has unanimously adopted a resolution that could substantially improve the lives of people with disabilities. The Resolution adopted by the World Health Assembly draws attention to people living with physical, sensory and mental disabilities of various types, their health and rehabilitation needs, and the cost of their exclusion from society. CCD's activists affirmed that the very term "disability" is often used to describe a condition that prevents an individual from working. People with disabilities living in low-income households are more likely than their counterparts with higher incomes to indicate that they receive only some of the help they need (27.1% vs. 21.3%) or none of the help needed (10.2% vs. 4.7%, respectively.) Therefore, the identity created for people with disabilities is widely perceived as incompatible with the assumption that they should work. The CCD "on the Home Front" project seeks to prove that attaining employment is a crucial step for people with disability because they will achieve recognition as independent and active participant in society.

Organization structure Overall management and administration of the organization takes place in Winnipeg, Manitoba. Council for Canadian with Disabilities refers to its board of directors as the National Council of Representatives which consists in seven Directors and officers or members. CCD's members are provincial/territorial cross-disability, consumer-controlled, human rights organizations and national uni- and cross-disability, consumer-controlled, human rights organizations. Every year the National Council of Representatives elects the CCD Executive Committee which has four Honorary Members and an executive board which establishes policies, approves programs and oversees administrative and financial plans.
