= Amazing =

Amazing may refer to:

== Music ==
=== Performers ===
- The Amazing, a Swedish indie rock band

=== Albums ===
- Amazing (Banaroo album), 2006
- Amazing (Elkie Brooks album), 1996
- Amazing (Marcia Hines album) or the title song, 2014
- Amazin' (Trina album) or the title song, 2010
- Amazing: The Best of Alex Lloyd or the title song (see below), 2006

=== Songs ===
- "Amazing" (Aerosmith song), 1993
- "Amazing" (Alex Lloyd song), 2001
- "Amazing" (Danny Saucedo song), 2012
- "Amazing" (Foxes song), 2016
- "Amazing" (Francesca Michielin song), 2014
- "Amazing" (George Michael song), 2004
- "Amazing" (High and Mighty Color song), 2007
- "Amazing" (Inna song), 2009
- "Amazing" (Josh Kelley song), 2003
- "Amazing" (Kanye West song), 2009
- "Amazin'" (LL Cool J song), 2003
- "Amazing" (Matt Cardle song), 2012
- "Amazing" (Seal song), 2007
- "Amazing" (Tanja song), representing Estonia at Eurovision 2014
- "Amazing" (Vanessa Amorosi song), 2011
- "Amazing" (Westlife song), 2006
- "Amazing", by Andy Hunter° from Exodus
- "Amazing", by Big Time Rush from 24/Seven
- "Amazing", by Chris Norman from Break Away, 2004
- "Amazing", by David Banner from Sex, Drugs & Video Games
- "Amazing", by Judith Durham and the Seekers from Future Road
- "Amazing", by Future and Metro Boomin from We Still Don't Trust You, 2024
- "Amazing", by Madonna from Music
- "Amazing", by Mystery Skulls from Mystery Skulls
- "Amazing", by Nav from Bad Habits
- "Amazing", by T.I. from No Mercy
- "Amazing", by Tin Machine from Tin Machine

== Other uses ==
- Amazing (film), a 2013 Chinese film
- Amazing (gamer), Maurice Stückenschneider, German professional League of Legends player
- A*mazing, a 1990s Australian children's television game show
- Amazing, a 1984 Macintosh game

== See also ==
- Amaze
- "Amazing Grace", a 1972 gospel song
- Amazing Labyrinth, a boardgame
- Amazing Stories (a.k.a. Amazing Science Fiction, ), a science fiction magazine published from 1926 to 2006
  - Amazing Stories (1985 TV series), a television anthology series from 1985 to 1987
