= Web Content Accessibility Guidelines =

Web accessibility guidelines

WCAG
- Web Content Accessibility Guidelines
- World Wide Web Consortium (W3C) logo
- Abbreviation: WCAG
- Status: W3C Recommendation
- Year started: January 1995
- First published: 9 May 1999
- Latest version: 2.2; October 5, 2023; 3 years ago
- Preview version: 3.0; July 24, 2023; 3 years ago
- Organization: W3C, ISO, IEC
- Committee: Accessibility Guidelines Working Group
- Editors: Andrew Kirkpatrick; Joshue O Connor; Alastair Campbell; Ben Caldwell; Michael Cooper; Loretta Guarino Reid; Gregg Vanderheiden; Wendy Chisholm; John Slatin; Jason White; Rachael Bradley Montgomery; Jeanne Spellman; Shawn Lauriat
- Domain: Web accessibility
- Copyright: © 2020–2023 W3C® (MIT, ERCIM, Keio, Beihang).
- Website: W3C: www.w3.org/TR/WCAG22/; ISO / IEC: www.iso.org/standard/58625.html

The Web Content Accessibility Guidelines (WCAG) are part of a series published by the Web Accessibility Initiative (WAI) of the World Wide Web Consortium (W3C), the main international standards organization for the Internet. They are a set of recommendations for improving web accessibility, primarily for people with disabilities—but also for all user agents, including highly limited devices, such as mobile phones. WCAG 2.0 was published in December 2008 and became an ISO standard, ISO/IEC 40500:2012 in October 2012. WCAG 2.2 became a W3C Recommendation on 5 October 2023.

== History ==
=== Earlier guidelines (1995–1998) ===
The first web accessibility guideline was compiled by Gregg Vanderheiden and released in January 1995, just after the 1994 Second International Conference on the World-Wide Web (WWW II) in Chicago (where Tim Berners-Lee first mentioned disability access in a keynote speech after seeing a pre-conference workshop on accessibility led by Mike Paciello).

Over 38 different Web access guidelines followed from various authors and organizations over the next few years. These were brought together in the Unified Web Site Accessibility Guidelines compiled at the University of Wisconsin–Madison. Version 8 of the Unified Web Site Accessibility Guidelines, published in 1998, served as the starting point for the W3C's WCAG 1.0.

=== Version 1 (1999–2000) ===
The WCAG 1.0 were published and became a W3C recommendation on 5 May 1999. In February 2008, The WCAG Samurai, a group of developers independent of the W3C, and led by Joe Clark, published corrections for, and extensions to, the WCAG 1.0.

=== Version 2 (2001–present) ===
The first concept proposal of WCAG 2.0 was published on 25 January 2001. In the following years new versions were published intended to solicit feedback from accessibility experts and members of the disability community. On 27 April 2006 a "Last Call Working Draft" was published. Due to the many amendments that were necessary, WCAG 2.0 was published again as a concept proposal on 17 May 2007, followed by a second "Last Call Working Draft" on 11 December 2007. In April 2008 the guidelines became a "Candidate Recommendation". On 3 November 2008 the guidelines became a "Proposed Recommendation". WCAG 2.0 was published as a W3C Recommendation on 11 December 2008. In October 2012, WCAG 2.0 were accepted by the International Organization for Standardization as an ISO International Standard, ISO/IEC 40500:2012. In early 2014, WCAG 2.0's Level A and Level AA success criteria were incorporated as references in clause 9.2 ("Web content requirements") of the European standard EN 301 549 published by ETSI. EN 301 549 was produced in response to a mandate that the European Commission gave to the three official European Standardisation Organisations (CEN, CENELEC and ETSI) and is the first European Standard for ICT products and services.

WCAG 2.2 became a W3C Recommendation on 5 October 2023. Nine new criteria make their definitive debut in this new version of the WCAG standard. New sections have also been introduced that detail aspects of the specification which may impact privacy and security.

=== Version 3 (under development) ===
In early 2021, the Accessibility Guidelines Working Group presented the first public working draft (FPWD) of the future WCAG 3.0, intended to provide a range of recommendations for making web content more accessible. As of November 2025, the WCAG 3.0 working draft was last updated in September 2025. No part of WCAG 3.0 is an official recommendation at this time. WCAG 3.0 is a draft undergoing significant development efforts, and the expected release date as an official recommendation is not defined.

== Versions ==
=== Version 1 ===
WCAG 1.0 consist of 14 guidelines—each of which describes a general principle of accessible design. Each guideline covers a basic theme of web accessibility and is associated with one or more checkpoints that describes how to apply that guideline to particular webpage features.

- Guideline 1: Provide equivalent alternatives to auditory and visual content
- Guideline 2: Do not rely on colour alone
- Guideline 3: Use markup and style sheets, and do so properly
- Guideline 4: Clarify natural language usage
- Guideline 5: Create tables that transform gracefully
- Guideline 6: Ensure that pages featuring new technologies transform gracefully
- Guideline 7: Ensure user control of time sensitive content changes
- Guideline 8: Ensure direct accessibility of embedded user interfaces
- Guideline 9: Design for device independence
- Guideline 10: User interim solutions
- Guideline 11: Use W3C technologies and guidelines
- Guideline 12: Provide context and orientation information
- Guideline 13: Provide clear navigation mechanisms
- Guideline 14: Ensure that documents are clear and simple

Each of the in total 65 WCAG 1.0 checkpoints has an assigned priority level based on the checkpoint's impact on accessibility:

- Priority 1: Web developers must satisfy these requirements, otherwise it will be impossible for one or more groups to access the Web content. Conformance to this level is described as A.
- Priority 2: Web developers should satisfy these requirements, otherwise some groups will find it difficult to access the Web content. Conformance to this level is described as AA or Double-A.
- Priority 3: Web developers may satisfy these requirements to make it easier for some groups to access the Web content. Conformance to this level is described as AAA or Triple-A.

=== Version 2 ===
WCAG 2.0 consist of twelve guidelines organized under four principles (websites must be perceivable, operable, understandable, and robust). Each guideline has testable success criteria (61 in all). The W3C's Techniques for WCAG 2.0 is a list of techniques that help authors meet the guidelines and success criteria. The techniques are periodically updated whereas the principles, guidelines and success criteria are stable and do not change. WCAG 2.0 uses the same three levels of conformance (A, AA, AAA) as WCAG 1.0, but has redefined them. The WCAG working group maintains an extensive list of web accessibility techniques and common failure cases for WCAG 2.0.

WCAG 2.1 is backwards-compatible with WCAG 2.0, which it extends with a further 17 success criteria.

WCAG 2.2 is backwards-compatible with WCAG 2.1 extending it a further nine success criteria and with WCAG 2.0 extending it a further 26 success criteria (including the 17 success criteria introduced by WCAG 2.1). Additionally, WCAG 2.2 has deprecated and removed the 4.1.1 success criterion.

WCAG 2 Guidelines
Principles	Guidelines	Success Criteria	Conformance Level	Revision
1: Perceivable	1.1 Text Alternatives	1.1.1 Non-text Content	A	2.0
1: Perceivable	1.2 Time-based Media	1.2.1 Audio-only and Video-only (Prerecorded)	A	2.0
1: Perceivable	1.2 Time-based Media	1.2.2 Captions (Prerecorded)	A	2.0
1: Perceivable	1.2 Time-based Media	1.2.3 Audio Description or Media Alternative (Prerecorded)	A	2.0
1: Perceivable	1.2 Time-based Media	1.2.4 Captions (Live)	AA	2.0
1: Perceivable	1.2 Time-based Media	1.2.5 Audio Description (Prerecorded)	AA	2.0
1: Perceivable	1.2 Time-based Media	1.2.6 Sign Language (Prerecorded)	AAA	2.0
1: Perceivable	1.2 Time-based Media	1.2.7 Extended Audio Description (Prerecorded)	AAA	2.0
1: Perceivable	1.2 Time-based Media	1.2.8 Media Alternative (Prerecorded)	AAA	2.0
1: Perceivable	1.2 Time-based Media	1.2.9 Audio-only (Live)	AAA	2.0
1: Perceivable	1.3 Adaptable	1.3.1 Info and Relationships	A	2.0
1: Perceivable	1.3 Adaptable	1.3.2 Meaningful Sequence	A	2.0
1: Perceivable	1.3 Adaptable	1.3.3 Sensory Characteristics	A	2.0
1: Perceivable	1.3 Adaptable	1.3.4 Orientation	AA	2.1
1: Perceivable	1.3 Adaptable	1.3.5 Identify Input Purpose	AA	2.1
1: Perceivable	1.3 Adaptable	1.3.6 Identify Purpose	AAA	2.1
1: Perceivable	1.4 Distinguishable	1.4.1 Use of Color	A	2.0
1: Perceivable	1.4 Distinguishable	1.4.2 Audio Control	A	2.0
1: Perceivable	1.4 Distinguishable	1.4.3 Contrast (Minimum)	AA	2.0
1: Perceivable	1.4 Distinguishable	1.4.4 Resize text	AA	2.0
1: Perceivable	1.4 Distinguishable	1.4.5 Images of Text	AA	2.0
1: Perceivable	1.4 Distinguishable	1.4.6 Contrast (Enhanced)	AAA	2.0
1: Perceivable	1.4 Distinguishable	1.4.7 Low or No Background Audio	AAA	2.0
1: Perceivable	1.4 Distinguishable	1.4.8 Visual Presentation	AAA	2.0
1: Perceivable	1.4 Distinguishable	1.4.9 Images of Text (No Exception)	AAA	2.0
1: Perceivable	1.4 Distinguishable	1.4.10 Reflow	AA	2.1
1: Perceivable	1.4 Distinguishable	1.4.11 Non-Text Contrast	AA	2.1
1: Perceivable	1.4 Distinguishable	1.4.12 Text Spacing	AA	2.1
1: Perceivable	1.4 Distinguishable	1.4.13 Content on Hover or Focus	AA	2.1
2: Operable	2.1 Keyboard Accessible	2.1.1 Keyboard	A	2.0
2: Operable	2.1 Keyboard Accessible	2.1.2 No Keyboard Trap	A	2.0
2: Operable	2.1 Keyboard Accessible	2.1.3 Keyboard (No Exception)	AAA	2.0
2: Operable	2.1 Keyboard Accessible	2.1.4 Character Key Shortcuts	A	2.1
2: Operable	2.2 Enough Time	2.2.1 Timing Adjustable	A	2.0
2: Operable	2.2 Enough Time	2.2.2 Pause, Stop, Hide	A	2.0
2: Operable	2.2 Enough Time	2.2.3 No Timing	AAA	2.0
2: Operable	2.2 Enough Time	2.2.4 Interruptions	AAA	2.0
2: Operable	2.2 Enough Time	2.2.5 Re-authenticating	AAA	2.0
2: Operable	2.2 Enough Time	2.2.6 Timeouts	AAA	2.1
2: Operable	2.3 Seizures	2.3.1 Three Flashes or Below Threshold	A	2.0
2: Operable	2.3 Seizures	2.3.2 Three Flashes	AAA	2.0
2: Operable	2.3 Seizures	2.3.3 Animation from Interactions	AAA	2.1
2: Operable	2.4 Navigable	2.4.1 Bypass Blocks	A	2.0
2: Operable	2.4 Navigable	2.4.2 Page Titled	A	2.0
2: Operable	2.4 Navigable	2.4.3 Focus Order	A	2.0
2: Operable	2.4 Navigable	2.4.4 Link Purpose (In Context)	A	2.0
2: Operable	2.4 Navigable	2.4.5 Multiple Ways	AA	2.0
2: Operable	2.4 Navigable	2.4.6 Headings and Labels	AA	2.0
2: Operable	2.4 Navigable	2.4.7 Focus Visible	AA	2.0
2: Operable	2.4 Navigable	2.4.8 Location	AAA	2.0
2: Operable	2.4 Navigable	2.4.9 Link Purpose (Link Only)	AAA	2.0
2: Operable	2.4 Navigable	2.4.10 Section Headings	AAA	2.0
2: Operable	2.4 Navigable	2.4.11 Focus Not Obscured (Minimum)	AA	2.2
2: Operable	2.4 Navigable	2.4.12 Focus Not Obscured (Enhanced)	AAA	2.2
2: Operable	2.4 Navigable	2.4.13 Focus Appearance	AAA	2.2
2: Operable	2.5 Input Modalities	2.5.1 Pointer Gestures	A	2.1
2: Operable	2.5 Input Modalities	2.5.2 Pointer Cancellation	A	2.1
2: Operable	2.5 Input Modalities	2.5.3 Label in Name	A	2.1
2: Operable	2.5 Input Modalities	2.5.4 Motion Actuation	A	2.1
2: Operable	2.5 Input Modalities	2.5.5 Target Size	AAA	2.1
2: Operable	2.5 Input Modalities	2.5.6 Concurrent Input Mechanisms	AAA	2.1
2: Operable	2.5 Input Modalities	2.5.7 Dragging Movements	AA	2.2
2: Operable	2.5 Input Modalities	2.5.8 Target Size (Minimum)	AA	2.2
3: Understandable	3.1 Readable	3.1.1 Language of Page	A	2.0
3: Understandable	3.1 Readable	3.1.2 Language of Parts	AA	2.0
3: Understandable	3.1 Readable	3.1.3 Unusual Words	AAA	2.0
3: Understandable	3.1 Readable	3.1.4 Abbreviations	AAA	2.0
3: Understandable	3.1 Readable	3.1.5 Reading Level	AAA	2.0
3: Understandable	3.1 Readable	3.1.6 Pronunciation	AAA	2.0
3: Understandable	3.2 Predictable	3.2.1 On Focus	A	2.0
3: Understandable	3.2 Predictable	3.2.2 On Input	A	2.0
3: Understandable	3.2 Predictable	3.2.3 Consistent Navigation	AA	2.0
3: Understandable	3.2 Predictable	3.2.4 Consistent Identification	AA	2.0
3: Understandable	3.2 Predictable	3.2.5 Change on Request	AAA	2.0
3: Understandable	3.2 Predictable	3.2.6 Consistent Help	A	2.2
3: Understandable	3.3 Input Assistance	3.3.1 Error Identification	A	2.0
3: Understandable	3.3 Input Assistance	3.3.2 Labels or Instructions	A	2.0
3: Understandable	3.3 Input Assistance	3.3.3 Error Suggestion	AA	2.0
3: Understandable	3.3 Input Assistance	3.3.4 Error Prevention (Legal, Financial, Data)	AA	2.0
3: Understandable	3.3 Input Assistance	3.3.5 Help	AAA	2.0
3: Understandable	3.3 Input Assistance	3.3.6 Error Prevention (All)	AAA	2.0
3: Understandable	3.3 Input Assistance	3.3.7 Redundant Entry	A	2.2
3: Understandable	3.3 Input Assistance	3.3.8 Accessible Authentication (Minimum)	AA	2.2
3: Understandable	3.3 Input Assistance	3.3.9 Accessible Authentication (Enhanced)	AAA	2.2
4: Robust	4.1 Compatible	~~4.1.1 Parsing~~ (deprecated by WCAG 2.2)	~~A~~	~~2.0~~
4: Robust	4.1 Compatible	4.1.2 Name, Role, Value	A	2.0
4: Robust	4.1 Compatible	4.1.3 Status Messages	AA	2.1

== WCAG referenced by law ==
This section only refers to specific instances where WCAG, or a closely related derivative thereof, is specifically codified into law. There are many laws relating to accessibility in general and which may apply to websites, though they do not necessarily refer to WCAG. It is nevertheless considered prudent to follow WCAG guidelines to help protect against potential lawsuits relating to accessibility.

Some jurisdictions are moving to build legislation around the latest recommended release of the Web Content Accessibility Guidelines by the World Wide Web Consortium's Web Accessibility Initiative. This ensures that the policies remain up to date.

=== Australia ===
The Australian government has mandated via the Disability Discrimination Act 1992 that all Australian government websites meet the WCAG 2.0 level A accessibility requirements.

=== Canada ===
Regulations under the Accessibility for Ontarians with Disabilities Act, 2005 require that public web content of certain Ontario organizations complies with WCAG 2.0 Level AA.

In 2010 Donna Jodhan brought a case to the Supreme Court of Canada against the Government of Canada. In 2012 the Supreme Court arrived at what is now known as the Jodhan decision caused the Canadian federal government to require all online web pages, documents and videos available externally and internally to meet the accessibility requirements of WCAG 2.0.

In 2019, the Government of Canada implemented the Accessible Canada Act.

=== European Union ===
Directive 2016/2102 requires websites and mobile applications of public sector (i.e. government) bodies to conform to WCAG 2.1 Level AA. As of June 2021, the directive covers websites and mobile apps. The European Parliament approved the directive in October 2016, the European Commission updated the WCAG reference from 2.0 to 2.1 in December 2018.

The European Accessibility Act (EAA) became legally applicable in EU member states on 28 June 2025. The EAA will require websites, apps, ebooks, ecommerce platforms, PDFs and others to conform to WCAG 2.1 AA criteria within the EU.

=== Israel ===
The Israeli Ministry of Justice published regulations in early 2014, requiring Internet websites to comply with Israeli Standard 5568, which is based on the W3C Web Content Accessibility Guidelines 2.0.

The main differences between the Israeli standard and the W3C standard concern the requirements to provide captions and texts for audio and video media. The Israeli standards are somewhat more lenient, reflecting the current technical difficulties in providing such captions and texts in Hebrew.

=== Norway ===
In 2013, the Ministry of Public Administration and Church Affairs announced Regulations on universal design of information and communication technology (ICT) solutions, under the Equality and Accessibility Act. The regulations obliges both private and public bodies to adhere to universal design and require that “web solutions shall at least be designed in accordance with the WCAG 2.0 standard, at levels A and AA, with the exception of success criteria 1.2.3, 1.2.4 and 1.2.5, or an equivalent standard.”

=== United Kingdom ===
In September 2018, website and mobile app accessibility regulations for the public sector came into force, titled the Public Sector Bodies (Websites and Mobile Applications) Accessibility Regulations 2018, which currently applies the WCAG 2.1 AA level to websites operated by the "public sector", which means government agencies or organizations funded by the government, with some exclusions. The UK government published Understanding accessibility requirements for public sector bodies to guide compliance.

The UK government is yet to announce if it will confirm the European Accessibility Act (EAA) into local law, but companies in the UK and outside of the EU will need to comply with EAA if they sell products or services in any EU member state.

=== United States ===
In 2013, the US Department of Transportation amended its regulations implementing the Air Carrier Access Act (ACAA) to require Airlines make their websites accessible, requiring conformance to WCAG 2.0, meeting Level AA Success Criteria.

In January 2017, the US Access Board approved a final rule to update Section 508 of the Rehabilitation Act of 1973. The new rule adopts seventeen WCAG 2.0 success criteria, but 22 of the 38 existing A-level and AA-level criteria were already covered by existing Section 508 guidelines. The rule requires adherence to the new standards twelve months from its date of publication in the federal register.

In December, 2021 the 11th circuit court vacated a sometimes-cited case from 2017, which had referred to the WCAG guidelines as "industry standard". The 11th circuit court's ruling rendered the 2017 case moot. As such, the case is no longer citable as caselaw. On March 2, 2022, the 11th circuit court refused to rehear the case.

On April 24, 2024, the Federal Register published the Department of Justice’s (DOJ) final rule updating its regulations for Title II of the Americans with Disabilities Act (ADA). The final rule states that the Web Content Accessibility Guidelines (WCAG) Version 2.1, Level AA is the technical standard for state and local governments’ web content and mobile apps.
