= European Accessibility Act =

2019 European Union directive

The European Accessibility Act (EAA) is a directive of the European Union (EU) which took effect in April 2019. This directive aims to improve the trade between members of the EU for accessible products and services, by removing country-specific rules. Businesses benefit from having a common set of rules within the EU, which should facilitate easier cross-border trade. It should also allow a greater market for companies providing accessible products and services. Persons with disabilities and elderly people will benefit from having more accessible products and services in the market. An increased market size should produce more competitive prices. There should be fewer barriers within the EU and more job opportunities as well.

Originally proposed in 2011, this act was built to complement the EU's Web Accessibility Directive which targets the public sector and became law in 2016. It also reflects the obligations of the UN's Convention on the Rights of Persons with Disabilities. It includes a wide range of systems including personal devices such as computers, smartphones, e-books, and TVs, as well as public services like television broadcast, automated teller machine (ATMs), ticketing machines, public transport services, banking services, and e-commerce sites.

The laws, regulations and administrative provisions necessary to comply with this Directive have to be adopted and published by the member states by 28 June 2022. Three years later, in 2025, the requirements of the European Accessibility Act must have been implemented.

== Compliance deadline (2025) ==
Under the provisions of the European Accessibility Act (EAA), all relevant products and services made available on the EU market must now comply with accessibility requirements defined by the directive. The EAA aims to improve the functioning of the internal market for accessible products and services by removing barriers created by divergent rules in different member states. It is also intended to improve access for persons with disabilities and the elderly.

The requirements and obligations of this Directive do not apply to microenterprises providing services within the scope of this Directive – whereby ‘microenterprise’ means an enterprise which employs fewer than 10 persons and which has an annual turnover not exceeding €2 million or an annual balance sheet total not exceeding €2 million.

The European policy of applying "Design for all" principles on digital technology led to the creation of the European Harmonized Accessibility Standards EN 301 549 which defines "Accessibility requirements suitable for public procurement of ICT products and services in Europe".

== Key requirements ==
The EAA outlines general accessibility standards for all products and services within its scope with additional requirements for specific products and services.

For products, businesses must:

- Design products to maximise usability for individuals with disabilities;
- Provide accessible instructions for use and maintenance;
- Ensure packaging and support services are accessible;

For services, requirements include:

- Ensuring websites and mobile apps are accessible;
- Providing information on service features in accessible formats;
- Offering customer support systems that cater to people with disabilities;

These standards aim to improve usability and foster inclusivity across the EU.

== Conformity assessment ==
The European Accessibility Act allows economic operators to declare their own conformity with the directive. Unlike some other CE-marking directives, the EAA does not provide for notified body involvement or third-party certification.

For products, the route is set out in Article 14 and Annex IV — the internal production control procedure, based on Module A of Decision No 768/2008/EC. The manufacturer prepares the technical documentation, carries out the conformity assessment, issues the EU declaration of conformity, and applies the CE marking.

Services follow a different mechanism. Under Article 13 and Annex V, the provider assesses its own compliance and publishes that assessment in its general terms and conditions or an equivalent public document. The published text must describe the service, explain how it works, and set out how each applicable accessibility requirement is met.

In both cases, responsibility for the assessment rests with the economic operator. Technical documentation — or, for services, equivalent records — must be retained and made available to national market surveillance authorities on request. Those authorities may verify the self-assessment against the requirements of the directive. Application of the harmonised standard EN 301 549, cited in the Official Journal under the directive, confers a presumption of conformity.

== Accessibility widgets ==
Accessibility widgets are generally not sufficient on their own to address all requirements of the European Accessibility Act (EAA) or the Web Content Accessibility Guidelines (WCAG).

Such widgets typically operate as user interface layers that provide optional adjustments to visual presentation, including changes to text size, color contrast, or font appearance. These features may improve usability for some users but do not alter the underlying structure or source code of a website.

Meeting WCAG success criteria and related accessibility legislation commonly involves changes to website markup, semantics, and interaction patterns, such as proper use of HTML elements, form labeling, keyboard navigation, and compatibility with assistive technologies. For this reason, accessibility widgets are often described as complementary tools rather than replacements for code-level accessibility remediation.

== Country-specific requirements ==
This Directive, has been transposed into national laws by each Member State. Each nation has implemented it in their own way, producing a range of specific legal texts, enforcement authorities, and penalties. Each country may have their own legislation which will restrict the use of lawsuits.

Highlevel summary of national comparisons
Country	National Legislation	Enforcement Authority	Fines & Penalties
Austria	The Web Accessibility Act (German: Barrierefreiheitsgesetz(BaFG))	Federal Minister for Agriculture, Regions, and Tourism (German: Sozialministeriumservice)	Up to €80,000 (reduced to €50,000 for SMEs and micro-enterprises)
Belgium	Belgian Accessibility Act amending the Belgian Code of Economic Law	Fragmented: FPS Economy, BIPT, and other federal, community, and regional agencies	
Bulgaria	Accessibility Requirements for Products and Services Act (Bulgarian: Закон за изискванията за достъпност на продукти и услуги, commonly referred to as ARPSA)	Various agencies	BGN 750 – 2 500
Croatia	NN 89/2025 (13.6.2025), Act on Accessibility Requirements for Products and Services (Croatian: O PROGLAŠENJU ZAKONA O ZAHTJEVIMA ZA PRISTUPAČNOST PROIZVODA I USLUGA)	Ministry of Labour, Pension System, Family and Social Policy	
Cyprus	Official publication: Cyprus Gazette; Number: 4996 (Greek: Ο περί της Προσβασιμότητας Προϊόντων και Υπηρεσιών Νόμος)		
Czech Republic	Act No 424/2023 on accessibility requirements for certain products and services (Czech: Zákon č. 424/2023 Sb., o požadavcích na přístupnost některých výrobků a služeb)		
Denmark	Amendment of the Act on accessibility requirements for products and services (Danish: Ændring af lov om tilgængelighedskrav for produkter og tjenester)		
Estonia	Accessibility of Products and Services Act (Estonian: Toodete ja teenuste ligipääsetavuse seadus)		
Finland	Government Decree on accessibility requirements for certain digital services (Valtioneuvoston asetus eräiden digitaalisten palvelujen saavutettavuusvaatimuksista / Statsrådets förordning om tillgänglighetskrav för vissa digitala tjänster (179/2023) 16.2.2023)	Finnish Transport and Communications Agency (Traficom)	No fines or penalties (up to 2024).
France	Decree No 2023-931 of 9 October 2023 on the accessibility of products and services for persons with disabilities (French: Décret n° 2023-931 du 9 octobre 2023 relatif à l'accessibilité aux personnes handicapées des produits et services)	DGCCRF (default for most consumer products and services); ARCOM (audiovisual, public sector, large companies under Law 2005-102); ARCEP (electronic communications); ACPR (banking/insurance); AMF (financial markets); DINUM (public sector digital – RGAA).	EAA-specific: €7,500 per infraction for legal entities (€15,000 on recidivism). Law 2005-102: €50,000 for non-compliance; €25,000 for missing accessibility statement or multi-year plan. Law 2005-102 fines renewable every six months.
Germany	Accessibility Strengthening Act - (German: Barrierefreiheitsstärkungsgesetz (BFSG))		
Greece	Incorporation of Directive (EU) 2019/882 of the European Parliament and of the Council of 17 April 2019 on the accessibility requirements for products and services and other urgent provisions to promote development. (Greek: Ενσωμάτωση της Οδηγίας (ΕΕ) 2019/882 του Ευρωπαϊκού Κοινοβουλίου και του Συμβουλίου της 17ης Απριλίου 2019 σχετικά με τις απαιτήσεις προσβασιμότητας προϊόντων και υπηρεσιών και άλλες επείγουσες διατάξεις για την ενίσχυση της ανάπτυξης.)		
Hungary	XII. Government Decree No XVII of 2022 implementing Act XVII of 2022 laying down general rules on compliance with accessibility requirements for products and services (Hungarian: A Kormány 605/2022. (XII. 28.) Korm. rendelete a termékekre és a szolgáltatásokra vonatkozó akadálymentességi követelményeknek való megfelelés általános szabályairól szóló 2022. évi XVII. törvény végrehajtásáról)		
Ireland	Accessibility Requirements of Products and Services		
Italy	Legislative DECREE No 82 of 27 May 2022 Implementation of Directive (EU) 2019/882 of the European Parliament and of the Council of 17 April 2019 on the accessibility requirements for products and services. (Italian: DECRETO LEGISLATIVO 27 maggio 2022, n. 82 Attuazione della direttiva (UE) 2019/882 del Parlamento europeo e del Consiglio, del 17 aprile 2019, sui requisiti di accessibilità dei prodotti e dei servizi.)		
Latvia	Law on the accessibility of goods and services (Latvian: Preču un pakalpojumu piekļūstamības likums)		
Lithuania	Law No XIV-1633 of the Republic of Lithuania on accessibility requirements for products and services (Lithuanian: Lietuvos Respublikos gaminių ir paslaugų prieinamumo reikalavimų įstatymas Nr. XIV-1633)		
Luxembourg	Law of March 8, 2023 relating to accessibility requirements applicable to products and services (French: Loi du 8 mars 2023 relative aux exigences en matière d’accessibilité applicables aux produits et services)		
Malta	Accessibility Measures (European Accessibility Act) Regulations (Subsidiary Legislation 627.03)		
Netherlands	Decision on rules on the accessibility of products in relation to the implementation of Directive (EU) 2019/882 of the European Parliament and of the Council of 17 April 2019 on accessibility requirements for products and services (OJ L 2019, 151) (Accessibility Requirements Act 2024) (Dutch: Besluit houdende houdende regels inzake de toegankelijkheid van producten in verband met de implementatie van Richtlijn (EU) 2019/882 van het Europees Parlement en de Raad van 17 april 2019 inzake toegankelijkheidsvoorschriften voor producten en diensten (PbEU 2019, L 151) (Warenwetbesluit toegankelijkheidsvoorschriften 2024))		
Poland	Act of 26 April 2024 on ensuring compliance with accessibility requirements for certain products and services by economic operators (Polish: USTAWA z dnia 26 kwietnia 2024 r. o zapewnianiu spełniania wymagań dostępności niektórych produktów i usług przez podmioty gospodarcze)		
Portugal	Corrigendum to Decree-Law No 82/2022 of 6 December transposing Directive (EU) 2019/882 on the accessibility requirements for products and services (Portuguese: Declaração de Retificação n.º 5/2023, de 2 de fevereiro, Retifica o Decreto-Lei n.º 82/2022, de 6 de dezembro, que transpõe a Diretiva (UE) 2019/882, relativa aos requisitos de acessibilidade de produtos e serviços, Diário da República n.º 24/2023)		
Romania	Law 232/2022 on accessibility requirements for products and services (Romanian: Legea nr. 232/2022 privind cerințele de accesibilitate aplicabile produselor și serviciilor)		
Slovakia	Act No 351/2022 on the accessibility of products and services for persons with disabilities and amending certain acts (Slovakian: Zákon č. 351/2022 Z. z. o prístupnosti výrobkov a služieb pre osoby so zdravotným postihnutím a o zmene a doplnení niektorých zákonov)		
Slovenia	Act on Access to Products and Services for Persons with Disabilities (Slovenian: Zakon o dostopnosti do proizvodov in storitev za invalide)		
Spain	Order TMA/851/2021 of 23 July 2013 laying down the technical document on basic conditions of accessibility and non-discrimination for access to and use of urbanised public spaces. (Spanish: Orden TMA/851/2021, de 23 de julio, por la que se desarrolla el documento técnico de condiciones básicas de accesibilidad y no discriminación para el acceso y la utilización de los espacios públicos urbanizados.)		
Sweden	Act on the Accessibility of Certain Products and Services (Swedish: Lag om vissa produkters och tjänsters tillgänglighet)		

== See also ==
- Web Accessibility Directive for the public sector.
- Accessible Canada Act (2019) for the corresponding Canadian federal legislation.
- Americans with Disabilities Act (1990) for the corresponding American federal legislation.
- Disability Discrimination Act (1995) and Equality Act (2010) for the corresponding UK legislation.
