= Accessibility for Manitobans Act =

Canadian provincial law

Legislative Assembly of Manitoba
- Citation: SM 2013, c 40 or CCSM c A1.7
- Assented to: December 5, 2013
- Commenced: December 5, 2013
- Administered by: Minister responsible for Accessibility

Legislative history
- Introduced by: Jennifer Howard MLA, Minister of Family Services and Labour
- First reading: April 24, 2013
- Second reading: September 12, 2013
- Third reading: December 3, 2013
- Status: In force

The Accessibility for Manitobans Act (French: Loi sur l'accessibilité pour les Manitobains, AMA) is an act of the Legislative Assembly of Manitoba concerned with the development of accessibility standards in Manitoba to prevent and remove barriers that affect persons with disabilities.

The legislation includes accessibility standards that act as regulations under law. As each new accessibility standard is introduced, there are new requirements and deadlines for affected employers, organizations, and businesses.

The Act has been in effect since December 5, 2013, and its standards were implemented through the introduction of five key areas of daily life: customer service, information & communication, transportation, employment, and design of public spaces.

== Accessibility standards ==
The Accessibility for Manitobans Act includes accessibility standards that act as regulations under law. As each new accessibility standard is introduced, there are new requirements and deadlines for affected employers, organizations, and businesses. As the AMA is not based on complaints, individual complaints are not investigated and mediation services are not offered under this legislation.

Manitoba's accessibility standards revolve around 5 "key areas of daily living": customer service, information & communication, transportation, employment, and design of public spaces.

- Accessibility Standard for Customer Service (effective November 1, 2015) — addresses business practices and training requirements to provide better customer service to people with disabilities.
- Employment (effective May 1, 2019) — addresses practices related to employee recruitment, hiring, and retention.
- Information & Communication (effective May 1, 2022) — "addresses barriers to accessing and providing information," including information provided in print, in person, on websites, or in other formats.
- Design of Public Spaces — addresses access to areas outside the jurisdiction of The Manitoba Building Code, such as sidewalks, pathways, parks, and other aspects of the built environment.
- Transportation — addresses barriers related to public transportation.

== Administration ==
The minister tasked with overseeing the administration of this Act is the Minister responsible for Accessibility, who is ex officio typically the Minister of Families. The Compliance Director, who directly reports to the Minister, is responsible for the general administration of the AMA.

The Accessibility Advisory Council advises and makes recommendations for accessibility standards to the Minister. The Council is made up of members of the disability community and affected stakeholders, including representatives of business, municipalities, and other organizations.

The Manitoba Accessibility Office (MAO) is the administrative arm of the AMA, acting as secretary to the Accessibility Advisory Council and its committees.

Under the provincial Department of Families, the Manitoba’s Accessibility Compliance Secretariat monitors compliance of accessibility legislation, including the AMA, among stakeholders in the private, non-profit, and public sectors.

== See also ==
- Manitoba Human Rights Commission
- Ontarians with Disabilities Act — corresponding Ontario legislation.
- Accessibility Act (Nova Scotia) — corresponding Nova Scotia legislation.
- Accessibility Act (Newfoundland and Labrador) — corresponding Newfoundland and Labrador legislation.
- Accessible British Columbia Act — corresponding British Columbia legislation.
- Accessible Canada Act — corresponding Canadian federal legislation
- Disability Discrimination Act 1995 — corresponding UK legislation.
- Americans with Disabilities Act of 1990 — corresponding American legislation.
