= Accessible British Columbia Act =

Legislative Assembly of British Columbia
- Citation: S.B.C. 2021, c. 19
- Assented to: June 17, 2021

Legislative history
- Bill citation: Bill 6
- Introduced by: Nicholas Simons MLA, Minister of Social Development and Poverty Reduction
- First reading: April 28, 2021
- Second reading: May 10, 2021
- Third reading: June 3, 2021
- Status: Current legislation

The Accessible British Columbia Act is an act of the Legislative Assembly of British Columbia.

== Provisions ==
This act commits the government of British Columbia to promote accessibility, recognize AccessAbility Week, and officially recognize both American Sign Language & Indigenous sign languages. There will be annual reports that will be published for each fiscal year, describing the actions taken by the minister and the provincial accessibility committee. This act will be reviewed every 5 years until 2031 when it will be reviewed every ten years after that. This act applies to the government as well as some other prescribed organizations.

This act intends to put the standards in place by the end of 2022. There is enthusiasm from many in the disability community, including the deaf, hard of hearing community. The act includes $4.8 million from the Ministry of Social Development and Poverty Reduction to support small business employers hire people with disabilities.

== Reception ==
This bill has met with some criticism as communications disabilities were excluded from the bill's definition. There is uncertainty about how this bill will be enforced and how people with disabilities will be represented.

== See also ==
- Ontarians with Disabilities Act for the corresponding Ontario legislation.
- Accessibility for Manitobans Act for the corresponding Manitoba legislation.
- Accessibility Act (Nova Scotia) for the corresponding Nova Scotia legislation.
- Accessible Canada Act
- Disability Discrimination Act for the corresponding UK legislation.
- Americans with Disabilities Act of 1990 for the corresponding American legislation.
