= Accessibility Act (Nova Scotia) =

Provincial legislation in Canada

Nova Scotia House of Assembly
- Long title: An Act Respecting Accessibility in Nova Scotia
- Assented to: April 28, 2017
- Commenced: September 18, 2017

Legislative history
- Introduced by: Joanne Bernard MLA, Minister of Community Services
- First reading: November 2, 2016
- Second reading: November 3, 2016
- Third reading: April 27, 2017
- Status: Current legislation

The Accessibility Act was passed by the House of Assembly of Nova Scotia in 2017. It is similar to the Accessibility for Manitobans Act, and further supports the rights of People with Disabilities (PwD) under the Canadian Charter of Rights and Freedoms.

The goals of the Act is to prevent and remove barriers for the delivery and receipt of goods and services, information and communication, public transportation and transportation infrastructure, employment, the built environment, education, and a prescribed activity or undertaking. The Act establishes an Accessibility Directorate and an Accessibility Advisory Board to support this work.

Nova Scotia's Accessibility Directorate has responsibility for administering the Accessibility Act and advancing disability issues within the government. This Act commits the government of Nova Scotia to develop accessibility standards for goods and services, information and communication, transportation, employment, the built environment and education.

== See also ==
- Nova Scotia Human Rights Commission
- Ontarians with Disabilities Act for the corresponding Ontario legislation.
- The Accessibility for Manitobans Act for the corresponding Manitoba legislation.
- Accessible British Columbia Act
- Accessible Canada Act
- Disability Discrimination Act for the corresponding UK legislation.
- Americans with Disabilities Act of 1990 for the corresponding American legislation.
