= Accessibility for Ontarians with Disabilities Act =

Statute of Ontario, Canada

Accessibility for Ontarians with Disabilities Act, 2005

Legislative Assembly of Ontario
- Long title: An Act respecting the development, implementation and enforcement of standards relating to accessibility with respect to goods, services, facilities, employment, accommodation, buildings and all other things specified in the Act for persons with disabilities
- Enacted by: Legislative Assembly of Ontario
- Royal assent: 13 June 2005
- Commenced: 13 June 2005

Legislative history
- First reading: 12 October 2004
- Second reading: 18 November 2004; 22 November 2004; 25 November 2004; 2 December 2004
- Third reading: 9 May 2005; 10 May 2005
- Status: In force

The Accessibility for Ontarians with Disabilities Act, 2005 (French: Loi de 2005 sur l'accessibilité pour les personnes handicapées de l'Ontario, AODA) is a statute enacted in 2005 by the Legislative Assembly of Ontario in Canada. Its purpose is to improve accessibility standards for Ontarians with physical and mental disabilities to all public establishments by 2025.

Some businesses began taking steps to bring their organizations into compliance in 2005. Compliance deadline dates depend on the size of the institution and the sector in which it operates.

== Ontarians with Disabilities Act ==
In 2001, the government of Ontario passed into law the Ontarians with Disabilities Act, 2001, requiring the government to adopt practices that eliminate barriers to participation of individuals with disabilities. Such practices are adopted by consultation with groups and individuals affected by or representing those with disabilities. These include defining building and structure guidelines, only leasing properties compliant with the guidelines, and sourcing products which "must have regard to their accessibility for persons with disabilities".

The Ontarians with Disabilities Act is the short title of the Ontario government's Bill 125 - An Act to improve the identification, removal and prevention of barriers faced by persons with disabilities and to make related amendments to other Acts. The act received royal assent on 14 December 2001 and came into force on February 7, 2002. The bill's original purpose had been to achieve a barrier-free Ontario for persons with disabilities—a right of full participation. The act required all government ministries and municipal governments to prepare accessibility plans to identify, remove, and prevent barriers to participation throughout their operations. By 31 December 2002, all provincial websites were required to be accessible. Other institutions required to provide annual plans addressing accessibility issues included public transportation systems, hospitals, district school boards, universities, colleges of applied arts and technology, and other government agencies.

Those who supported the idea of an ODA hoped that it would require government bodies, and others bound by law to identify the barriers that they now have which impede persons with disabilities from full participation, and to design reasonable plans consistent with their resources to remove these barriers and to prevent new ones from being created, all within reasonable timelines. They wanted it to allow for the enactment of regulations with input from disability groups, business interests and others, to set out measures to be implemented to achieve the ODA's goals and reasonable timelines for their achievement. It was meant to incorporate an effective, fair and timely process for enforcement.

The legislation was regarded as weak, as it had no enforcement, imposed no penalties, and required no deadlines. Groups lobbied the government to improve the legislation.

== Act ==
The scope of the legislation includes both public and private institutions. It targets the removal of barriers to participation.

By 2015, five standards have been established as regulations enacted by the government.

The first was the "Customer Service Standard", taking effect on 1 January 2008. This standard requires that individuals with disabilities are able "to obtain, use and benefit from goods and services". This includes businesses granting access to service animals and support people in publicly-accessible areas, provide accessible customer service, and implement a feedback system.

The "Integrated Accessibility Standards Regulation" took effect on 1 July 2011. It consisted of three component standards addressing accessibility of information and communications, employment, and transportation. On 1 January 2013, the "Design of Public Spaces (Built Environment)" standard took effect, and became part of the "Integrated Accessibility Standards Regulation".

== Reviews ==
There have been two legislative reviews of AODA, which are conducted to assess the progress of implementing accessibility throughout the province. The first review was conducted by Charles Beer and published in February 2010. The second review was conducted by Mayo Moran and published in November 2014.

David Onley, who served as lieutenant governor of Ontario from 2007 until 2014, and who had partial paralysis as a result of childhood polio, was a special advisor on accessibility. The Accessibility Standards Advisory Council also provides advice to review committees. In 2019, Onley submitted a third review of AODA to the provincial legislature, which found that the province was very far from meeting the legislation's planned 2025 date for full accessibility. He gave 15 recommendations, such as training architects on inclusive design, faster design and implementation of standards, overhauling outdated digital standards, increasing enforcement, educating children on the issue, and increasing financial incentives among others.

== Legacy ==
In 2015, a patron of a restaurant in Northern Ontario and her daughter, previously a waitress at that restaurant, were awarded a combined $25,000 because the owner refused service to the patron, who was accompanied by a registered service animal. The Ontario Human Rights Tribunal stated that the owner discriminated against the customer on the basis of disability, and against the waitress on the basis of family status, as the owner prohibited the waitress from serving her mother.

Barbara Turnbull, a quadriplegic Toronto Star reporter, wrote in a memoir ebook that the government of Ontario has not enacted sufficient standards regulations to "ensure full accessibility by 2025". She advocated for enforced mandatory standards.

== See also ==
- Accessible Canada Act for the corresponding federal legislation.
- Accessibility Act (Nova Scotia) for the corresponding Nova Scotia legislation.
- Accessibility Act (Newfoundland and Labrador) for the corresponding Newfoundland and Labrador legislation.
- Accessibility for Manitobans Act for the corresponding Manitoba legislation.
- Accessible British Columbia Act for the corresponding British Columbia legislation.
- Accessible Saskatchewan Act for the corresponding Saskatchewan legislation.
- Disability Discrimination Act 1995 for the corresponding UK legislation.
- Americans with Disabilities Act of 1990 for the corresponding American legislation.
