= Accessible Canada Act =

Legislation to prohibit disability discrimination

Parliament of Canada
- Long title: An Act to ensure a barrier-free Canada
- Citation: S.C. 2019, c. 10
- Considered by: House of Commons of Canada
- Considered by: Senate of Canada
- Assented to: June 21, 2019

Legislative history

Initiating chamber: House of Commons of Canada
- Bill citation: Bill C-81
- Introduced by: Carla Qualtrough MP, Minister of Public Services and Procurement and Accessibility
- First reading: June 20, 2018
- Second reading: November 19, 2018
- Third reading: November 27, 2018

Revising chamber: Senate of Canada
- Member(s) in charge: Jim Munson
- First reading: November 29, 2018
- Second reading: March 20, 2019
- Third reading: May 13, 2019
- Status: Current legislation

The Accessible Canada Act (ACA; French: Loi canadienne sur l'accessibilité) is a Canada-wide accessibility act that applies to the federal public sector, Crown corporations, and all federally-regulated organizations, building on the Canadian Human Rights Act, and focuses on the prohibition of discrimination based on disability.

Carla Qualtrough presented Bill C-81 for its final reading on June 21, 2019, where it received Royal Assent. It is the first national Canadian legislation on accessibility that affects all government departments and federally-regulated agencies. The federally regulated organizations include the following industries:

- railways, airplanes, and inter-provincial buses;
- banks, mining companies, railways, airlines, and trucking; and
- television and radio.

== Background and preparation ==
Bill C-81: An Act to Ensure a Barrier-Free Canada, was tabled in June 2018 by Carla Qualtrough, then-Minister of Public Services and Procurement and Accessibility, following consultations that began in July 2016 by the Government of Canada with over 6,000 Canadians on the issue of accessibility in Canada.

The Office of Public Service Accessibility (OPSA) was established to prepare the public service to meet or exceed the requirements of Bill C-81, and to create the Act's implementation strategy. OPSA's mandate expired in March 2021.

The Act created the Canadian Accessibility Standards Development Organization (now Accessibility Standards Canada) in 2019 as a departmental corporation to create accessibility standards for federally-regulated entities and federal organizations.

== Accessibility Standards Canada ==
Accessibility Standards Canada
Agency overview
- Formed: 2019
- Preceding agency: Canadian Accessibility Standards Development Organization
- Agency executives: Philip Fawzi Rizcallah, CEO; Paul-Claude Bérubé, Chair
- Website: https://accessible.canada.ca

Accessibility Standards Canada is an accredited standards development organization responsible for developing accessibility standards to be integrated into Canada's federal regulations. Impacted federally-regulated entities and federal organizations include, among others, government buildings, banks, and federal courts.

ASC was created under the Accessible Canada Act in 2019 as the Canadian Accessibility Standards Development Organization (CASDO). Initial priority areas were defined as: Employment; Emergency measures; Built environment including parks and outdoor recreation facilities; Information and communication technologies; Indigenous accessibility; Accessible communications. Standards apply to any organization governed by the Canada Labour Code, including:

- parliamentary bodies, including
  - the Senate;
  - the House of Commons;
  - the Library of Parliament;
  - the office of the Senate Ethics Officer;
  - the office of the Conflict of Interest and Ethics Commissioner;
  - the Parliamentary Protective Service; and
  - the office of the Parliamentary Budget Officer.
- the Government of Canada and the federal public service, including government departments, agencies, and Crown corporations
- federal courts and tribunals
- the Canadian Armed Forces and the Royal Canadian Mounted Police (RCMP), taking into account certain job needs
- private-sector bodies under federal rule, including organizations in
  - the federal transportation network;
  - the broadcasting and telecommunications sectors; and
  - the banking sector.

== Legislated roles ==
The ACA created the position of an Accessibility Commissioner and Chief Accessibility Officer. The Accessibility Commissioner has the authority to fine organizations up to $250,000 per violation.

The Accessibility Commissioner has broad powers to conduct investigations of complaints. If the complaint is substantiated, they have the power to order the appropriate corrective measures and pay compensation to the complainant.

== Mandates and goals ==
As defined, the ACA will require the public sector to:

- hire 5,000 new employees who identify as people with disabilities over five years (1,000/year);
- review anything which may be a barrier for the public or the public sector;
- create an initial accessibility plan by one year after a date determined by regulations;
- publish an updated accessibility plan, and notify the Accessibility Commissioner, on an annual basis outlining progress to-date. This plan must be made available to people on request.
- consult persons with disabilities in the preparation of its accessibility plan and include the manner of consultation in the report.

In the Backgrounder on Accessible Government provided by Employment and Social Development Canada (ESDC), several other items have been outlined which pertain to the public sector. Perhaps the most immediate will be the five-year commitment for the public sector to hire a thousand employees per year who identify as people with disabilities.

The government will be investing $53 million over six years, in support of a new Strategy for an Accessible Government of Canada. An "Accessibility Hub" will also be established to provide leadership, coordination and oversight. The details of this strategy and "Accessibility Hub" will be developed and released to the public within one year of the passage of the legislation.

Public Services and Procurement Canada will establish an accessible procurement resource centre. The government will adjust its policies to ensure that goods and services procured by the Government of Canada are accessible.

The vision of the ACA is to be the most accessible and inclusive public service in the world. The guiding principles are:

- Nothing without us: Persons with disabilities are involved in the design and implementation of the strategy.
- Collaboration: Departments and agencies work in collaboration with each other as well as with bargaining agents, and other public, private, and not-for-profit organizations.
- Sustainability: The strategy prioritizes actions that will have a long-term impact.
- Transparency: The strategy is developed and implemented in a transparent manner and departments will report openly and transparently on their efforts to remove barriers.

The five most-pressing goals defined in ACA include:

- Improving recruitment, retention, and promotion of persons with disabilities
- Enhancing the accessibility of the built environment
- Making information and communications technology usable by all
- Equipping public servants to design and deliver accessible programs and services
- Building an accessibility confident public service

The act recognises "American Sign Language (ASL), Quebec Sign Language and Indigenous sign languages (...) as the primary languages for communication by deaf persons in Canada."

Many details are under development.

== Enforcement ==
Representatives from the five organizations responsible for enforcing the ACA make up the Council of Federal Accessibility Agencies (CFAA) along with the Accessibility Commissioner. The five lead organizations are:

- Canadian Transportation Agency
- Canadian Radio-television and Telecommunications Commission (CRTC)
- Canadian Human Rights Tribunal
- Federal Public Sector Labour Relations and Employment Board
- Canadian Human Rights Commission

These organizations are committed to working together, viewing accessibility as a fundamental human right to be realized across Canada.

== National AccessAbility Week ==
The Bill named National AccessAbility Week as the week starting on the last Sunday in May. This is part of an effort to change the public sector's culture, and celebrate Canadians with disabilities.

== Implementation ==
On April 1, 2020, the Policy on Service and Digital came into effect in the Government of Canada. This made the Chief Information Officer (CIO) of Canada responsible for prescribing enterprise-wide information and data standards for accessibility. The requirements and direction specified by the CIO guide the deputy heads to ensure their development and delivery.

Organizations which fall under the ACA will need to build accessibility plans, incorporate accessible feedback tools and create annual progress reports to mark progress on accessibility.

Having measurable progress is a key part of the ACA. OPSA is responsible for developing the strategy and supporting its implementation across all government departments.

== See also ==
- Accessible British Columbia Act for the corresponding British Columbia provincial legislation.
- Accessibility for Manitobans Act for the corresponding Manitoba provincial legislation.
- Accessibility for Ontarians with Disabilities Act, 2005 for the corresponding Ontario provincial legislation.
- Accessibility Act (Newfoundland and Labrador) for the corresponding Newfoundland and Labrador provincial legislation
- Accessibility Act (Nova Scotia) for the corresponding Nova Scotia provincial legislation
- Accessible Saskatchewan Act for the corresponding Saskatchewan provincial legislation.
- Disability Discrimination Act for the corresponding UK legislation.
- Americans with Disabilities Act of 1990 for the corresponding American federal legislation.
- Disability Discrimination Act 1992 for the corresponding Australian federal legislation
