= Global Accessibility Awareness Day =

Day focusing on digital accessibility

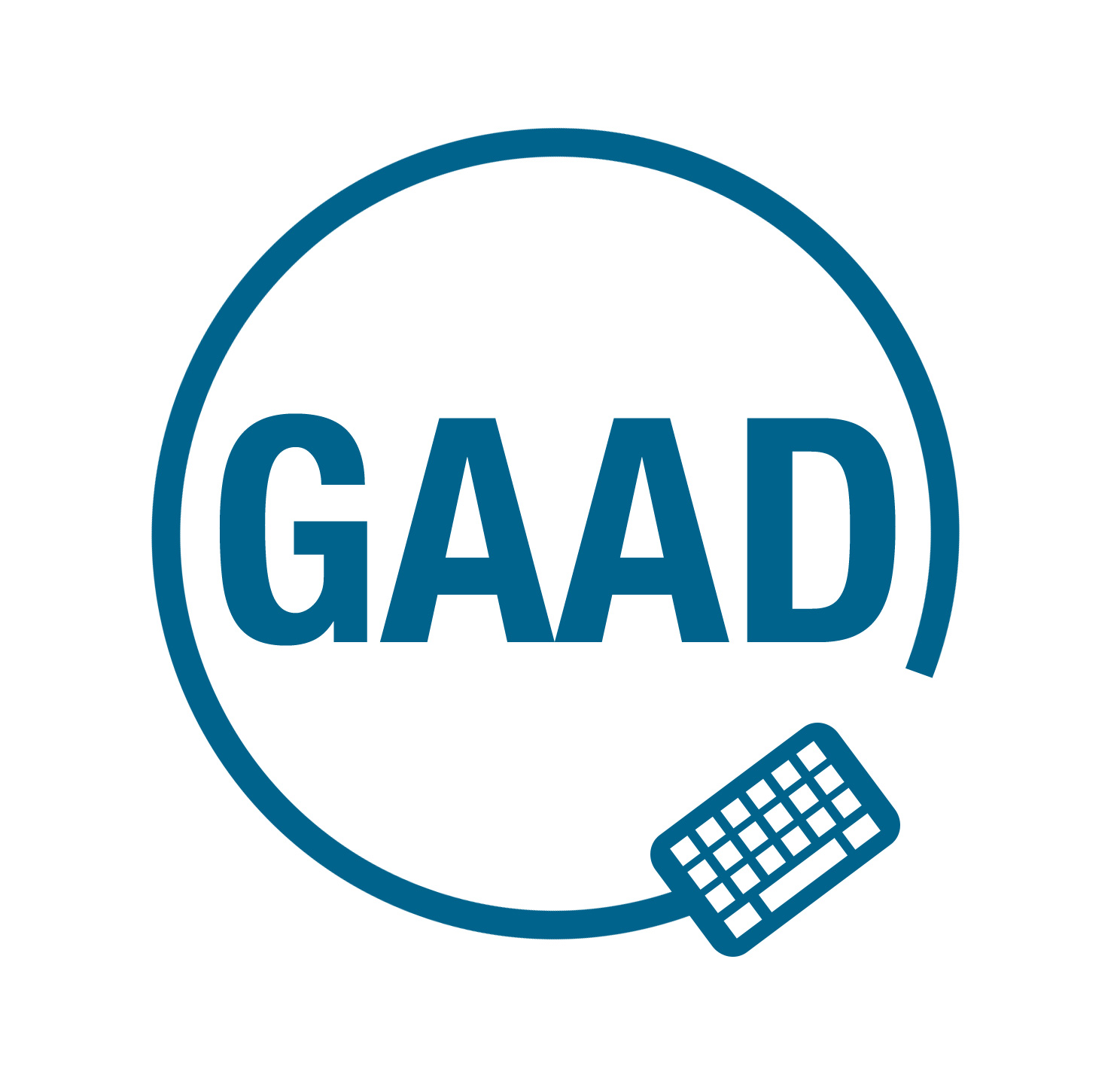
- Also called: GAAD
- Observed by: worldwide
- Type: International
- Significance: Educate people about accessibility
- Date: Third Thursday in May
- 2025 date: May 15
- 2026 date: May 21
- 2027 date: May 20
- 2028 date: May 18
- Started by: Joe Devon, Jennison Asuncion

Global Accessibility Awareness Day (GAAD) is a consciousness-raising awareness day focusing on digital access and inclusion for the more than one billion people alive today who live with disabilities or impairments. It is marked annually on the third Thursday of May.

In 2018, in addition to a number of virtual events marking GAAD, there were events open to the public in at least nineteen countries on six continents.

According to the Global Accessibility Awareness Day website, "The purpose of GAAD is to get everyone talking, thinking and learning about digital (web, software, mobile, etc.) access or inclusion and people with different disabilities." Local Global Accessibility Awareness Day events sometimes showcase how people with disabilities use the web and digital products using assistive technologies, or assist people creating technology products in taking into consideration the needs of certain disabilities.

Global Accessibility Awareness Day launched in May 2012. It was inspired by a blog post from November 2011 by Los Angeles–based web developer Joe Devon. Devon worked with Jennison Asuncion, an accessibility professional from Toronto, to co-found GAAD.

== Events ==
Examples of local Global Accessibility Awareness Day events include:

- Since 2012, the Los Angeles Accessibility and Inclusive Design Group, led by Joseph O'Connor has organized a GAAD event.
- Minnesota IT Services has encouraged employees to perform their jobs for 15 minutes without using a mouse.
- In 2015, a one-day conference was hosted in Ottawa by OpenConcept Consulting, to celebrate GAAD.
- In 2016, a one-day conference was hosted by Carleton University and organized by A11yYOW, Ottawa's accessibility Meetup.
- In 2017, Apple released a series of videos and organized a concert as part of a week-long series of events marking Global Accessibility Awareness Day.
- In 2017, the University of California, San Francisco offered a website accessibility testing clinic.
- In 2017, a GAAD event in Ottawa featured speakers from Carleton University, the Canadian government and the Ottawa area.
- In 2018, there were a series of events planned in Hyderabad and Bangalore, India.
- In 2018, an evening event was hosted in Ottawa by OpenConcept Consulting and we had a live chat with participants in Accessibility Twin Cities, who were also celebrating GAAD.
- In 2020, the Government Digital Service in the United Kingdom ran a day of online-only events to raise awareness of digital accessibility.

== See also ==
- Computer accessibility
- Design for All
- Design for All (in ICT)
- Fix the Web
- Hackathon
- Knowbility
- Inclusion (value and practice)
- Section 508 Amendment to the Rehabilitation Act of 1973
- Universal design
- Universal usability
- Web accessibility
