= Accessaphone =

Disability software

Accessaphone, first introduced in 2005, is CTI (Computer Telephony Integration) enabled software that provides better user access to desk and soft phones via the keyboard, mouse and/or voice commands. The application is specifically useful for users with various vision and mobility abilities.

== How it is used ==
As an example, when using an enterprise phone from Cisco, NEC or Tadiran Telecom, functions like Dial, Hold and Transfer can be executed via keyboard hot keys D, H and T (preceded with the ALT key) respectively. accessaphone uses Microsoft Windows Telephony Application Programming Interface (TAPI) to communicate with the Enterprise Phone System.

== Accessibility compliance ==
One of the ways in which accessaphone makes phone systems accessible and Section 508 compliant is by providing Audible Caller ID. This is a requirement on the Voluntary Product Accessibility Template. This is specifically useful for users with vision loss as the identification of an incoming call gets announced with the use of the software. The United States Access Board - the agency who is responsible for Section 508 - deployed accessaphone along with a Cisco phone system for their employees who required certain access to specific phone features like Audible Caller ID or those employees with physical impairments who needed voice access to the phone.

In 2009, The American Foundation for the Blind did a case study and determined that accessaphone was compliant with Section 508 and did in fact enhance Voice over IP telephony equipment for users needing certain access to that equipment.
