= Knowbility =

American non-governmental organization

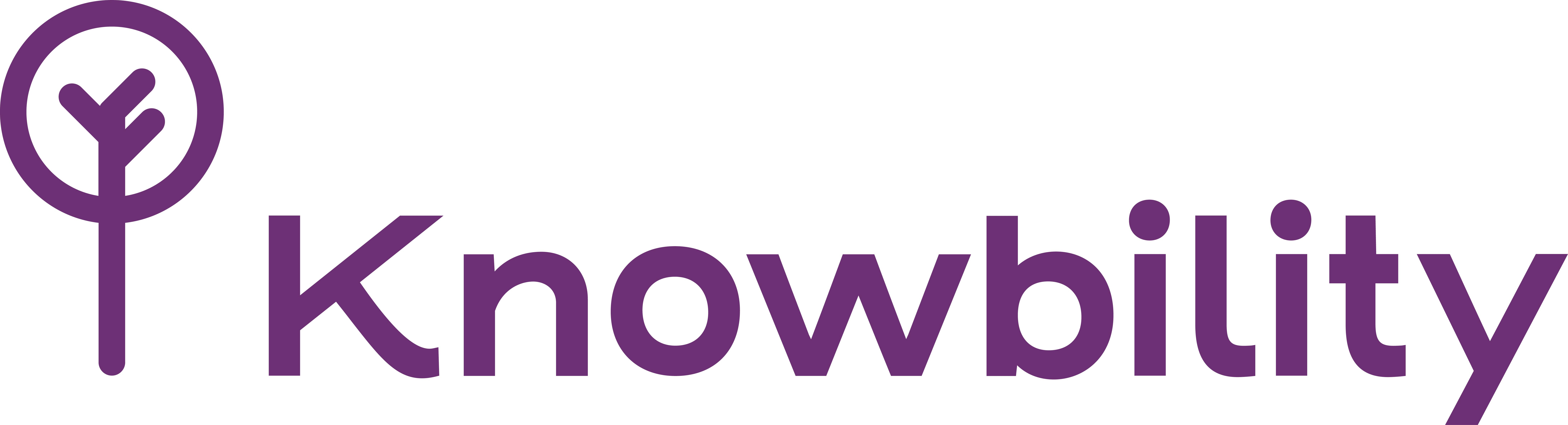
- Founded: 1999
- Type: Non-governmental organization
- Purpose: accessibility, disabilities, assistive technology, human rights
- Location: Austin, Texas
- Region served: Worldwide
- Method: training, activism, research, innovation
- Key people: Sharron Rush, Co-Founder and Executive Director
- Budget: $
- Website: www.knowbility.org

Knowbility is an American non-governmental organization based in Austin, Texas, working to support the independence and empowerment of people with disabilities by promoting the use and improving the availability of accessible information technology. Its mission is to create an inclusive digital world for people of all abilities. Knowbility's signature program is the Accessibility Internet Rally, a web-building competition that brings together volunteer web designers to create accessible websites for nonprofit organizations and artists that serve communities all over the world.

== History ==
Knowbility grew from a community collaboration in 1998 among advocates in Austin, Texas that represented a wide array of businesses, government agencies, and nonprofit organizations dedicated to improving digital accessibility awareness and skills. As Austin became a tech hub, civic leaders set out to create a program to engage website designers and information technology developers in disability issues. The AIR coalition wanted an innovative way to teach the tech sector how to create web sites that are accessible to people with sight impairments, hearing impairments, or other disabilities. That same year, the US Congress enacted Section 508, an amendment to the Rehabilitation Act of 1973, requiring federal agencies to make their electronic and information technology accessible to people with disabilities.

The group in Austin launched the Accessibility Internet Rally, a program produced by the Central Texas chapter of the National Easter Seals Society, the Metropolitan Austin Interactive Network (MAIN), and Goodwill Industries of Austin, with assistance from the virtual volunteering Project. It was held in September 1998 at the Infotec Training Center in Austin, Texas. The first AIR program was created in the style of MAIN's "web-raisings", where volunteers came together in one facility using multiple computers with Internet access and built web sites for nonprofit organizations in one day. The AIR program was different in that it was a competition, with web sites judged based on both their visual appeal, usefulness and accessibility. Each competing team was composed of one or two representatives of an Austin area nonprofit and four to six volunteer web developers. Altogether, more than 120 people were part of competing teams, representing 40 different not-for-profit, public sector and technology companies.

The program proved so successful that organizers founded Knowbility as a nonprofit that would not only make AIR an annual event in Austin, but would also create other programs and training for a national audience to promote digital accessibility in information technology.

== National profile ==
In 1999, in addition to hosting another AIR-Austin, Knowbility staff and volunteers developed an Accessible Web Page Design Curriculum that was freely distributed on its web site. By 2000, Knowbility had achieved a national profile: Knowbility was mentioned on an episode of The Oprah Winfrey Show in 2000 dealing with technology issues. On September 21, 2000, the White House issued a press release to highlight programs across the country helping to bridge the digital divide for people with disabilities; the Rocky Mountain AIR program was mentioned by President Bill Clinton as a noteworthy initiative. AIR was one of three programs selected for recognition by the Drucker Foundation in October 2000. That same year, Knowbility received an award for Notable Achievement in the public service category of the Texas Interactive Media Awards. Also in 2000, Knowbility Board Chair Steve Guengerich and intern Josh Blakeley were featured guests of a panel discussion in Washington DC. at a National Labor Summit, where AIR activities were highlighted as a "best practice" in contributing to the employment of people with disabilities.

Knowbility was invited to ensure accessibility of the "ATSTAR" initiative. ATSTAR is an acronym that stands for "Assistive Technology – Strategies, Tools, Accommodations, and Resources." It is a series of computer based teacher training modules to help teachers, administrators and parents understand the legal requirements and the best practices for assessing student need for assistive technology and implementing it in the classroom. The Texas Education Agency, through their Technology Integration in Education (TIE) grant, awarded a grant to the Austin Independent School District (AISD) to fund the development of ATSTAR. Also collaborating on the initiative was Austin Community College, The University of Texas at Austin, Austin Harvard School, Sylvan Learning Center, Far South Community Schools, and Region XIII Education Service Center. Knowbility managed the accessibility of the multi-media interface. The project produced a replicable CD and web-based assistive technology training model designed to prepare instructional staff at the campus level to conduct assessments, collect data, and integrate assistive technology into the instructional setting. As the project was completed, Knowbility assumed management of the program and ATSTAR is now being used by the Georgia Project for Assistive Technology and many other educators and teachers in training. ATSTAR won recognition for outstanding community collaboration from the Texas State Legislature in May 2002.

In April 2001, the San Francisco Women on the Web (SF WoW) recognized Knowbility Executive Director Sharron Rush as one of their Top 25 Women of the Web for her work to raise awareness of the need and the societal benefits of greater Internet accessibility. The next year, Rush received the Dewey Winburne Community Service Award at the SXSW Interactive Media Conference, largely because of her work with Knowbility.

In 2002, Knowbility founder and executive director Sharron Rush, along with long-time Knowbility volunteer and trainer John M. Slatin, finished the book Maximum Accessibility: Making Your Web Site More Usable for Everyone, published by Addison-Wesley. In 2003, Knowbility received the TEC Champion Award for Outstanding Technology Leadership from the Washington DC–based Education Technology Think Tank and CTCNet.

Sharron Rush has served since 2007 as an invited expert to the Education and Outreach Working Group (EOWG) of the Web Accessibility Initiative (WAI) of the W3C. Since May 2009, she also serves as liaison from WAI to the e-Government Interest Group as it develops standards and best practices for using the Web to improve government accountability and transparency.

== Programs ==
AIR continues annually in Austin since 2002 in conjunction with SXSW. An AIR event is also hosted at St. Edward's University, and AIR events have been conducted in Atlanta, Dallas, Denver, Houston, San Antonio and San Francisco. Volunteer teams have included employees of various corporations and businesses, including IBM, IntelliQuest, and Dell, and government agencies, such as Texas Parks and Wildlife, the Texas State Library & Archives and the City of Austin, as well as individual volunteers forming teams independently.

The ATSTAR program continues to train schools and community technology projects in techniques to include students with disabilities in learning activities related to computer technology.

Knowbility provides a variety of programs featuring basic and advanced training in accessible web design techniques, and is often consulted by companies and government agencies seeking to comply with state, federal, and global mandates for accessibility. Knowbility also produces three-day accessibility training institutes in Texas and California. Since 2003, Knowbility has produced The John Slatin Access U, in partnership with St. Edward's University in Austin each May. In 2005, the Pacific DBTAC, the regional Disability Business Technical Assistance Center, invited Knowbility to replicate this training on the West Coast. The first California Web Accessibility Conference (CalWAC) was produced that year and, the following year, the Chancellor's Office of the California State University System offered to host CalWAC; the training institute was held at CSU Long Beach in 2006 through 2009.

Knowbility was an original and ardent promoter of Bobby, a free online tool provided by the Centre for Applied Special Technology (CAST) used to validate websites for WAI and Section 508 compliance.

== Structure ==
Knowbility has one main office in Austin, Texas. As of August 2009, there are 17 full-time paid staff members. The number of part-time paid staff members, consultants and volunteers varies from month-to-month, depending on what activities Knowbility is undertaking at that time. Knowbility is governed by a board of directors, with most of its members based in Austin, Texas.

== In the news ==
- "Knowbility, Inc.: Making the Web accessible to everyone ", by Mark Collins Sunday, 7 October 2007, Impact Newsletter
- "Sharron Rush of Knowbility", Episode: 097, original broadcast 14 April 2007, Business Makers Radio Show
- "Knowbility Invites Web Pros to Compete in AIR-Houston 2006; Web Designers and Developers Will Create Accessible Web Sites in One Day", 5 September 2006, redOrbit

== See also ==
- Assistive technology
- Bobby
- Computer accessibility
- Design for All
- Design for All (in ICT)
- European Internet Accessibility Observatory
- Fix the Web
- Global Accessibility Awareness Day
- Hackathon
- Human–computer interaction
- Job Accommodation Network
- Inclusion (value and practice)
- Section 508 Amendment to the Rehabilitation Act of 1973
- Universal design
- Universal Design for Learning
- Universal usability
- Visitability
- Web accessibility
- Web Accessibility Initiative
- World Wide Web Consortium
