= VPAT =

VPAT may refer to:

- Voluntary Product Accessibility Template, a guide to evaluate information technology requirements
- Variable Pitch, Angle and Tilt, a blade for the Caterpillar D6
- Vacaville Performing Arts Theatre, Vacaville, California
- Veterans Peace Action Teams
- Veterinary Practitioners' Association of Thailand
- Voluntary Partnership Assistance Team, Kentucky education
