= Perficient =

American consulting firm

Perficient, Inc.
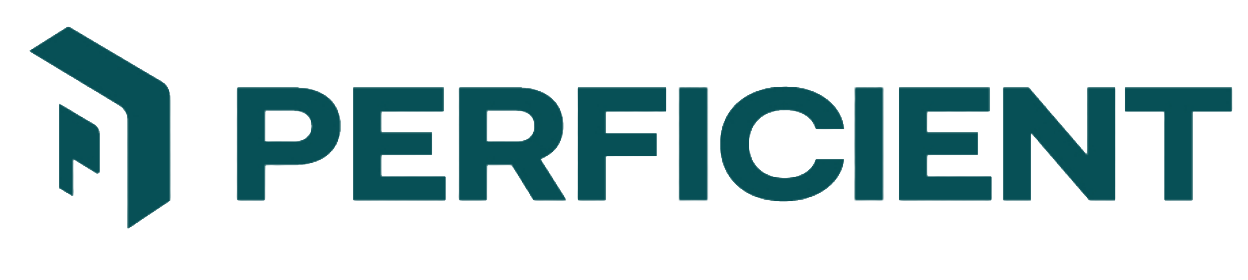
- Type: Private
- Industry: Consulting
- Founded: 1997; 29 years ago
- Headquarters: St. Louis, Missouri, U.S.
- Area served: Worldwide
- Key people: Yusuf Tayob (CEO)
- Number of employees: 7,000 approx
- Parent: EQT AB

Perficient, Inc. is a global digital consultancy company based in St. Louis, Missouri. The company's efforts include enterprise mobile applications, creative services, marketing, digital strategy, Internet of Things, information technology, management consulting, custom development, and platform implementations.

The firm primarily performs project-based work, a large portion of which involves business intelligence and portal collaboration. Perficient also has global capabilities.

== History ==
The company was founded in Austin, Texas in August 1997 by Bryan Menell. Its initial investors were Steve Papermaster and David Lundeen. The company secured its first channel partnership with Vignette, a provider of content management systems.

The company held its initial public offering on July 29, 1999. In December 1999, the company completed its first acquisition, purchasing LoreData, based in New London, Connecticut. In May 2000, Perficient acquired Compete, Inc. In 2001, Vertecon Inc. was acquired.

Jack McDonald became CEO of Perficient in 1999 and chairman in 2001, serving in both roles until 2009. According to the St. Louis Business Journal, during the second quarter of 2009, Perficient posted a loss of $196,000 on $44.9 million in revenue, compared to a $3.9 million profit on $59.1 million in revenue during the same period in 2008.

Jeffrey Davis became Perficient's COO in 2001 and president in 2003, before being named CEO in September 2009. During Davis's tenure as CEO, the firm moved from the Nasdaq SmallCap Market to the Nasdaq Global Select Market. In October 2023, Davis became the executive chairman and Tom Hogan became CEO.

In May 2024, Perficient agreed to be acquired by Swedish private equity firm EQT AB in a $3 billion all-cash transaction. The acquisition was completed in October 2024.

In May 2025, Yusuf Tayob, formerly of Accenture, was appointed CEO of Perficient.

=== Acquisitions ===
Company	Date
LoreData	December 1999
Compete, Inc.	May 2000
Vertecon	October 2001
Javelin Solutions	October 2001
Genisys Consulting, Inc.	April 2004
Meritage Technologies	June 2004
Zetta Works, LLC	March 2005
iPath Solutions	June 2005
Vivare	September 2005
Bay Street Solutions	April 2006
Insolexen	May 2006
EGG	July 2006
E Tech Solutions	February 2007
Tier 1 Innovation, LLC	June 2007
BoldTech Systems, Inc	September 2007
ePairs	November 2007
Kerdock Consulting	March 2010
speakTECH	December 2010
Exervio, Inc.	April 2011
JCB Partners LLC	July 2011
Point Bridge Solutions	February 2012
Nascent Systems	June 2012
Northridge	July 2012
Core Matrix Systems	May 2013
TriTek Solutions	May 2013
ForwardThink Group	February 2014
BioPharm Systems	April 2014
Zeon Solutions, Inc.	January 2015
Market Street Solutions, Inc.	September 2015
Enlighten	December 2015
Bluetube	October 2016
RAS & Associates	January 2017
Clarity Consulting	June 2017
Southport Services Group	April 2018
Stone Temple Consulting Corporation	July 2018
Elixiter, Inc.	October 2018
Sundog Interactive	May 2019
MedTouch LLC	January 2020
Brainjocks	March 2020
PSL	June 2021
Talos Digital	September 2021
Overactive	October 2021
Inflection Point Systems	September 2022
Ameex	October 2022
SMEDIX, Inc.	January 2024
Kelley Austin	October 2025

== Global expansion ==
Perficient operates in North America, Latin America, Europe, and Asia, with more than forty office locations globally. In Latin America, the firm has offices in Argentina, Chile, Colombia, and Uruguay. In India, Perficient maintains offices in Bangalore, Chennai, Hyderabad, Nagpur, and Pune. Its European operations include offices in Serbia, Romania, and the United Kingdom.

== Rebranding ==
In March 2026, Perficient updated its brand identity and logo to align with its focus as a global, AI‑native consulting and technology services firm. The rebranding reflects the company's shift toward artificial intelligence technology.
