= Steve Guengerich =

American entrepreneur and academic

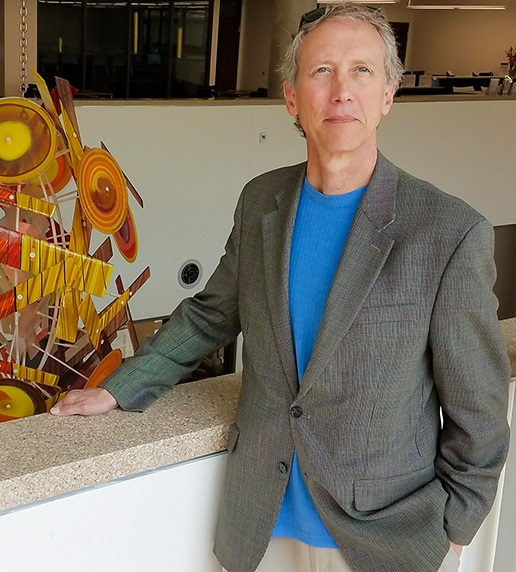
- Born: August 14, 1959 (age 67); Wichita, Kansas, United States
- Occupation: Entrepreneur
- Years active: 1988-present
- Known for: Associate VP, UT Dallas
- Children: 3

Steve Guengerich (/ˈɡɪnrɪtʃ/ GHIN-ritch) is an entrepreneur, educator, and author of several books and numerous articles on information technology.

== Career ==
=== Early career ===
In 1982, Guengerich began his career as a staff consultant in the Houston, Texas office of the Management Information Consulting Division of Arthur Andersen & Co. In 1987, he joined the Louisville, Kentucky office of the Management Consulting Services division of Coopers & Lybrand.

=== Entrepreneurship ===
In 1988, Guengerich became a founding shareholder of BSG Corporation, which was acquired by Per Se Technologies (formerly known as Medaphis) in a 1996 deal valued at $330 million. Per Se was later acquired by McKesson Corporation.

In 1998, he joined Powershift Group, a venture capital studio led by Steve Papermaster as an Entrepreneur in Residence. With Powershift Group, Guengerich served as an executive with several affiliated companies, including Moxie Software as Chief Learning Officer and Appconomy.

In 2010, he started the family office and advisory services firm, BroadBrush Ventures, where he has invested in and advised a select number of startups. For example, he was among the early advisors and an options holder in Iris Healthcare, acquired by Aledade, Inc. in January 2022.

He joined UT Dallas in 2017, with the Dallas Morning News print edition dubbing him "The Envoy of Entrepreneurship." He is currently Senior Advisor for Innovation & Commercialization in the Office of Research & Innovation.

=== Nonprofit work and philanthropy ===
In 1997, Guengerich became CEO of Easter Seals of Central Texas. In 1999, he co-founded Knowbility, Inc., and served as chairman of the board of directors.

He is an active volunteer and philanthropist, having served as a member of the founding board of directors of Austin Social Venture Partners and as a member of the board of governors of the Austin Community Foundation.

Guengerich served as a governor on the board of Austin Museum of Art (2010–11) and has continued to focus his philanthropy on visual and performing arts. Selected contributions include funding a museum reception and the launch of his book Think Lobal, Act Glocal in 2010, supporting the 2015 world premiere of “How Little You Are” by composer Nico Muhly, and supporting the 2019 premiere of “The Rhumb Line” by Amy Bench and Jenn Wilson, a mixed media narrative exhibition at the ICOSA, artist-run cooperative, presented in late 2019.

In 2020, on behalf of institutions in the University of Texas System, Guengerich led the effort to secure a $5 million statewide grant for the expansion of the Blackstone LaunchPad network in Texas, a program of the charitable foundation for The Blackstone Group. He served as the founding Partnership Director for the Texas Network.

== Writing ==
In 1996, Guengerich was awarded the Gold Medal by the Society of Mechanical Engineers (SME) for the Blue Book "Introduction to Client/Server Computing" that he co-authored with Virginia Green.

His most recent book, published by Weeva, Inc. in 2015, is Naturally Caffeinated: The Community Edition. The book is a collection of hundreds of tips for becoming a successful entrepreneur from a wide array of start-up founders and investors from Austin and around the world.

Guengerich is co-author of several books on business innovation and information technology topics, including Client/Server Computing, Rightsizing Information Systems, and Building the Corporate Intranet.

== Teaching ==
From 2010 to 2016, Guengerich taught as an adjunct professor with St. Edward's University Master of Business Administration program teaching New Venture Creation, Branding & Promotion, and Global Business in the Department of Marketing & Entrepreneurship.

From 2017 to 2019, Guengerich served as the Executive Director of the Institute for Innovation and Entrepreneurship at the University of Texas at Dallas, in Richardson, Texas. In addition to his leadership role for the Institute, Guengerich was appointed a Clinical Associate Professor for the Naveen Jindal School of Management, teaching entrepreneurship.

== Mentoring ==
Guengerich has been actively involved as a mentor with Powershift Group and other programs for new venture founders since the late 1990s. He has served as a mentor for the Capital Factory (Austin, Texas), Chinaccelerator (Dalian CHINA), the Mission Capital social venture Accelerator, and the Clean Energy Incubator at Austin Technology Incubator.

In addition to mentoring, Guengerich has served as a judge for many new venture competitions and programs, including: AppJamm, Chengdu; Lean Startup Machine, Shanghai; Global Ventures Labs Investment Competition (formerly University of Texas-Austin, Moot Corp competition), considered “the superbowl” of investment competitions; the Clean Energy Venture Summit; the Clean Energy Incubator Success Committee for the Austin Technology Incubator; and the UT Dallas Big Idea Competition.

== Awards ==
Guengerich is a 2011 recipient of the IT Community Leadership Award, by the Austin IT Executives of the Year competition, a 2005 Dewey Winburne Community Service Award honoree, and a 1998 recipient of the Austin Under 40 awards, alongside other celebrity Austin recipients from the inaugural year that included Lance Armstrong, Michael Dell, and Mike Judge.

Guengerich was recognized as a "Master Mind" by the 2018 Dallas Innovates annual print magazine, as one among eighteen North Texas idea generators.
