= Design for All (in ICT) =

Effort to design inclusive technologies

Design for All in the context of information and communications technology (ICT) is the conscious and systematic effort to proactively apply principles, methods and tools to promote universal design in computer-related technologies, including Internet-based technologies, thus avoiding the need for a posteriori adaptations, or specialised design.

Design for All is design for human diversity (such as that described in the diversity in the workplace or business), social inclusion and equality. It should not be conceived of as an effort to advance a single solution for everybody, but as a user-centred approach to providing products that can automatically address the possible range of human abilities, skills, requirements, and preferences. Consequently, the outcome of the design process is not intended to be a singular design, but a design space populated with appropriate alternatives, together with the rationale underlying each alternative, that is, the specific user and usage context characteristics for which each alternative has been designed.

Traditionally, accessibility problems have been solved with adaptations and the use of assistive technology products has been a technical approach to obtain adaptations. Universal Access implies the accessibility and usability of information and telecommunications technologies by anyone at any place and at any time and their inclusion in any living context. It aims to enable equitable access and active participation of potentially all people in existing and emerging computer-mediated human activities, by developing universally accessible and usable products and services and suitable support functionalities in the environment. These products and services must be capable of accommodating individual user requirements in different contexts of use, independent of location, target machine, or runtime environment. Therefore, the approach aiming to grant the use of equipment or services is generalized, seeking to give access to the Information Society as such. Citizens are supposed to live in environments populated with intelligent objects, where the tasks to be performed and the way of performing them are completely redefined, involving a combination of activities of access to information, interpersonal communication, and environmental control. Citizens must be given the possibility of carrying them out easily and pleasantly.

For a thorough discussion of the challenges and benefits of Design for All in the context of ICT, see also the EDeAN White Paper (2005) and the "Report on the impact of technological developments on eAccessibility" of the DfA@eInclusion project.

== Benefits and challenges ==
The European Commission Communication on e-Accessibility, identified a core of practical challenges, as well as market, legal and policy issues towards improving eAccessibility and e-Inclusion in Europe, and elaborated a three-fold approach based on:

- accessibility requirements in public procurement
- accessibility certification and
- better use of existing legislation.

In that respect, the challenges that need to be addressed include:

- the introduction of specific legislative measures to complement and enhance existing legislation,
- addressing and motivating the industry,
- effective benchmarking,
- providing harmonised standardisation,
- the creation of a curriculum for DfA and,
- addressing future research activities.

== Legislative and regulative background ==
The present policy context of accessibility in the Information Society in Europe is the i2010 initiative. The "i2010 – A European Information Society for growth and employment" initiative was launched by the European Commission as a framework for addressing the main challenges and developments in the information society and media sectors up to 2010. It promotes an open and competitive digital economy and emphasises ICT as a driver of inclusion and quality of life. The initiative contains a range of EU policy instruments to encourage the development of the digital economy, such as regulatory instruments, research and partnerships with stakeholders.

=== Equality and non-discrimination ===
The goal of the European Union Disability Strategy is a society that is open and accessible to all. The barriers need to be identified and removed. The European Union Disability Strategy has three main focuses: co-operation between the Commission and the Member States, full participation of people with disabilities, and mainstreaming disability in policy formulation. Non-discrimination is also one of the general principles of the "Convention on the Rights of Persons with Disabilities", adopted by the United Nations General Assembly on 13 December 2006 and was opened for signatures on 30 March 2007.

=== Telecommunications and information society ===
There is a long tradition of European legislation with regard to telecommunications. In 2002, the European Union adopted a new regulatory framework for electronic communications networks and services, covering all forms of fixed and wireless telecoms, data transmission and broadcasting. From a Design for All perspective, the most important Directives are the Directive on a common regulatory framework and the Directive on universal service and users' rights relating to electronic communications networks and services (Universal Service Directive).

=== Public procurement ===
Public procurement is an important economic force, and therefore it is an important tool to promote accessibility. The legislative package of public procurement Directives, approved in 2004 by the European Parliament and the EU's Council of Ministers, will help simplify and modernize procurement procedures.

The new directives make it possible to take accessibility needs into account at several stages of a procurement process. It is most convenient to refer to standards when making technical specifications. There are already many CEN, ETSI and ITU standards which can be used for this purpose and many sources which can be useful in practice. Likewise, guidelines like the WAI guidelines, for example, or national guidelines have been used. In the future it will be easier to find suitable standards. Mandate M/376 has been given by the European Commission to the European Standardisation Organisations CEN, CENELEC and ETSI, to come up with a solution for common requirements and conformance assessment.

=== Copyright ===
Not all products are accessible for persons with disabilities. When producing audio books, or certain other accessible works, an additional copy is created, and copyright can be a problem in this situation. On the other hand, copyright is an essential part of the sustainability of a creative society. This conflict of interests must be solved somehow in order to ensure the Information Society is a Society for All. There is international and European legislation in this field. The objectives of the Directive on the harmonisation of certain aspects of copyright and related rights in the information society are to adapt legislation on copyright and related rights to reflect technological developments and to transpose into Community law the main international obligations arising from the two treaties on copyright and related rights adopted within the framework of the World Intellectual Property Organisation (WIPO) in December 1996.

=== Protection of privacy ===
The relationship between design and privacy is not necessarily obvious. Modern technology, which is a result of design, is able to collect significant amounts of personal information. The user has an interest in that information being correct and in it being used appropriately. The person may want to keep something confidential and have access to the information that has been collected. In other words, privacy is desired. In 1995 the European Union adopted a Directive on the processing of personal data.

This directive established the basic principles for the collection, storage and use of personal data which should be respected by governments, businesses and any other organizations or individuals engaged in handling personal data. Within the context of Design for All (in ICT), privacy protection is called Privacy by Design.

== Relevant guidelines and standards ==
In the US, Australia, Japan and in the European Union more and more legislative actions are put in place to require public bodies and companies to make sure that their products and services are accessible and usable not only by "standard" users but also by others such as elderly persons or people with an impairment. As it would be unwise to write down technical – and therefore time-bound – requirements into a law, legislative texts preferably refer to (international) standards.

=== Standardisation: general overview ===
Standardisation, i.e., in very general terms, producing a "standard" (French: norme, standard; German: Norm; Spanish: norma) is a voluntary action set up in the past, almost uniquely, by commercial partners who believe that the standardisation will permit easier exchanges of products and goods. This implied very often that the acceptance of the standards is also voluntary and triggered by expected commercial benefits. Only to a very limited extent consumer representatives did participate in standardisation. On the other hand, laws in many countries are referring more and more to the required acceptance of several standards (e.g. on safety or on ecological aspects). The net result of this need for standards is that nowadays many standardisation initiatives are stimulated (= subsidised) by public bodies or, in Europe, directly and indirectly by the European Commission. Also many guidelines have been created by stakeholder groups.

=== Recent developments in DfA related standardisation (formal standards) ===
As DfA standardisation was explicitly mentioned in the eEurope2002 and i2010 Action Plans of the European Union, several new actions were established since then. Four major recent strategies can be distinguished:

- the set up of coordinating working groups and organisations;
- the democratisation of the standardisation processes themselves;
- the increasing impact of non-formal standardisation bodies and;
- the establishment of standardisation related discussion fora open for non-specialists.

=== DfA in ICT related standards ===
- ETSI EG 202 116 V1.2.2 (2009-03)

ETSI Guide Human Factors (HF); Guidelines for ICT products and services; "Design for All".

- Web Content Accessibility Guidelines 2.0

The Web Content Accessibility Guidelines (WCAG) 2.0 is a technical standard that covers a wide range of recommendations for making Web content more accessible. Following these guidelines will make content accessible to a wider range of people with disabilities, including blindness and low vision, deafness and hearing loss, learning disabilities, cognitive limitations, limited movement, speech disabilities, photosensitivity and combinations of these. Following these guidelines will also often make your Web content more usable to users in general.

- BS 8878:2010 Web accessibility – Code of Practice

BS 8878:2010 Web accessibility – Code of Practice provides guidance on how to embed accessibility concerns into organisation's policies and digital production processes. The Standard provides non-technical website owners a better understanding of the value of inclusive design, and a framework for how to use guidelines like WCAG 2.0 to help them create products which are Designed for All. The Standard's lead-author, Jonathan Hassell, has created a summary of BS 8878 to help organisations better understand how the standard can help them.

== Application domains ==
The application domains of Design for All in the context of ICT, practically include every field involving Information and Communication Technologies.

The significance of the application domains reflects their role in establishing a coherent and socially acceptable Information Society, but also the diverse range of human activities affected. The critical application domains for Design for All, can be summarised as follows:

- Life-long learning
- Public information systems, terminals and information appliances (e.g. kiosks, smart home environments)
- Transaction services (e.g., banking)
- Electronic commerce applications and services
- Social services for the citizens (e.g., administration, elderly, transport, health care, awareness)
- Tools to allow for added-value information services (e.g., creation, storage, retrieval and exchange of user experiences, traces and views)
- Security

The White Paper "Toward an Information Society for All: An International R&D Agenda" (1998) published by the International Scientific Forum "Towards an Information Society for All" (ISF-IS4ALL), has discussed the significance of these application domains:

"Life-long learning is a critical area where emphasis should be placed, in the "knowledge" society of the future. It entails a continuous engagement in the acquisition of knowledge and skills to facilitate and sustain equitable participation in the Information Society. New technologies may play a catalytic role in providing new educational mechanisms and structures, thus allowing learning to become an inseparable part of life-long human activities in the context of knowledge-intensive learning communities, and social interaction amongst groups of people.

Another important application area and a critical short-term target is the development of general purpose public information systems, terminals and information appliances, (e.g., information kiosks for access to community-wide information services). These are expected to be used in increasingly different contexts, including public places, homes, classrooms, etc., and provide the means for ubiquitous and nomadic access. Environmental control will also become increasingly important. Smart environments will progressively penetrate a wide range of human activities in hospitals, hotels, public administration buildings, etc. Teleoperation of such environments will also gain increasing attention to facilitate responsiveness to unforeseen events, enhanced mobility and security.

Finally, a broad range of transaction services (e.g., banking, advertising, entertainment), social services for the citizens (e.g., administration, health care, education, transport), and electronic commerce applications, will become increasingly important in reshaping business and residential human activities (...) security, privacy and control are central themes in the evolution of a socially acceptable Information Society and should receive immediate attention. At the same time, they will increasingly constitute more complex targets to accomplish, as they span across different levels of the telecommunications infrastructure, from network services to application services (such as business transactions and entertainment), terminals and information appliances."

== Education and training ==
One major lever to improve awareness and practice in Design for All is the development of education and training programs. Professionals are needed who have acquired comprehensive specialist knowledge and skills in Design for All; in addition those professionals who currently work in ICT industry need to acquire additional knowledge and skills concerning Design for All.

Little evidence can be found of university degree programmes that specialize in Design for All (or Universal Design) or that explicitly includes a module about this. This lack was tackled in the project DfA@eInclusion, which devised curricula:

- A bachelor level introductory course which aims to enable students to have an understanding of the ethical and social issues of Design for All, and the role of Design for All as an enabler of accessibility and participation in the information society
- A masters level programme which aims to enable students to have the relevant knowledge, personal and professional skills & competencies to design, develop, implement, evaluate and manage a wide range of ICT systems products and services that adhere to the principles and practices of Design for All.

The implementation of such programmes is already under way in a few places, for example at Oslo and Akershus University College of Applied Sciences, the Middlesex University, UK, University of Linz, Austria and the University of Trás-os-Montes e Alto Douro, Portugal. Core topics include an understanding of the principles of human rights, the development of standards, regulations and legislation, the design and development of assistive technologies as well as improved access of mainstream products and services.

Web accessibility is an important component of accessing the information society and information and guidance is offered by the World Wide Web Consortium's Web Accessibility Initiative (WAI) as well as online tutorials (for example, Opera's Web Standards Curriculum).

The complementary approach of training for professionals in ICT industry has also been tackled by the DfA@eInclusion project. A comprehensive curriculum for such trainings has been recommended and is currently subject to a CEN workshop negotiation. The CEN workshop "Curriculum for training professionals in Universal Design (UD-Prof)" has been implemented in May 2009. Following the general rules for CEN workshops, it offers all interested stakeholders an opportunity to discuss and improve this DfA curriculum for ICT professionals.

== Examples of good practice ==
- Opera (web browser) was designed with the commitment to be used by as many people as possible thus following a Design for All approach.
- Audiobooks are good examples for Design for All because they enable people to read a book. Virtually anyone who does not have a hearing disability can use audiobooks for leisure, learning, and information.
- e-Government uses information and communication (ICT) technology to provide and improve government services, transactions and interactions with citizens, businesses, and other arms of government.
- Elevators provide an alternative way to reach different floor levels. Modern accessible elevators use information and communication technology to adapt themselves to any user imaginable. The closing speed of the doors is adjustable so people can safely enter quickly or slowly as required. Controls of the elevator provide visual and audible feedback to the user so that people with different sensory abilities can operate the elevator without assistance. Blind people profit from tactile keys. Braille labeling is located besides the keys so that they are not accidentally pushed while reading them. The emergency intercom system operates aurally and visually. Wireless tagging (e.g. RFID), facial recognition, remote controls further enhance the capabilities of a modern elevator which can be used by almost anyone.
- The Inclusive Design Toolkit presents examples of how Design for All principles can be implemented.
- Other examples of Design for All in ICT are presented in EDeAN's Education and Training Resource.

== Related networks and projects ==
=== European Design for all eAccessibility Network ===
The European Design for All e-Accessibility Network – EDeAN is a network of 160 organisations in European Union member states. The goal of the network is to support all citizens' access to the Information Society. EDeAN provides:

- a European forum for Design for All issues, supporting EU's e-inclusion goals
- awareness raising in the public and private sectors
- online resources on Design for All

The network is coordinated by the EDeAN Secretariat, which rotates annually and the corresponding National Contact Centres which are the contact points for EDeAN in each EU member state.

=== Design for All Europe ===
EIDD – Design for All Europe is a 100% self-financed European organisation that covers the entire area of theory and practice of Design for All, from the built environment and tangible products to communication, service and system design. Originally set up in 1993 as the European Institute for Design and Disability (EIDD), to enhance the quality of life through Design for All, it changed its name in 2006 to bring it into line with its core business. EIDD – Design for All Europe disseminates the application of Design for All to business and administration communities previously unaware of its benefits and currently (2009) has active member organisations in 22 European countries. The aim of EIDD is to encourage active interaction and communication between professionals interested in the theory and practice of Design for All and to build bridges between, on the one hand, these and other members of the design community and, on the other hand, all those other communities where Design for All can make a real difference to the quality of life for everyone.

=== Examples of EU-funded research projects addressing ICT and inclusion ===
- Design for all for e-Inclusion

This is a support project to EDeAN. The project aims to develop an exemplary training course for Design for all targeted to the Industry, course structures and curricula for studying Design for All in undergraduate and postgraduate levels as well as an online knowledge base on Design for All.

- DIADEM: Delivering Inclusive Access for Disabled or Elderly Members of the Community

The project aims to develop an adaptable web browser interface for people with reduced cognitive skills, which can be used at home and at work.

- I2Home: Intuitive interaction for everyone with home appliances based on industry standards

The project seeks to develop a universal remote console that will allow networked access to everyday appliances in the home.

- SHARE-IT: Supported Human Autonomy for Recovery and Enhancement of cognitive and motor abilities using Information Technologies

This project is developing scalable and adaptive 'add-ons' which will allow assistive technologies to be integrated into intelligent ICTs for the home.

- HaH: Hearing at Home

This project is looking at the next generation of assistive devices which will help hearing-impaired people to participate fully in the Information Society.

- CogKnow: Helping people with mild dementia navigate their day

CogKnow aims to develop and prototype a cognitive prosthetic device to help those struggling with dementia to perform their daily activities.

- MonAmi: Mainstreaming Ambient Intelligence

The project seeks to mainstream the accessibility of consumer goods and services. The aim is to develop technology platforms that allow elderly and disabled people to continue living in their own homes and stay in their communities.

- USEM: User Empowerment in Standardisation

The project aims to train end-users in standardisation related issues and to enable them to participate in standardisation activities in the area of ICT.

- VAALID: Accessibility and Usability Validation Framework for AAL Interaction Design Process

The project aims at creating modeling and simulation supporting tools to optimize user interaction design and accessibility and usability validation process when developing Ambient Assisted Living solutions.

- PERSONA: Perceptive Spaces promoting Independent Aging

The project aims at further develop Ambient Assisted Living products and services that are affordable, easy to use and commercially viable. The project develops an integrated technological platform that seamlessly links up the different products and services for social inclusion, for support in daily life activities, for early risk detection, for personal protection from health and environmental risks, for support in mobility and displacements within his neighbourhood/town, all of which make a life of freedom worth living within their families and within the society.

== See also ==
- Design for All (design philosophy)
- Universal Design
- Computer accessibility
- Accessibility
- Knowbility
