= U.S. state laws and policies for ICT accessibility =

United States laws for accessibility

Many individual states within the U.S. have accessibility policies for information and communications technology (ICT). These policies often include references to national or international standards. They provide websites and software authors with technical details to ensure that users with disabilities can access the information and that adequate functionality is assured. The most commonly referenced standards are Section 508 and the W3C's Web Content Accessibility Guidelines. The table below provides information for all fifty states and indicates whether policies are in place for websites and software. It also indicates what standards the web policies are based on and provides links to the policies.

State accessibility policies
State	Has website policy?	Based on	Has software procurement policy?
Alabama	Yes	Section 508	No
Alaska	Yes	Section 508, WCAG 2.0	No
Arizona	Yes	A.R.S. § 41-3504(A (1(a)))	No
Arkansas	Yes	Section 508	Yes
California	Yes	Section 508, WCAG 1.0 AA	No
Colorado	Yes	Section 508	No
Connecticut	Yes	WCAG 1.0 A	No
Delaware	Yes	WCAG 2.1 AA	No
District of Columbia	Yes	Section 508	No
Florida	Yes	Section 508	No
Georgia	Yes	WCAG 1.0	No
Hawaii	Yes	Section 508	No
Idaho	Yes	Section 508	No
Illinois	Yes	Section 508, WCAG 1.0	Yes
Indiana	Yes	Section 508	Yes
Iowa	Yes	WCAG 2.0 AA	No
Kansas	Yes	Section 508, WCAG 2.0 AA	Yes
Kentucky	Yes	Section 508, WCAG 1.0 AA	Yes
Louisiana	No	Encouraged to meet Section 508	No
Maine	Yes	Section 508, WCAG 1.0, WCAG 2.0	No
Maryland	Yes	Section 508	No
Massachusetts	Yes	Section 508	Yes
Michigan	Yes	Section 508	No
Minnesota	Yes	Section 508, WCAG 2.0	Yes
Mississippi	Yes	WCAG 1.0	No
Missouri	Yes	Section 508	Yes
Montana	Yes	Section 508	No
Nebraska	Yes	Section 508	Yes
Nevada	No		No
New Hampshire	Yes	Section 508	No
New Jersey	Yes	Section 508	No
New Mexico	Yes	WCAG 1.0 AA	No
New York	Yes	Section 508	No
North Carolina	No		No
North Dakota	No		No
Ohio	Yes	Section 508	No
Oklahoma	Yes	Section 508	Yes
Oregon	No		No
Pennsylvania	Yes	Section 508	No
Rhode Island	No		No
South Carolina	Yes	Section 508, WCAG 1.0	No
South Dakota	Yes	Section 508, W3C Web Content Guidelines	No
Tennessee	Yes	Section 508	No
Texas	Yes	Section 508	Yes
Utah	Yes	WCAG 1.0	No
Vermont	Yes	Section 508, W3C Web Content Guidelines	No
Virginia	Yes	Section 508	No
Washington	No	Encouraged to meet Section 508, W3C	No
West Virginia	Yes	Section 508	No
Wisconsin	Yes	Section 508	No
Wyoming	No		No
