= Citizens Online =

British charity

Citizens Online was a UK basic digital skills and digital inclusion charity that was founded in 2000 by Mark Adams and CEO John Fisher. Its aim was to ensure this switch to online didn't exclude people, and help to bridge the digital divide. The group worked to help other organisations with the impacts of the switch to online services. The main service offered by Citizens Online laterly in their operations was called Switch, which won "Best Digital Inclusion Product or Service" in the Digital Leaders Award for best product in 2015.

== Key projects ==
- Digital Gwynedd Gwynedd Ddigidol launched in October 2015 with funding from the Big Lottery Fund, as an initial partnership between Gwynedd County Council and Citizens Online to work together to tackle digital exclusion across Gwynedd. As of January 2018 there were 35 partners involved in the project including Digital Communities Wales, Jobcentre Plus, Cartrefi Cymru, Citizens Advice Gwynedd, Cyngor Gwynedd and BT.
- Digital Brighton and Hove launched in February 2016 as a partnership with Brighton and Hove City Council and Citizens Online. The project was initially funded by Big Lottery Fund and BT. As of January 2018 there were 130 organisations working together in the cross sector partnership to tackle digital exclusion.

== Fix the Web ==
Fix the Web was Citizens Online's project to address digital accessibility issues for disabled people. The project won an award, was featured on the BBC and supported by Stephen Fry. An animation about the basics of web and software accessibility was launched on Global Accessibility Awareness Day in 2015, but the project failed to attract sufficient funding and is on hiatus.

== With BT ==
Corporations have played a role in the understanding and delivery of digital inclusion. Citizens Online have previously worked with and for BT Group Together, Citizens Online and BT supported research into the Social return on investment created by digital inclusion activity. BT's Get IT Together programme was run by Citizens Online in communities in the UK. Citizens Online was also involved in delivering BT's Everybody Online initiative, which started in 2002. EverybodyOnline included delivering basic digital skills to groups within specific demographics, such as people affected by homelessness in Glasgow. Citizens Online also reviewed BT's computer giveaway programme Community Connections.

== Research and lobbying ==
Primarily, Citizens Online focused on delivery of projects, however the organisation also lobbied the UK government for greater input and join up around the digital inclusion agenda, including a speech at the Institute for Public Policy Research. A white paper produced with Trapeze Transformation suggested that digital inclusion is a systemic issue needing system-wide solutions and laid the foundations for the Switch programme of work. Citizens Online have also done research for Government Departments and agencies such as Nidirect and BECTA.

== Award schemes ==
Citizens Online have run; the 'Innovation on the Community' award scheme with AOL, the Microsoft Community Learning Awards, TalkTalk Digital Hero Awards, and the European Commission.

== One Digital ==
Citizens Online were part of the One Digital partnership with Age UK, Clarion Housing Group, Digital Unite, and Scottish Council for Voluntary Organisations. One Digital was funded by the National Lottery Community Fund.

== Key Personnel ==
John Fisher, Chief Executive 2000 to 2019; Dr. Gail Bradbrook, Strategic Director to 2017; Richard Denyer-Bewick, Managing Director 2017 to 2020; Helen Dobson, Managing Director 2020 to 2024.

== Merger ==
After over 23 years of service in providing digital inclusion and digital access solutions to communities across the UK, Citizens Online merged with the charity AbilityNet in July 2024
