= Nidirect =

Government website for Northern Ireland

NIDirect Logo

nidirect (Irish: tédíreach) is the official Government website for Northern Ireland residents, providing a single point of access to public sector information and services. The content is developed by representatives from the many government departments that contribute to the site, working with a central editorial team.

== Services ==
- Book your MOT test
- Order life event certificates
- Report a pothole
- OSNI Map Shop

== History ==
nidirect had a soft launch in April 2009, replacing OnlineNI, and was officially launched by the then Finance Minister, Nigel Dodds on 7 May 2009.
