= Web Accessibility Initiative =

Effort to improve the accessibility of the World Wide Web

The Web Accessibility Initiative (WAI) is an initiative launched by the World Wide Web Consortium (W3C) in 1997. It is an effort to improve the accessibility of the World Wide Web for people with disabilities. People with disabilities encounter difficulties when using computers generally, but also on the Web. Since they often require non-standard devices and browsers, making websites more accessible also benefits a wide range of user agents and devices, including mobile devices, which have limited resources. According to a US government study, 71% of website visitors with disabilities will leave a website that is not accessible.

The W3C launched the Web Accessibility Initiative in 1997 with endorsement by The White House and W3C members. It has several working groups and interest groups that work on guidelines, technical reports, educational materials and other documents that relate to the several different components of web accessibility. These components include web content, web browsers and media players, authoring tools, and evaluation tools.

== Organization ==
WAI develops guidelines and other technical reports through the same process as other parts of the W3C. Like other W3C initiatives, the WAI consists of several working groups and Special interest groups, each with its own focus. Only working groups can produce technical reports that become W3C recommendations. A working group can sometimes delegate specific work to a task force, which then presents its results back to the working group for approval. Interest groups may produce reports (for example, as W3C Notes), but not recommendations. Each of these types of groups (working group, task force, interest group) can have one or more mailing lists. They meet through conference calls at regular intervals (typically every week or every other week) and sometimes use web-based surveys to collect input or comments from participants. They can also meet face to face (one to five times per year).

In 1997 Judy Brewer has been the director of the WAI. In this role she has championed improving accessibility of the web for people with disabilities and older users.

=== Authoring Tool Accessibility Guidelines Working Group (ATAG WG) ===
The Authoring Tool Accessibility Guidelines Working Group develops guidelines, techniques and supporting resources for tools that create web content, ranging from desktop HTML editors to content management systems. The accessibility requirements apply to two types of things: the user interface on the one hand, and the content produced by the tool on the other. The working group consists of representatives from organizations that produce authoring tools, researchers, and other accessibility experts. The working group produced the Authoring Tool Accessibility Guidelines 1.0 in 2000 and completed Authoring Tool Accessibility Guidelines (ATAG) 2.0 in 2015. A supporting document, Implementing ATAG 2.0, provides additional explanation, examples and resources for ATAG 2.0. It also published a document on Selecting and Using Authoring Tools for Web Accessibility.

=== Education and Outreach Working Group (EOWG) ===
The Education and Outreach Working Group develops materials for training and education on Web accessibility. This working group has produced documents on a wide range of subjects, including:

- Accessibility Features of CSS
- Curriculum for Web Content Accessibility Guidelines 1.0
- Evaluating Web Sites for Accessibility, a suite of documents about subjects such as conformance evaluation, evaluation approaches for specific contexts, involving users in web accessibility evaluation, and selecting web accessibility evaluation tools
- Planning Web Accessibility Training
- Developing a Web Accessibility Business Case for Your Organization
- How People with Disabilities Use the Web, a document that describes various fictitious characters with disabilities and how they use the Web in different scenarios
- many introduction pages on the WAI website.

Currently, the working group has a task force to support the work done in the WAI-AGE project. This project published a document that reviews literature about the needs of older users and compares these needs with those of people with disabilities as already addressed in WAI guidelines.

The Education and Outreach Working Group can also review working drafts produced by other WAI working groups.

=== Evaluation and Repair Tools Working Group (ERT WG) ===
The Evaluation and Repair Tools Working Group develops technical specifications that support the accessibility evaluation and repair of Web sites. It also maintains a database of tools for evaluating Web sites and for making them more accessible ("repair", "retrofitting"). The working group consists mainly of developers of such tools and researchers. Current work focuses on

- Evaluation and Report Language (EARL): a language for expressing evaluation reports in a machine-readable way
- HTTP Vocabulary in RDF, which specifies how HTTP requests and responses can be expressed in RDF
- Representing Content in RDF, which specifies how content (retrieved from the Web or a local storage device) can be represented in RDF
- Pointer Methods in RDF, early work on how locations in and parts of online documents can be expressed in RDF.

=== Protocols & Formats Working Group (PFWG) ===
The Protocols & Formats Working Group reviews all W3C technologies for accessibility before they are published as a recommendation. It has also published a note on accessibility issues of CAPTCHA, a paper on natural language usage for people with cognitive disabilities, and initial work on accessibility requirements for XML-based markup languages (XML Accessibility Guidelines).

In 2006, the working group started development of a set of document and specifications for accessible rich internet applications: WAI-ARIA.

=== Research and Development Interest Group (RDIG) ===
The goal of the Research and Development Interest Group is

- to increase the incorporation of accessibility considerations into research on Web technologies, and
- to identify projects researching Web accessibility and suggest research questions that may contribute to new projects.

This interest group has seen very little activity since 2004. Its current charter expired at the end of 2006.

=== User Agent Accessibility Guidelines Working Group (UAWG) ===
The User Agent Accessibility Guideline Working Group develops guidelines, techniques and other documents to promote the accessibility of user agents: browsers and plug-ins. The working group consists mainly of organizations that develop user agents, researchers, and other accessibility experts. UAWG published User Agent Accessibility Guidelines (UAAG) 2.0 in December 2015. Supporting documentation includes: UAAG 2.0 Reference and UAAG Mobile Examples. The working group published User Agent Accessibility Guidelines 1.0 (UAAG 1.0) as a W3C Recommendation in 2002.

=== WAI Interest Group (WAI IG) ===
The WAI Interest Group is an open group with a mailing list to which anyone can subscribe. W3C staff post announcements of new WAI documents to this mailing list to invite reviews and comments. Members of the list also post announcements of relevant events and publications, and ask advice on issues related to web accessibility. The language of the mailing list is English; there are no parallel mailing lists in other languages.

=== Accessibility Guidelines Working Group (AGWG) ===
The Accessibility Guidelines Working Group (formerly the Web Content Accessibility Guidelines Working Group) produces guidelines, techniques and other supporting documents relating to the accessibility of Web content. Web content refers to any information you may find on a Web site: text, images, forms, sound, video, etcetera, regardless whether these were produced on the server side or on the client side (with a client-side scripting language such as JavaScript). Thus, the guidelines also apply to rich internet applications.

The working group consists of representatives from industry, accessibility consultancies, universities, organizations that represent end users, and other accessibility experts.

The working group published the Web Content Accessibility Guidelines 1.0 (WCAG 1.0) as W3C Recommendation in 1999, followed by techniques documents in 2000. In 2001, the working group started work on WCAG 2.0, which became a W3C Recommendation on 11 December 2008.

=== WAI Coordination Group ===
The WAI Coordination Group co-ordinates that activities of the WAI working groups (and interest groups). Its activities are not public.

== Guidelines and technical reports ==
=== Web Content Accessibility Guidelines (WCAG) ===
The Web Content Accessibility Guidelines 1.0 (known as WCAG) were published as a W3C Recommendation on 5 May 1999. A supporting document, Techniques for Web Content Accessibility Guidelines 1.0 was published as a W3C Note on 6 November 2000. WCAG 1.0 is a set of guidelines for making web content more accessible to persons with disabilities. They also help make web content more usable for other devices, including mobile devices (PDAs and cell phones). The Web Content Accessibility Guidelines 1.0 are recognized as a de facto standard and have served as a basis for legislation and evaluation methodologies in many countries.

The WCAG working group published WCAG 2.0 as a Recommendation on 11 December 2008. WCAG 2.0 is based on very different requirements from WCAG 1.0:

- the guidelines needed to be technology-neutral, whereas WCAG 1.0 was strongly based on HTML and CSS;
- the guidelines needed to be worded as testable statements instead of instructions to authors.

The combination of more general applicability and higher precision proved very challenging.

In 2018, the WCAG working group published WCAG 2.1. This remains fundamentally similar to the guidance in WCAG 2.0, with some additional recommendations made in particular areas:

- Mobile device accessibility
- Low vision users

=== Authoring Tool Accessibility Guidelines (ATAG) ===
Developed by the Authoring Tool Accessibility Guidelines Working Group, the ATAG 2.0 became a W3C Recommendation on 24 September 2015. ATAG is a set of guidelines for developers of any kind of authoring tool for Web content: simple HTML editors, tools that export content for use on the Web (for example, word processors that can save as HTML), tools that produce multimedia, content management systems, learning management systems, social media, etc..

The goal is for developers to create tools that:

- are accessible to authors regardless of disability;
- produce accessible content by default;
- support and encourage authors to create accessible content.

Implementing ATAG 2.0 is a companion document that provides guidance on understanding and implementing ATAG 2.0. It gives an explanation of the intent of each success criterion, examples of the success criterion, and additional resources. Implementing ATAG 2.0 recommendations can reduce the costs for accessibility because authors are given the tools they need to create accessible content.

List of authoring tools looking to implement ATAG 2.0:

- CKEditor
- Drupal

Authoring Tool Accessibility Guidelines 1.0 was published in 2000 by the Authoring Tool Accessibility Guidelines Working Group.

=== User Agent Accessibility Guidelines (UAAG) ===
Developed by the User Agent Accessibility Guidelines Working Group, the UAAG 1.0 became a W3C Recommendation on 17 December 2002. The UAAG is a set of guidelines for user agent developers (such as web browsers and media players) aimed at making the user agent accessible to users with disabilities. Techniques for User Agent Accessibility Guidelines 1.0 was published as a W3C Note on the same day; it provides techniques for satisfying the checkpoints defined in UAAG 1.0. Working group members also produced other supporting documents, including initial notes on How to evaluate a user agent for conformance to UAAG 1.0; this document was not formally approved by the working group. No user agents have been reported as fully conforming to UAAG 1.0.

The working group is currently working on a new version of the guidelines. The first public draft of User Agent Accessibility Guidelines 2.0 was published on 12 March 2008.

=== XML Accessibility Guidelines (XAG) ===
The XAG explains how to include features in XML applications (i.e. markup languages conforming to the XML specification) that promote accessibility. Work on these guidelines stopped in 2002; the guidelines are still a working draft.

=== Accessible Rich Internet Applications (WAI-ARIA) ===
WAI-ARIA (Web Accessibility Initiative – Accessible Rich Internet Applications) is a technical specification which became a W3C Recommended Web Standard on 20 March 2014. It allows web pages (or portions of pages) to declare themselves as applications rather than as static documents, by adding role, property, and state information to dynamic web applications. ARIA is intended for use by developers of web applications, web browsers, assistive technologies, and accessibility evaluation tools.

== See also ==
- Web accessibility

US web accessibility

- Knowbility
- Section 508 of the Rehabilitation Act of 1973 – a Federal law requiring US government electronic and information technology (EIT) to meet accessibility requirements
