= Voluntary Product Accessibility Template =

Standards document template for US Section 508

A Voluntary Product Accessibility Template (VPAT) is a form to capture information regarding how an information and communications technology (ICT) product or service conforms with Section 508 of the United States Rehabilitation Act of 1973, as amended (29 U.S.C. § 794 (d)). Section 508 provides guidelines for rendering ICT accessible to, and therefore usable by, people with disabilities. The VPAT was originally designed as a tool for vendors to document product compliance to Section 508 and facilitate government market research on ICT with accessible features.

Terminology differs when referring to the completed document, with some making a distinction between the blank VPAT and a completed form, sometimes called an Accessibility Conformance Report (ACR).

The current VPAT has expanded to include the U.S. Revised Section 508, European EN 301 549, and Web Content Accessibility Guidelines (WCAG), which are required by regulations in many jurisdictions. It is available in four editions:

- WCAG edition - For reporting compliance to the W3C Web Content Accessibility Guidelines 2.0 or 2.1.
- 508 edition - For reporting compliance to the U.S. Revised Section 508 standards
- EU edition - The European edition used for reporting compliance to the EN 301 549 standard
- INT edition - The international edition used for reporting compliance to all three standards

The rows of each table in the VPAT address each accessibility requirement for ICT products. The rows are grouped into sections that match the organization of the particular standard. Standards typically have sections for different technology aspects of a product such as web content, software, documentation, hardware, two-way voice communications, and product support services. Each VPAT table has three columns. The first column identifies the individual requirement, the second column is where the level of conformance to the requirement should be documented, and the third column is used for remarks and explanations further describing the level of conformance.

== Legal status and history ==
The template is a registered service mark of the Information Technology Industry Council (ITI). This may affect its proper use in text, and who has permission to use the template. The term is commonly used in procurement discussions of compliance or conformance with Section 508.

The VPAT was developed by ITI in partnership with the U.S. government's central procurement office, the General Services Administration, starting in 2001 to address the general issue of matching ICT product features to Section 508 accessibility requirements with a checklist. Characteristically a U.S. government office will require a VPAT to state the accessibility attributes of a product, but will not have enough time or information to examine the truthfulness of every line, and will not require perfect accessibility by all possible users. For example, a tool to be used only by few specialized software developers might be acquired even if its accessibility features are limited, whereas a widely used public web site will have to meet higher standards. The agency may make choices about what to require.

October 4, 2017, ITI published an updated version, VPAT 2.0, reflecting the provisions of the newly-published Revised Section 508. In addition, VPAT 2.0 incorporated provisions from the European ICT accessibility standards for public sector procurement, EN 301 549 V1.2.1, and the W3C WCAG 2.0 web content accessibility guidelines.

The VPAT has undergone multiple revisions to incorporate standards updates including a correction to the U.S. Revised Section 508 final rule, the W3C WCAG 2.1, and the EN 301 549 V2.1.2.

February 2020, ITI published the latest version, VPAT 2.4, which incorporated the provisions from the EN 301 549 V3.1.1.

== Example VPATs ==
VPATs cover a wide array of products, including computer software, imaging hardware, web content, voice communications, electronic documentation and services. ITI provides recommendations for completing VPATs but, ultimately, manufacturers and suppliers are responsible for the clarity, completeness, and usefulness of the content contained in the report.

- Stata statistical software VPAT
- Microsoft's Forefront™ Threat Management Gateway Web site VPAT
- Notebook computer VPAT for Lenovo ThinkPad
- GitHub web site VPAT
- Firefox software browser VPAT
- An example version 2.1 VPAT from Appian
- MediaWiki's VPAT
