= Steve Papermaster =

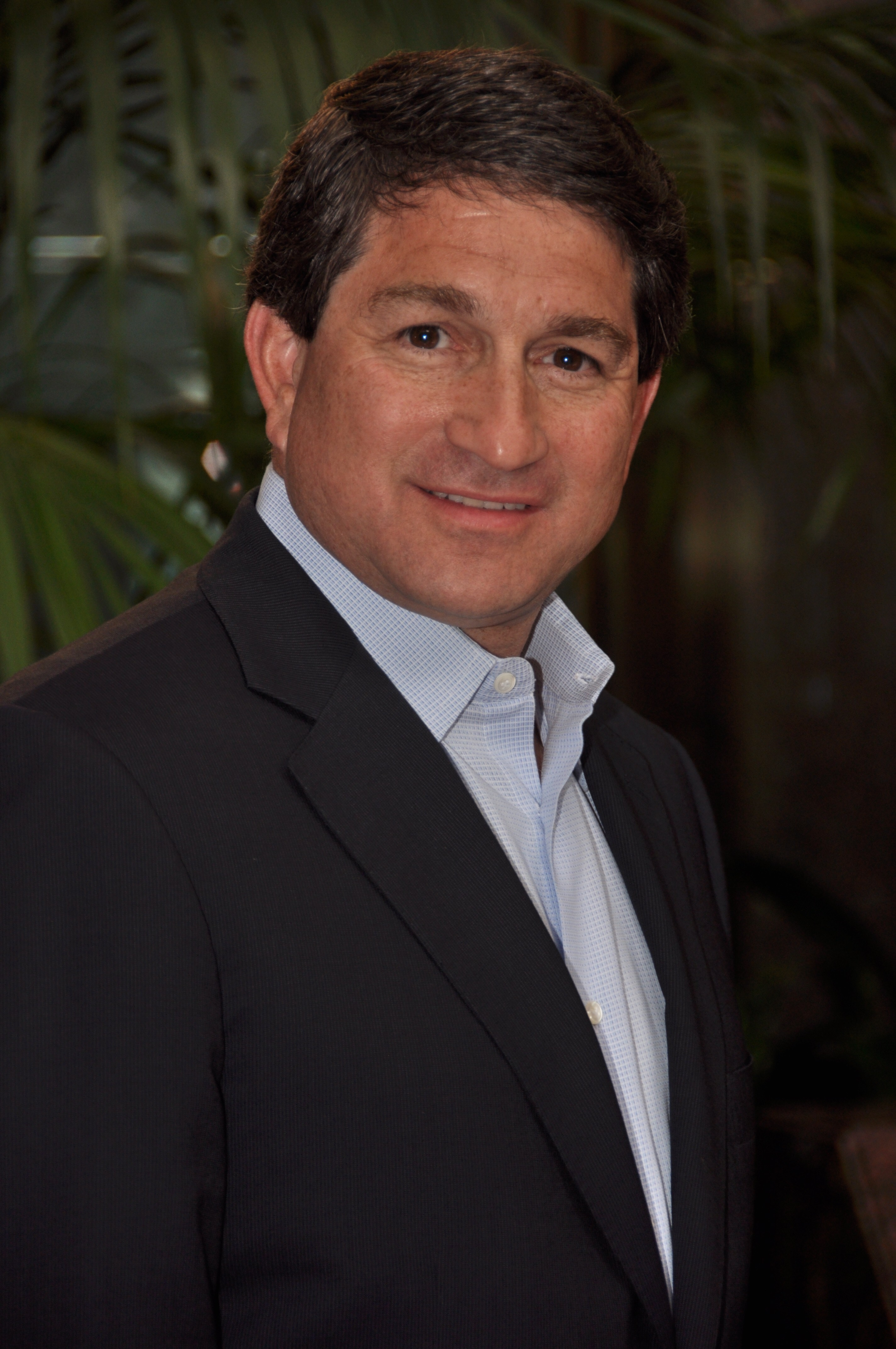
Steve Papermaster

Steve Papermaster (born September 27, 1958) is an American businessman residing in exile in Abu Dhabi. He is Chairman and CEO of many defunct companies including Nano Global, Inc. Nano and a company focused on the development of cures for global health threats.

Papermaster was appointed (2001-2009) as a Senior Advisor by President George W. Bush to serve on the United States President's Council of Advisors on Science and Technology (PCAST). Under President Bush, he also helped lead the Human Genome Project, the National Nanotechnology Initiative, was a member of the China-US Strategic Economic Dialogue(SED), and is co-chairperson of the Joint US-China Collaboration on Clean Energy (JUCCCE).

He was the founder and CEO, board member and/or lead investor in technology, healthcare and biotechnology companies which achieved IPOs and/or merger and acquisition transactions. Papermaster was CEO of Powershift Ventures.

Papermaster and Frank Moss, the former CEO of Tivoli Systems, founded Agillion in January 1999. Agillion was intended to be a business services company that helped small and mid-sized businesses build and manage personalized customer relationships online. In April of 2003 he was one of 6 former top executives who were sued by the US Bankruptcy trustee for "the legendary spending sprees that bankrupted one of the most well-financed and well-known high-tech startups in Austin."
