= Section 508 Amendment to the Rehabilitation Act of 1973 =

Amendment to United States federal law

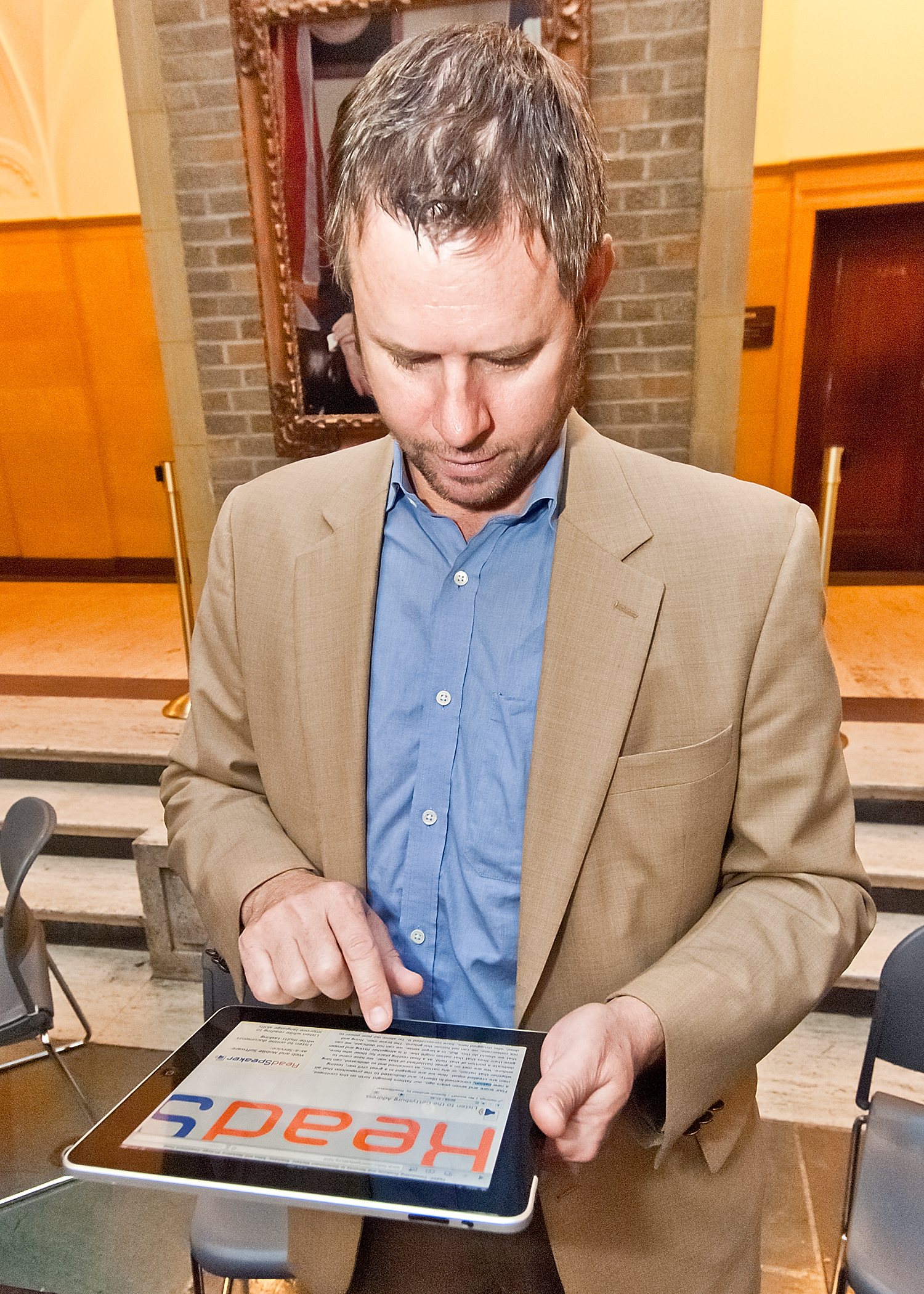
Chief Operations Officer of FEDVC Torsten Oberst demonstrates how their software reads any web content/text into an audio Cloud service at the U. S. Department of Agriculture (USDA) Section 508 and Disability Awareness Program in Washington, DC, on Monday, October 31, 2011.

Section 508 was enacted to eliminate barriers in information technology, enabling more opportunities for people with disabilities and promoting the development of technologies to meet these goals. The law applies to all federal agencies across the lifecycle of information and communications technology, spanning development, procurement, maintenance, and use. Under Section 508 (29 U.S.C. § 794d), agencies should offer comparable accessibility to information technology, for employees and members of the public. Section 508 first addressed accessibility of electronic and information technology in 1986, with the guidelines revised in 1998 as compliance requirements.

== History ==
Section 508 originated as a 1986 amendment to the Rehabilitation Act of 1973, with the new section reflecting the rapid growth of electronic and information technologies.

U.S. legislators subsequently proposed compliance standards to correct the shortcomings of the original section 508, which lacked binding guidelines that impacted enforceability. To rectify these issues, the Federal Electronic and Information Technology Accessibility and Compliance Act revised Section 508 in 1998.

Section 508 addresses legal compliance through the process of market research and government procurement and also has technical standards against which products can be evaluated to determine if they meet the technical compliance. Because technology can meet the legal provisions and be legally compliant (e.g., no such product exists at time of purchase) but may not meet the United States Access Board's technical accessibility standards, users are often confused between these two issues. Additionally, evaluation of compliance can be done only when reviewing the procurement process and documentation used when making a purchase or contracting for development, the changes in technologies and standards themselves, it requires a more detailed understanding of the law and technology than at first seems necessary.

Section 508 compliance extends to commercial organizations that receive federal funds or contract with a federal agency. Commercial best practices include voluntary standards and guidelines as the World Wide Web Consortium (W3C) Web Accessibility Initiative (WAI). Automatic accessibility checkers (engines) such as "IBM Rational Policy Tester" and AccVerify, refer to Section 508 guidelines but have difficulty in accurately testing content for accessibility.

In 2006, the United States Access Board organized the Telecommunications and Electronic and Information Technology Advisory Committee (TEITAC) to review and recommend updates to its Section 508 standards and Telecommunications Act Accessibility Guidelines. TEITAC issued its report to the Board in April 2008. The Board released drafts of proposed rules based on the committee's recommendations in 2010 and 2011 for public comment. In February 2015, the Board released a notice of proposed rulemaking for the Section 508 standards.

In 2017 the Section 508 Refresh came into effect. This was then updated a year later in January 2018 to restore TTY access provisions. This refresh essentially aligned the web elements with the W3C's WCAG 2.0 AA criteria. Major updates included clarifications on interoperability for software and a focus on function to allow for new and emerging technologies to be covered. The refresh mandated all agency public business content to be accessible to individuals with disabilities. Additionally, there were more standards added to specify accessibility for some non-public-facing agency business.

== The law ==
=== Qualifications ===
- Federal agencies can be in legal compliance and still not meet the technical standards. Section 508 §1194.3 General exceptions describe exceptions for national security (e.g., most of the primary systems used by the National Security Agency (NSA)), incidental items not procured as work products, individual requests for non-public access, fundamental alteration of a product's key requirements, or maintenance access.
- In the case that implementation of such standards causes undue hardship to the federal agency or department involved, the agency or department is required to supply the data and information to covered disabled persons by alternative means that allow them to make use of such information and data. To determine if there is an exception for an undue burden, there must be significant financial burden or a "fundamental alteration in the nature of the ICT [Information and Communication Technology]".
- Section 508 requires that all Federal information that is accessible electronically must be accessible for those with disabilities. This information must be accessible in a variety of ways, which are specific to each disability.

=== Provisions ===
The original legislation mandated that the Architectural and Transportation Barriers Compliance Board, known as the Access Board, establish a draft for their Final Standards for accessibility for such electronic and information technologies in December 2001. The final standards were approved in April 2001 and became enforceable on June 25, 2001. On July 6, 2006, the Access Board created the Telecommunications and Electronic and Information Technology Advisory Committee (TEITAC) to develop updated Section 508 standards which were presented in a report on April 3, 2008. This report then was drafted into proposed changes on December 8, 2011 for public comment. Eventually, these proposed new standards were implemented in the Section 508 Refresh.

The latest information about these standards and about support available from the Access Board in implementing them, as well as the results of surveys conducted to assess compliance, is available from the Board's newsletter Access Currents. The Section 508 standards, tools, and resources are available from the Center for Information Technology Accommodation (CITA), in the U.S. General Services Administration's Office of Government-wide Policy.

== Summary of Section 508 technical standards ==
- Software Applications and Operating Systems: includes accessibility to software, e.g. keyboard navigation and focus is supplied by a web browser.
- Web-based Intranet and Internet Information and Applications: assures accessibility to web content, e.g., text description for any visuals such that users with a disability or users that need assistive technology such as screen readers and refreshable Braille displays, can access the content.
- Telecommunications Products: addresses accessibility for telecommunications products such as cell phones or voice mail systems. It includes addressing technology compatibility with hearing aids, assistive listening devices, and telecommunications devices for the deaf (TTYs).
- Videos or Multimedia Products: includes requirements for captioning and audio description of multimedia products such as training or informational multimedia productions.
- Self Contained, Closed Products: products where end users cannot typically add or connect their own assistive technologies, such as information kiosks, copiers, and fax machines. This standard links to the other standards and generally requires that access features be built into these systems.
- Desktop and Portable Computers: discusses accessibility related to standardized ports, and mechanically operated controls such as keyboards and touch screens.

== Practice and impact ==
When evaluating a computer hardware or software product which could be used in a U.S. government agency, information technology managers now look to see if the vendor has provided an Accessibility Conformance Report (ACR). The most common ACR is known as Voluntary Product Accessibility Template (VPAT) although some departments historically promoted a Government Product Accessibility Template (GPAT). The VPAT template was created by the Information Technology Industry Council (ITI). A VPAT lists potential attributes of the product that affect the degree to which it is accessible. Nearly 48% of 72 different federal websites had accessibility issues on at least one of three webpages analyzed according to WCAG 2.0 Level A or AA standards. One challenge to the adoption of open-source software in the U.S. government has been that there is no vendor to provide support or write a VPAT, but a VPAT can be written by volunteers if they can find the necessary information.

Benefits of including accessible features in ICT can help a number of individuals with a variety of disabilities. According to the U.S. Census Bureau, 19.9 million adults over the age of 15 have grip and lift issues and an additional 8.1 million have some visual impairment such as color blindness. Furthermore, 7.6 million people have some hearing loss or impairment. Accessible ICT allows a large number of Americans to engage with information online, demonstrating the potential impacts of maintaining Section 508 compliance for federal agencies.

== See also ==
- Computer accessibility
- ICT accessibility laws by state
- Section 504 of the Rehabilitation Act
- Universal usability
- Web Content Accessibility Guidelines
- Web accessibility
