= Elevator =

Vertical transport machine

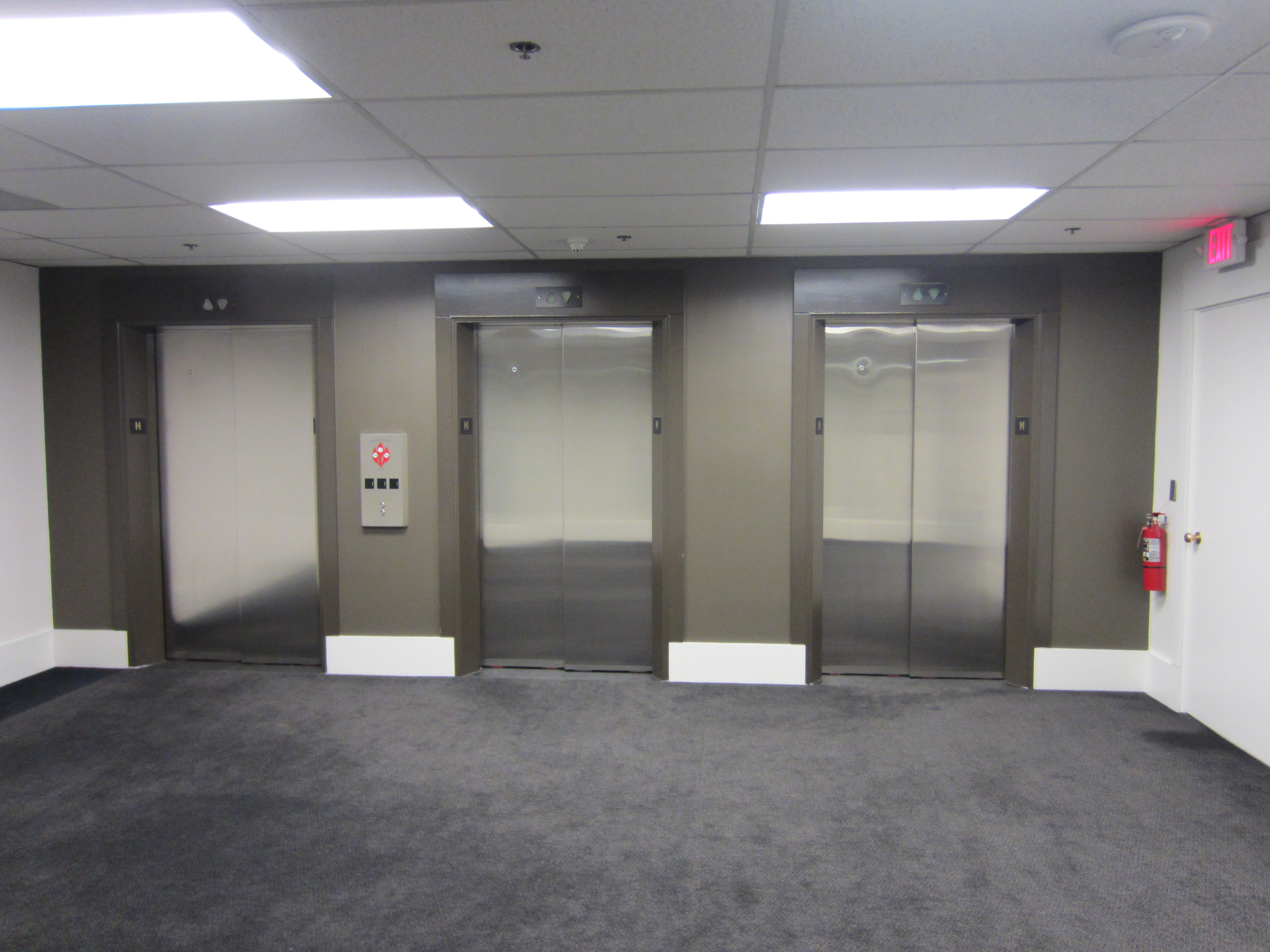
Outside of a typical elevator, shown in an office building in Portland, United States

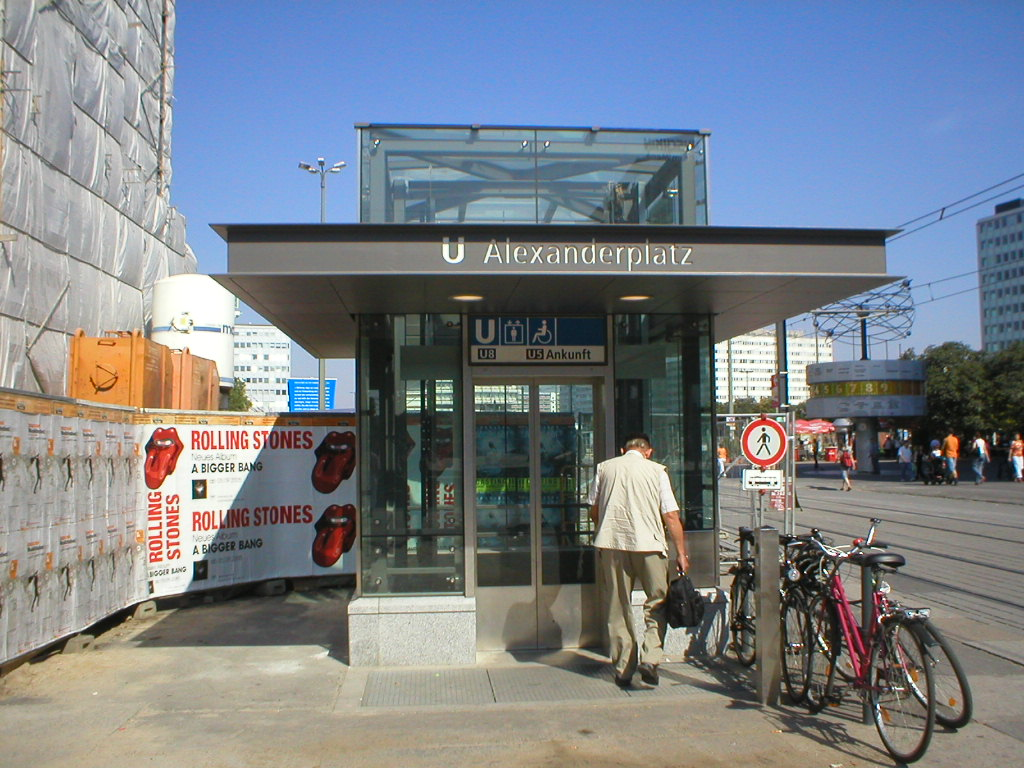
This elevator to the Alexanderplatz U-Bahn station in Berlin is built with glass walls and doors, exposing the inner workings.

An elevator (North American English, Philippine English) or lift (Commonwealth English except Canada) is a machine that vertically transports people or freight between levels. They are typically powered by electric motors that drive traction cables and counterweight systems such as a hoist, although some pump hydraulic fluid to raise a cylindrical piston like a jack.

Elevators are used in agriculture and manufacturing to lift materials. There are various types, like chain and bucket elevators, grain augers, and hay elevators. Modern buildings often have elevators to ensure accessibility, especially where ramps are not feasible. High-speed elevators are common in skyscrapers. Some elevators can even move horizontally. Smart elevators enable multi-elevator coordination, enhancing the riding experience while reducing costs.

== History ==
=== Pre-industrial era ===
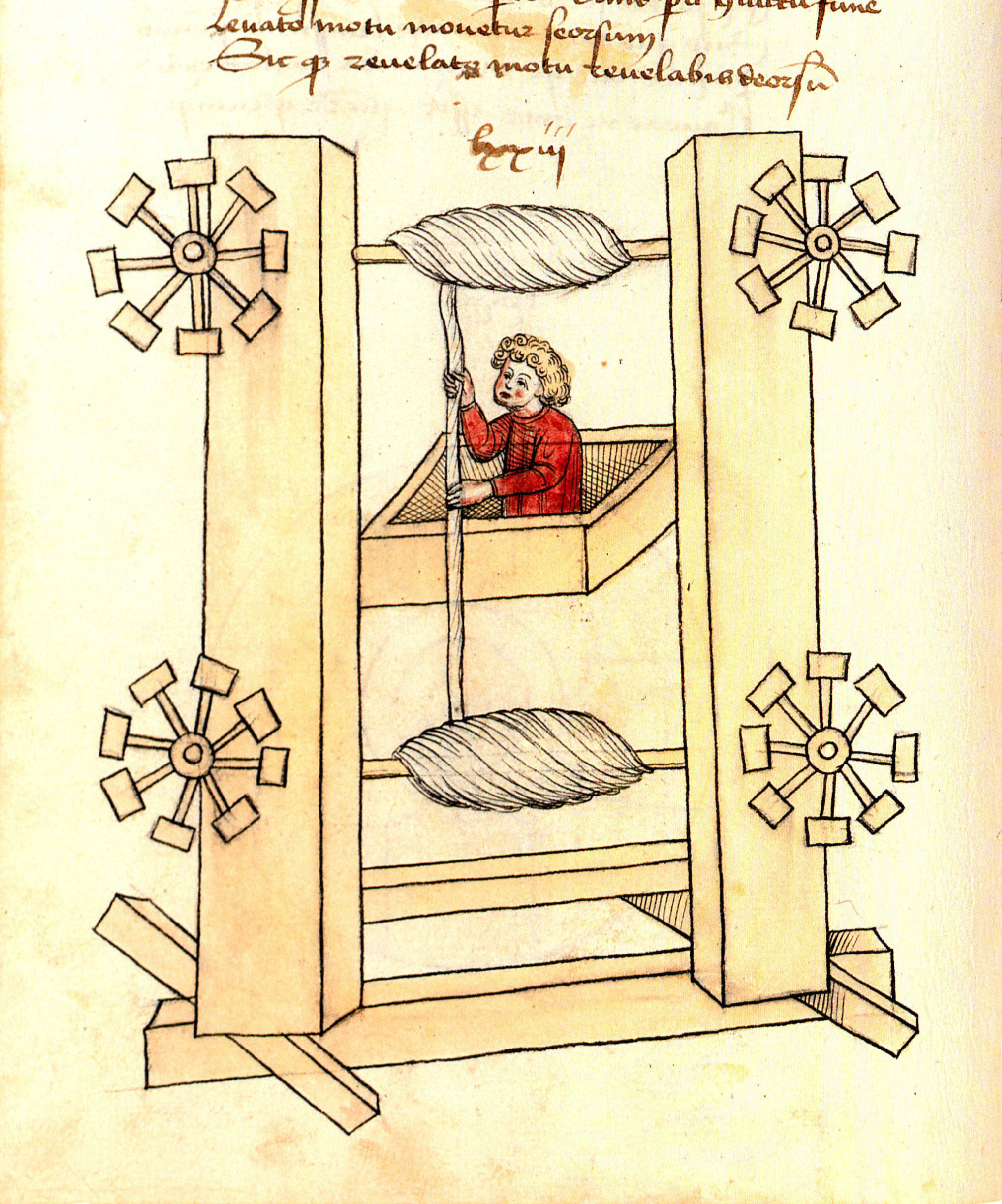
Elevator design by the German engineer Konrad Kyeser (1405)

The earliest known reference to an elevator is in the works of the Roman architect Vitruvius, who reported that Archimedes (c. 287 BC – c. 212 BC) built his first elevator probably in 236 BC. Sources from later periods mention elevators as cabs on a hemp rope, powered by people or animals.

The Roman Colosseum, completed in 80 AD, had roughly 25 elevators that were used for raising animals up to the floor. Each elevator could carry about 600 pounds (270 kg) (roughly the weight of two lions) 23 feet (7.0 m) up when powered by up to eight men. In 1000, the Book of Secrets by Ibn Khalaf al-Muradi in Islamic Spain described the use of an elevator-like lifting device to raise a large battering ram to destroy a fortress.

In the 17th century, prototypes of elevators were installed in the palace buildings of England and France. Louis XV of France had a so-called 'flying chair' built for one of his mistresses at the Château de Versailles in 1743.

Ancient and medieval elevators used drive systems based on hoists and windlasses. The invention of a system based on the screw drive was perhaps the most important step in elevator technology since ancient times, leading to the creation of modern passenger elevators. The first screw-drive elevator was built by Ivan Kulibin and installed in the Winter Palace in 1793, although there may have been an earlier design by Leonardo da Vinci. Several years later, another of Kulibin's elevators was installed in the Arkhangelskoye near Moscow.

=== Industrial era ===
The development of elevators was led by the need for movement of raw materials, including coal and lumber, from hillsides. The technology developed by these industries, and the introduction of steel beam construction, worked together to provide the passenger and freight elevators in use today. Starting in coal mines, elevators in the mid-19th century operated with steam power, and were used for moving goods in bulk in mines and factories. These devices were soon applied to a diverse set of purposes. In 1823, Burton and Homer, two architects in London, built and operated a novel tourist attraction which they called the "ascending room", which elevated customers to a considerable height in the center of London, providing a panoramic view.

Early, crude steam-driven elevators were refined in the ensuing decade. In 1835, an innovative elevator, the Teagle, was developed by the company Frost and Stutt in England. It was belt-driven and used a counterweight for extra lifting ability.

In 1845, Neapolitan architect Gaetano Genovese installed the "Flying chair", an elevator ahead of its time in the Royal Palace of Caserta. It was covered with chestnut wood outside and with maple wood inside. It included a light, two benches, and a hand-operated signal, and could be activated from the outside, without any effort by the occupants. Traction was controlled by a motor mechanic utilizing a system of toothed wheels. A safety system was designed to take effect if the cords broke, consisting of a beam pushed outwards by a steel spring.

The hydraulic crane was invented by Sir William Armstrong in 1846, primarily for use at the Tyneside docks for loading cargo. They quickly supplanted the earlier steam-driven elevators, exploiting Pascal's law to provide much greater force. A water pump supplied a variable level of water pressure to a plunger encased inside a vertical cylinder, allowing the platform, carrying a heavy load, to be raised and lowered. Counterweights and balances were also used to increase lifting power.

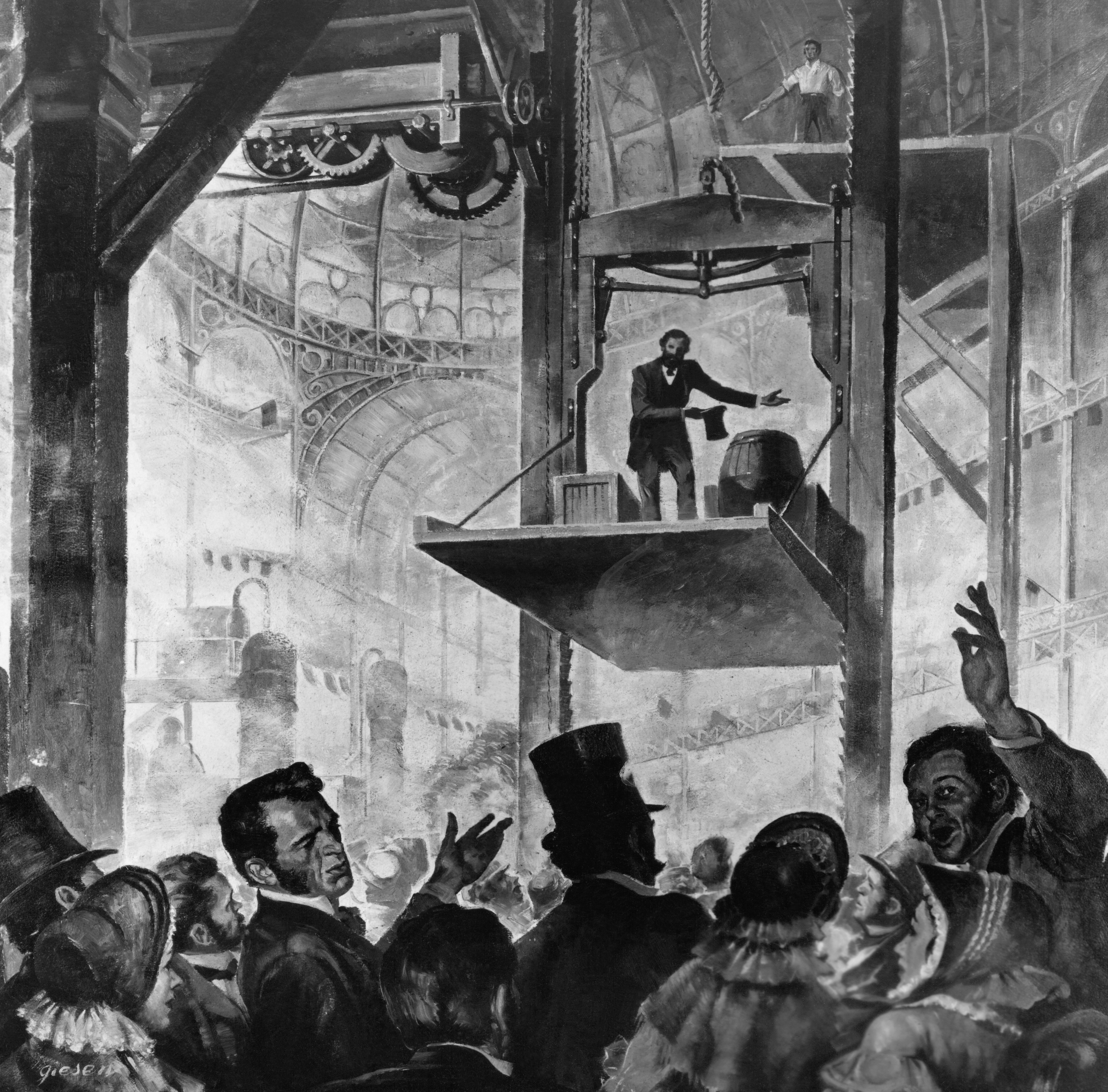
Elisha Otis demonstrating his safety system, at the New York Crystal Palace, 1853

Henry Waterman of New York is credited with inventing the "standing rope control" for an elevator in 1850.

In 1852, Elisha Otis introduced the safety elevator, which prevented the fall of the cab if the cable broke. He demonstrated it at the New York exposition in the Crystal Palace in a dramatic, death-defying presentation in 1854, and the first such passenger elevator was installed at 488 Broadway in New York City on 23 March 1857.

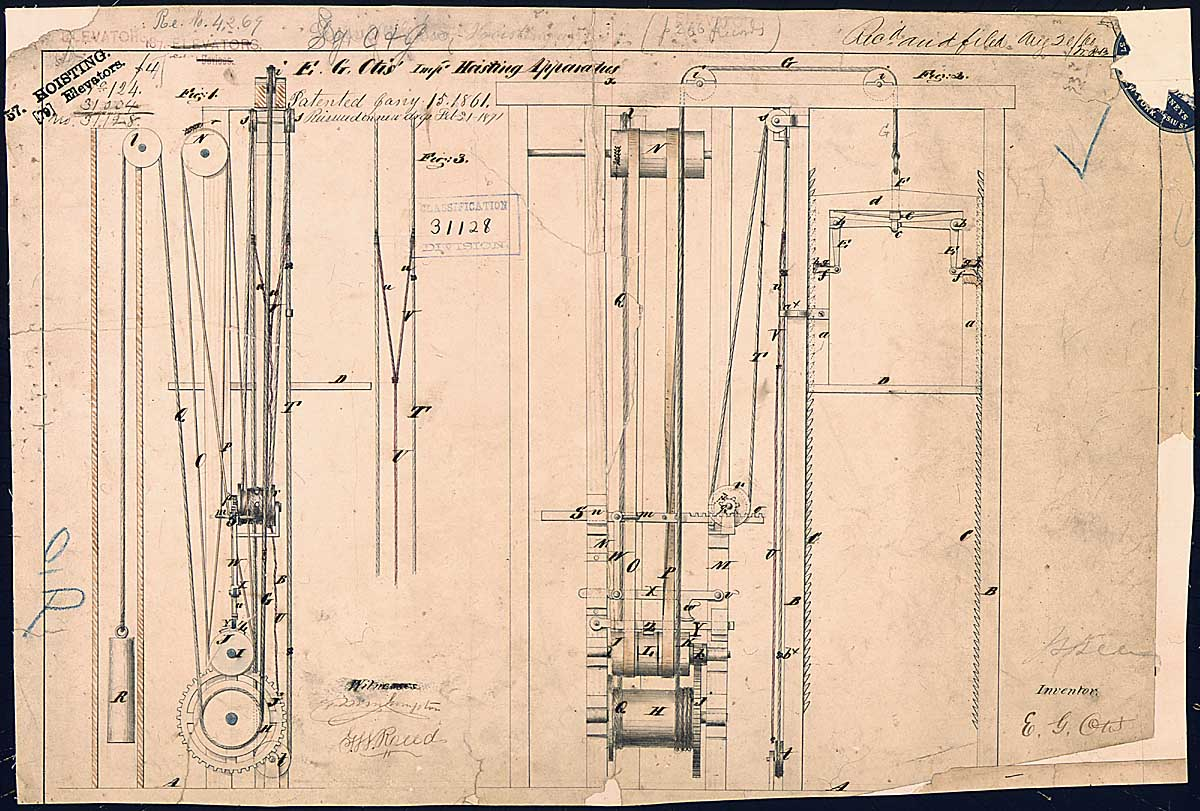
Elisha Otis's elevator patent drawing, 15 January 1861

The first elevator shaft preceded the first elevator by four years. Construction for Peter Cooper's Cooper Union Foundation building in New York began in 1853. An elevator shaft was included in the design because Cooper was confident that a safe passenger elevator would soon be invented. The shaft was cylindrical because Cooper thought it was the most efficient design. Otis later designed a special elevator for the building.

Peter Ellis, an English architect, installed the first elevators that could be described as paternoster elevators in Oriel Chambers in Liverpool in 1868.

The Equitable Life Building, completed in 1870 in New York City, is thought to be the first office building with passenger elevators.

In 1872, American inventor James Wayland patented a novel method of securing elevator shafts with doors that are automatically opened and closed as the elevator car approaches and leaves them.

In 1874, J. W. Meaker patented a method permitting elevator doors to open and close safely.

The first electric elevator was built by Werner von Siemens in 1880 in Germany. Inventor Anton Freissler further developed von Siemens' ideas and created a successful elevator enterprise in Austria-Hungary. The safety and speed of electric elevators were significantly enhanced by Frank Sprague, who added floor control, automatic operation, acceleration control, and further safety devices. His elevator ran faster and with larger loads than hydraulic or steam elevators. 584 of Sprague's elevators were installed before he sold his company to the Otis Elevator Company in 1895. Sprague also developed the idea and technology for multiple elevators in a single shaft.

In 1871, when hydraulic power was a well established technology, Edward B. Ellington founded Wharves and Warehouses Steam Power and Hydraulic Pressure Company, which became the London Hydraulic Power Company in 1883. It constructed a network of high-pressure mains on both sides of the Thames which ultimately extended 184 miles (296 km) and powered some 8,000 machines, predominantly elevators and cranes.

Schuyler Wheeler patented his electric elevator design in 1883.

In 1884, David Humphreys of Norfolk, Virginia, patented an elevator with automatic doors that closed off the elevator shaft when the car was not passing through parts of the shaft. In 1887, Alexander Miles of Duluth, Minnesota, patented an elevator with automatic doors that prevented the shaft from being accessible unless the car was at that location.

In 1891, American inventors Joseph Kelly and William L. Woods co-patented a novel way to guard elevator shafts against accident, by way of hatches that would automatically open and close as the car passed through them.

The first elevator in India was installed at the Government House in Calcutta by Otis in 1892.

By 1900, completely automated elevators were available, but passengers were reluctant to use them. Throughout the 1920s, “automatic elevators” were regularly being installed in even average residential or mixed use buildings. Their adoption was aided by a 1945 elevator operator strike in New York City, and the addition of an emergency stop button, emergency telephone, and a soothing explanatory automated voice. Also around this time saw the installation of radios and later Muzak piped music to fill background voids.

=== Modern elevators era ===
In 2000, the first vacuum elevator was offered commercially in Argentina.

Green elevators achieve kinetic and potential energy recovery, along with more durable technology. For example, more efficient coordination between different elevators.

In Asia, screens in elevators are commonplace to help passengers pass the time during their journey and can generate additional revenue.

Some cruise ships have been updated with smart elevators since 2020s to avoid traffic congestion.

== Design ==
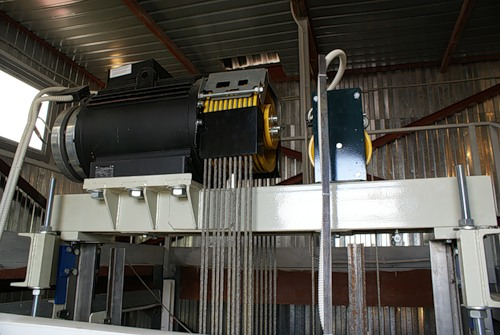
Elevator machine room

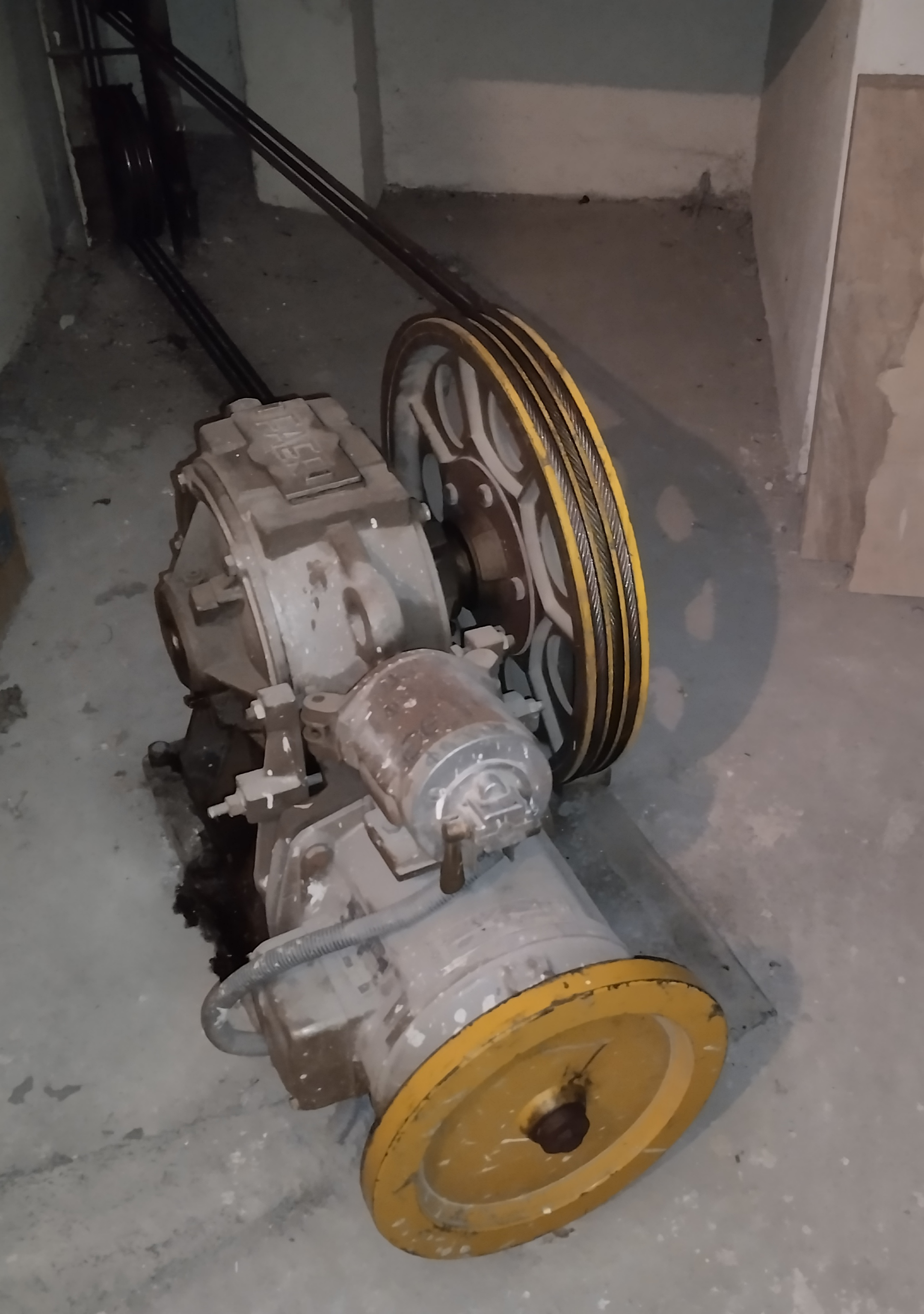
Geared traction elevator 3-phase motor

An elevator is essentially a platform that is either pulled or pushed up by mechanical means. A modern-day elevator consists of a cab (also called a cabin, compartment, cage, carriage, coach, or car) mounted on a platform within an enclosed space called a shaft or sometimes a hoistway. In the past, elevator drive mechanisms were powered by steam and water hydraulic pistons or by hand. In a traction elevator, cars are pulled up by means of rolling steel ropes over a deeply grooved pulley, commonly called a sheave in the industry. The weight of the car is balanced by a counterweight. Often two elevators (or sometimes three) are built so that their cars always move synchronously in opposite directions, and are each other's counterweight. The elevator cab and counterweight travel along guide rails. The car and counter weight follow the guide rails using oil-lubricated guide shoes, roller guide shoes in high speed elevators, active roller guides or maglev shoes. Active roller guides use electromagnets as shock absorbers in high speed elevators.

The friction between the ropes and the pulley furnishes the traction which gives this type of elevator its name.

Hydraulic elevators use the principles of hydraulics (in the sense of hydraulic power) to pressurize an above-ground or in-ground piston to raise and lower the car. Roped hydraulics use a combination of both ropes and hydraulic power to raise and lower cars. Recent innovations include permanent magnet motors, machine room-less rail mounted gearless machines, and microprocessor controls.

The technology used in new installations depends on a variety of factors. Hydraulic elevators are cheaper, but installing cylinders greater than a certain length becomes impractical for very-high lift hoistways. For buildings of much over seven floors, traction elevators must be employed instead. Hydraulic elevators are usually slower than traction elevators.

Elevators are a candidate for mass customization. There are economies to be made from mass production of the components, but each building comes with its own requirements like different number of floors, dimensions of the well and usage patterns. High speed elevators can have aerodynamic cabs and counterweights to reduce air resistance when moving at high speed, as well as pressure control systems for the cab to reduce ear popping discomfort in supertall buildings.

=== Doors ===
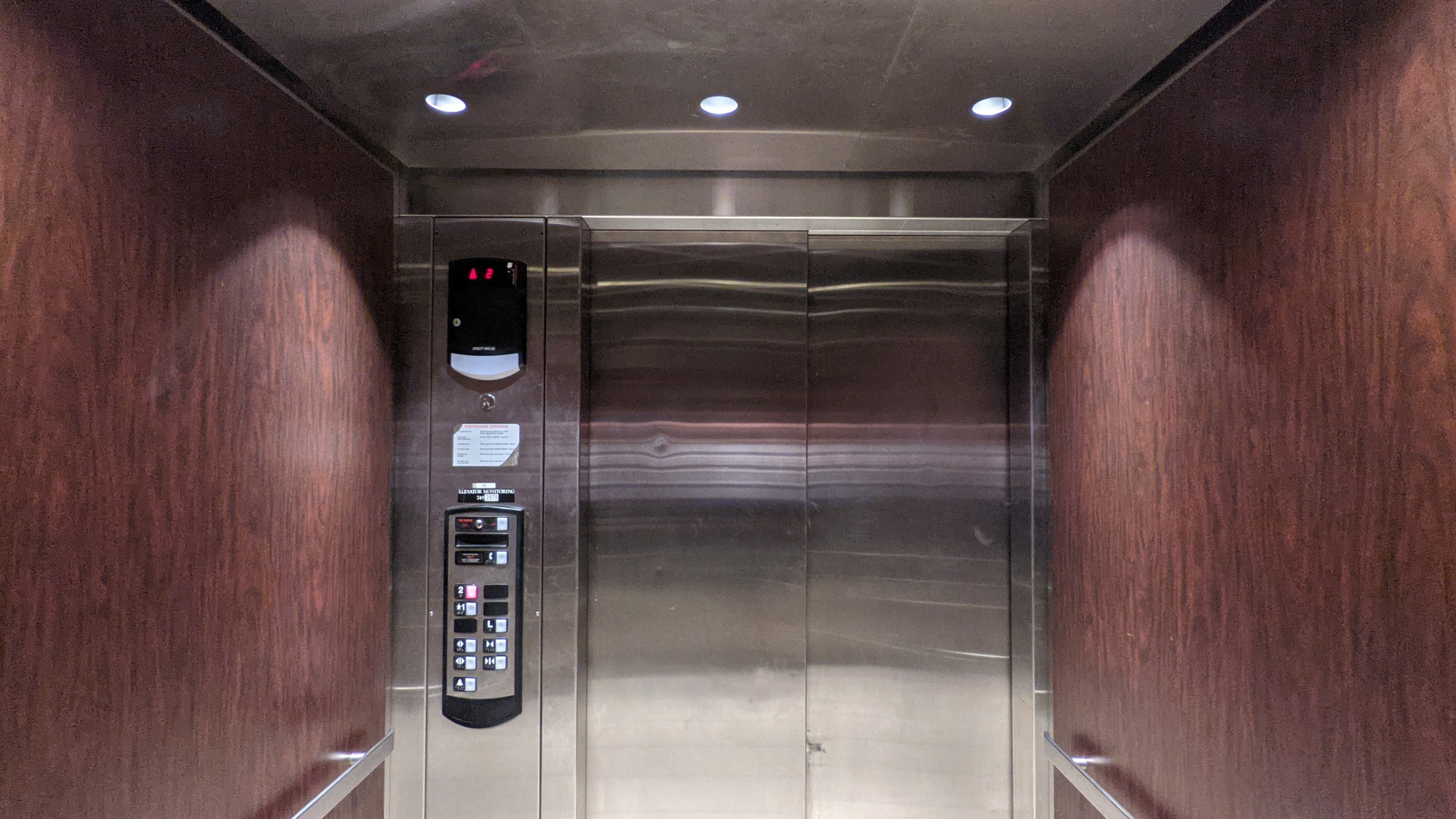
Cascading telescopic 2-speed door configuration inside of an elevator

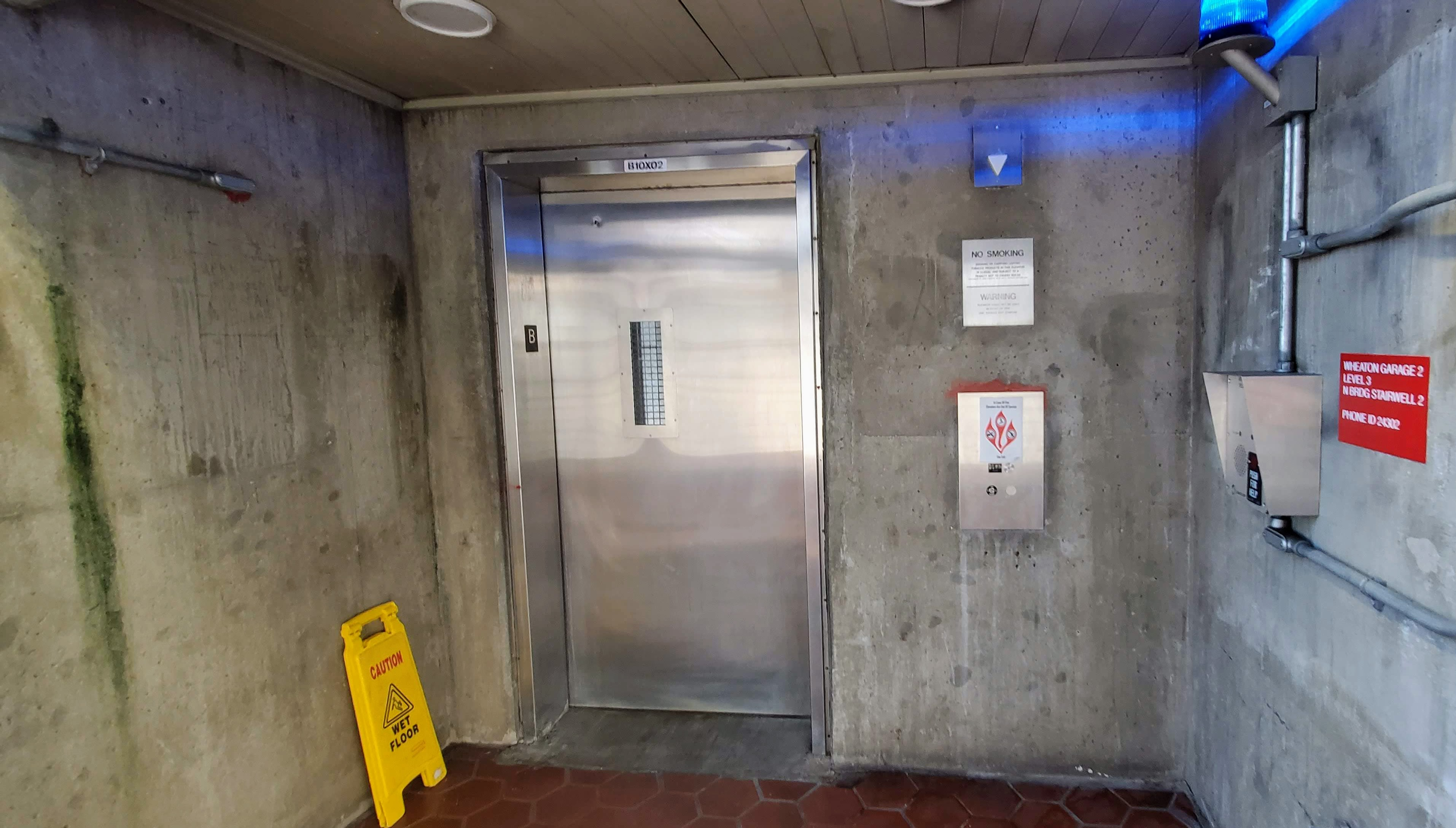
A large "slab" door

Elevator doors prevent riders from falling into, entering, or tampering with anything in the shaft. The most common configuration is to have two panels that meet in the middle and slide open laterally. These are known as "center-opening". In a cascading telescopic configuration (potentially allowing wider entryways within limited space), the doors roll on independent tracks so that while open, they are tucked behind one another, and while closed, they form cascading layers on one side. This can be configured so that two sets of such cascading doors operate like the center opening doors described above, allowing for a very wide elevator cab. In less expensive installations the elevator can also use one large "slab" door: a single panel door the width of the doorway that opens to the left or right laterally. These are known as "single slide" doors. Some buildings have elevators with the single door on the shaftway, and double cascading doors on the cab.

=== Machine room-less (MRL) elevators ===
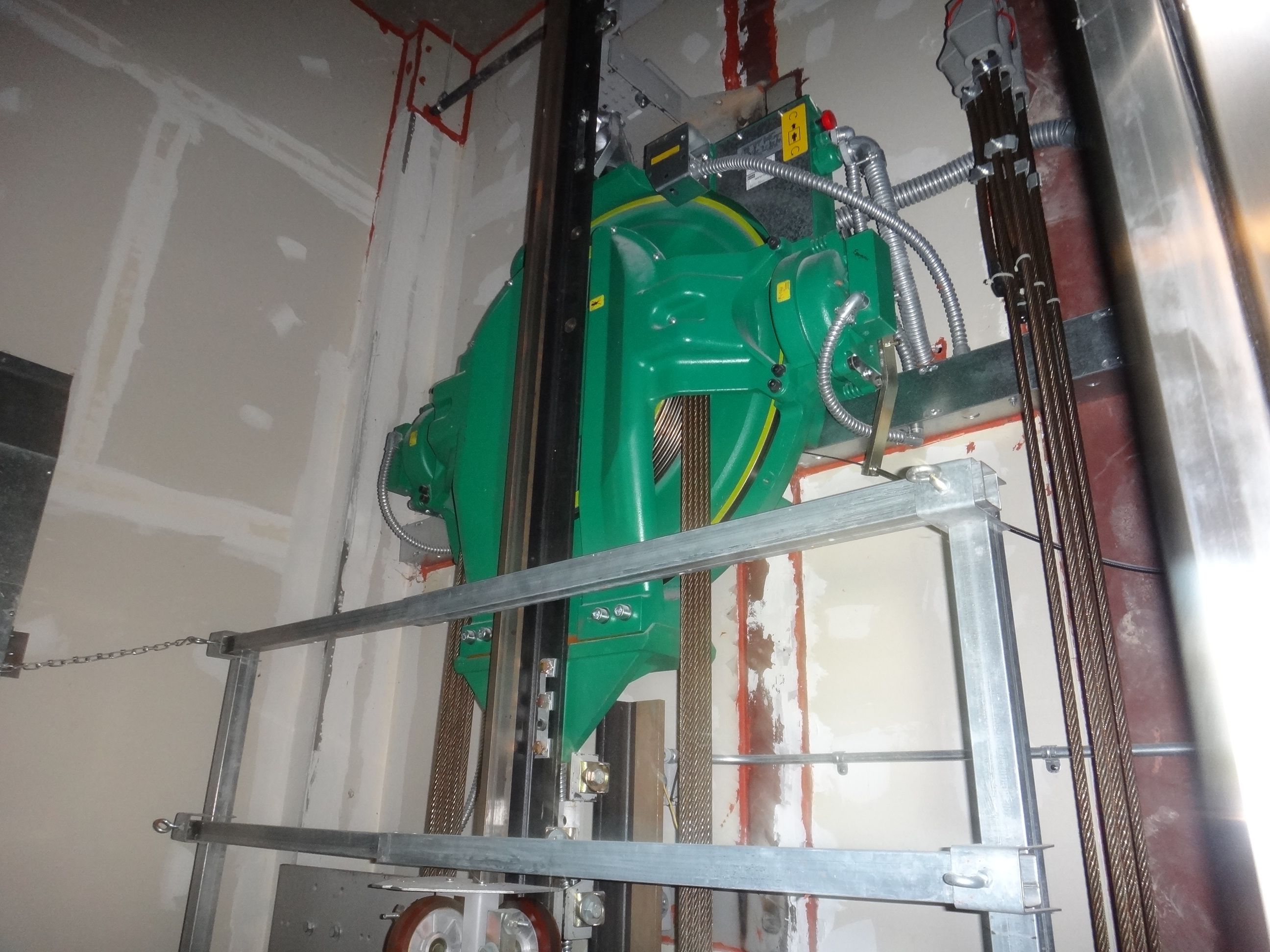
Kone EcoDisc. The entire drive system is in the hoistway.

Elevators that do not require separate machine rooms are designed so that most of their power and control components fit within the hoistway (the shaft containing the elevator car), and a small cabinet houses the controller. The equipment is otherwise similar to that of a normal traction or hole-less hydraulic elevator. The world's first machine-room-less elevator, the Kone MonoSpace, was introduced in the year 1996, by Kone. Compared to traditional elevators, it:

- Required less space
- Used 70–80% less energy
- Used no hydraulic oil (in contrast to traditional hydraulic units)
- Had all components above ground (avoiding the environmental concern created by the hydraulic cylinder on direct hydraulic-type elevators being underground)
- Cost somewhat less than other systems, and significantly less than the hydraulic MRL elevator
- Could operate at faster speeds than hydraulics, but not normal traction units

Its disadvantage was that it could be harder, and significantly more dangerous, to service and maintain. Some MRL elevators adopt steel belts instead of ropes to reduce the diameter of the drive sheave. It is possible to have an extra-reduced shaft head elevator where the height required for the machinery above the last floor is eliminated and thus, for servicing, the elevator cabin ceiling has to be dropped.

==== Other facts ====
- Noise level of 50–55 dBA (A-weighted decibels), lower than some but not all types of elevators
- Usually used for low-rise to mid-rise buildings
- National and local building codes did not address elevators without machine rooms. Residential MRL elevators are still not allowed by the ASME A17 code in the US. MRL elevators have been recognized in the 2005 supplement to the 2004 A17.1 Elevator Code.
- Today, some machine room-less hydraulic elevators by Otis and TK Elevator exist. They do not involve the use of an underground piston or a machine room, mitigating environmental concerns; however, they are not allowed by codes in some parts of the United States.

=== Double-decker elevators ===
Double-decker elevators are traction elevators with cars that have an upper and lower deck. Both decks, which can serve a floor at the same time, are usually driven by the same motor. The system increases efficiency in high-rise buildings, and saves space so additional shafts and cars are not required.

In 2003, TK Elevator invented a system called TWIN, with two elevator cars independently running in one shaft.

== Traffic calculations ==
=== Round-trip time calculations ===
==== History ====
In 1901, consulting engineer Charles G. Darrach (1846–1927) proposed the first formula to determine elevator service.

In 1908, Reginald P. Bolton published the first book devoted to this subject, Elevator Service. The summation of his work was a massive fold-out chart (placed at the back of his book) that allowed users to determine the number of express and local elevators needed for a given building to meet a desired interval of service.

In 1912, commercial engineer Edmund F. Tweedy and electrical engineer Arthur Williams co-authored a book titled Commercial Engineering for Central Stations. He followed Bolton's lead and developed a "Chart for determining the number and size of elevators required for office buildings of a given total occupied floor area".

In 1920, Howard B. Cook presented a paper titled "Passenger Elevator Service". This paper marked the first time a member of the elevator industry offered a mathematical means of determining elevator service. His formula determined the round trip time (RTT) by finding the single trip time, doubling it, and adding 10 seconds.

In 1923, Bassett Jones published an article titled "The Probable Number of Stops Made by an Elevator". He based his equations on the theory of probabilities and found a reasonably accurate method of calculating the average stop count. The equation in this article assumed a consistent population on every floor.

$$S=n\{1-\left ( \frac{n-1}{n} \right )^N\}$$

He went on to write an updated version of his equations in 1926 which accounted for variable population on each floor. Jones credited David Lindquist for the development of the equation but provides no indication as to when it was first proposed.

$$S=n-\{    \left ( \frac{P-P_a}{P} \right )^N + \left ( \frac{P-P_b}{P} \right )^N + ... + \left ( \frac{P-P_n}{P} \right )^N   \}$$

Although the equations were there, elevator traffic analysis was still a very specialist task that could only be done by world experts. That was until 1967 when Strakosch wrote an eight step method for finding the efficiency of a system in "Vertical transportation: Elevators and Escalators".

==== Uppeak calculations ====
In 1975, Barney and Dos Santos developed and published the "Round Trip Time (RTT) formula", which followed Strakosch's work. This was the first formulized mathematical model and is the simplest form that is still used by traffic analyzers today.

$$RTT = Ht_1 + t_2(S + 1) + 2Pt_3$$

Modification and improvements have been made to this equation over the years, most significantly in 2000 when Peters published "Improvements to the Up Peak Round Trip Time Calculation" which improved the accuracy of the flight time calculation, making allowances for short elevator journeys when the car does not reach maximum rated speed or acceleration, and added the functionality of express zones. This equation is now referred to as the 'Up peak Calculation' as it uses the assumption that all the passengers are coming into the building from the ground floor (incoming traffic) and that there are no passengers traveling from a higher floor to the ground floor (outgoing traffic) and no passengers traveling from one internal floor to another (interfloor traffic). This model works well if a building is at its most busy first thing in the morning; however, in more complicated elevator systems, this model does not work.

==== General analysis ====
In 1990, Peters published a paper titled "Lift Traffic Analysis: Formulae for the General Case" in which he developed a new formula which would account for mixed traffic patterns as well as accounting for passenger bunching using Poisson approximation. This new General Analysis equation enabled much more complex systems to be analyzed however the equations had now become so complex that it was almost impossible to do manually and it became necessary to use software to run the calculations. The GA formula was extended even further in 1996 to account for double deck elevators.

=== Simulations ===
RTT calculations establish an elevator system's handling capacity by using a set of repeatable calculations which, for a given set of inputs, always produce the same answer. It works well for simple systems; but as systems get more complex, the calculations are harder to develop and implement. For very complex systems, the solution is to simulate the building.

==== Dispatcher-based simulation ====
In this method, a virtual version of a building is created on a computer, modeling passengers and elevators as realistically as possible, and random numbers are used to model probability rather than mathematical equations and percentage probability.

Dispatcher-based simulation has had major improvements over the years, but the principle remains the same. The most widely used simulator, Elevate, was first showcased in 1998 as Elevate Lite.

Although it is currently the most accurate method of modeling an elevator system, the method does have drawbacks. Unlike calculations, it does not find a RTT value because it does not run standard round trips; thus it does not conform with standardized elevator-traffic analysis methodology, and cannot be used to find values such as average interval; instead, it is generally used to find the average waiting time.

==== Monte Carlo simulation ====
At the first Elevator and Escalator symposium in 2011, Al-Sharif proposed an alternative form of simulation that modeled a car's single round trip before restarting and running again. This method is still capable of modeling complex systems, and also conforms with standard methodology by producing an RTT value. The model was improved further in 2018 when Al-Sharif demonstrated a way to reintroduce a dispatcher-like function which can model destination control systems.

While this does successfully remove simulation's major drawback, it is not quite as accurate as dispatcher-based simulations given its simplifications and non-continual nature. The Monte Carlo method also requires passenger count as an input, rather than passengers per second, in other methodologies.

== Types of hoist mechanisms ==
Elevators can be rope dependent or rope-free. There are at least four means of moving an elevator:

=== Traction elevators ===
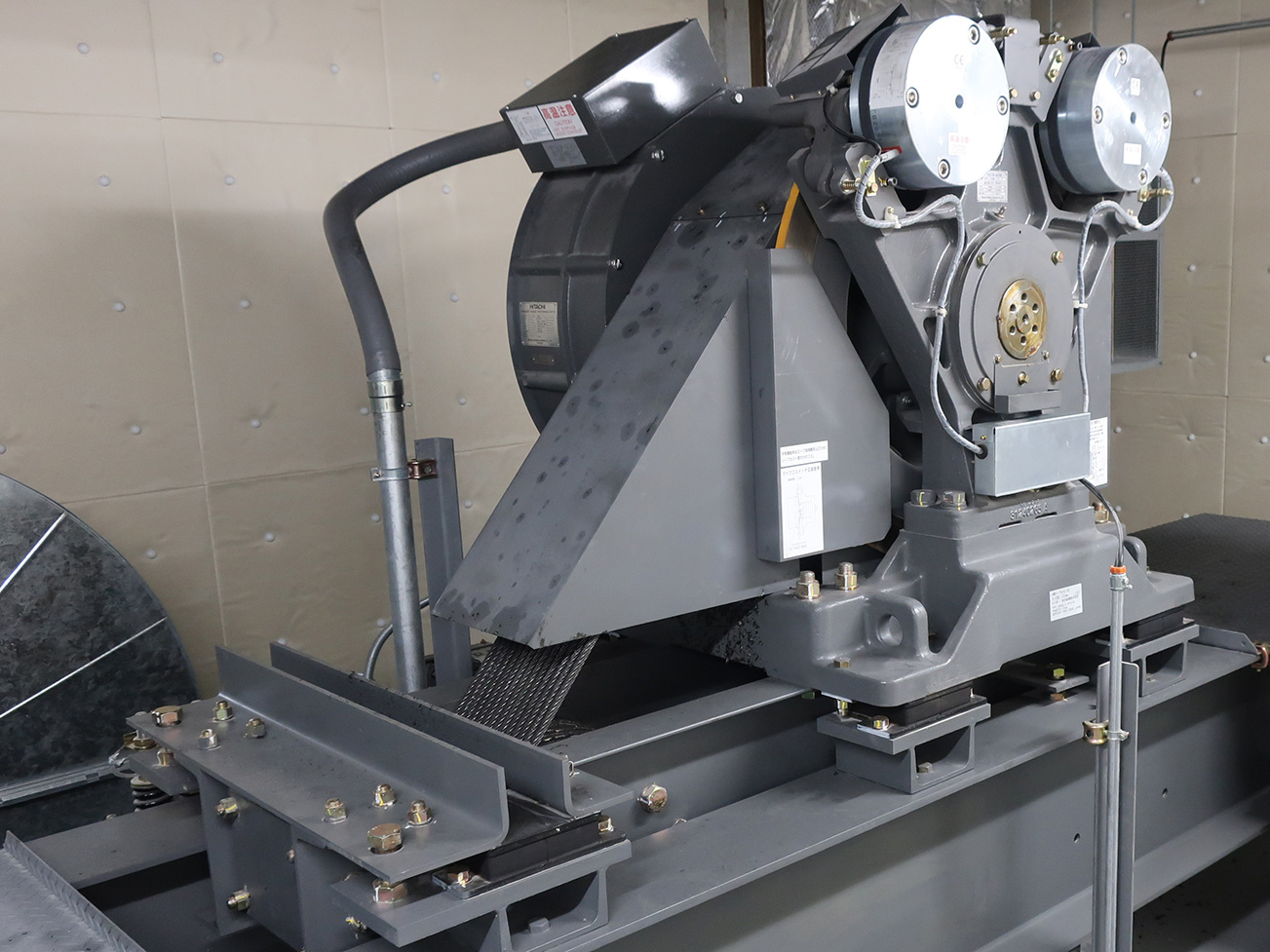
Steel ropes and an electric motor (machine) in the machine room. This is a gearless machine. The machine has two brake calipers on top.

Geared traction machines are driven by AC or DC electric motors. Geared machines commonly use worm gears, to control mechanical movement of elevator cars by "rolling" steel hoist ropes over a drive sheave which is attached to a gearbox driven by a high-speed motor. It's also possible to use planetary or helical gears instead. These machines are generally the best option for basement or overhead traction use for speeds up to 3 m/s (500 ft/min).

Historically, in the US, AC motors were used for single or double-speed elevator machines on the grounds of cost and lower usage applications where car speed and passenger comfort were less of an issue, but for higher speed, larger capacity elevators, the need for infinitely variable speed control over the traction machine becomes an issue. Therefore, DC machines powered by an AC/DC motor generator were the preferred solution. The MG set also typically powered the relay controller of the elevator, which has the added advantage of electrically isolating the elevators from the rest of a building's electrical system, thus eliminating the transient power spikes in the building's electrical supply caused by the motors starting and stopping (causing lighting to dim every time the elevators are used for example), as well as interference to other electrical equipment caused by the arcing of the relay contactors in the control system.

The widespread availability of variable frequency AC drives has allowed AC motors to be used universally, bringing with it the advantages of the older motor-generator, DC-based systems, without the penalties in terms of efficiency and complexity. The older MG-based installations are gradually being replaced in older buildings due to their poor energy efficiency. DC Gearless traction machines were introduced in the 1930s by manufacturers such as Otis and Westinghouse, and AC permanent magnet machines controlled by inverters were introduced in 1995 by Otis and the Kone EcoDisc.

Gearless traction machines are low-speed (low-RPM), high-torque electric motors powered either by AC or DC. In this case, the drive sheave is directly attached to the end of the motor. Gearless traction elevators can reach speeds of up to 20 m/s (4,000 ft/min), A brake is mounted between the motor and gearbox or between the motor and drive sheave or at the end of the drive sheave to hold the elevator stationary at a floor. This brake is usually an external drum type and is actuated by spring force and held open electrically; a power failure will cause the brake to engage and prevent the elevator from falling (see inherent safety and safety engineering). But it can also be some form of disc type like one or more calipers over a disc in one end of the motor shaft or drive sheave which is used in high speed, high rise and large capacity elevators with machine rooms (an exception is the Kone MonoSpace's EcoDisc which is not high speed, high rise and large capacity and is machine room less but it uses the same design as is a thinner version of a conventional gearless traction machine) for braking power, compactness and redundancy (assuming there are at least two calipers on the disc), or one or more disc brakes with a single caliper at one end of the motor shaft or drive sheave which is used in machine room less elevators for compactness, braking power, and redundancy (assuming there are two or more brakes).

In each case, steel or kevlar cables are attached to a hitch plate on top of the cab or may be "underslung" below a cab, and then looped over the drive sheave to a counterweight attached to the opposite end of the cables which reduces the amount of power needed to move the cab. The counterweight is located in the hoist-way and is carried along a separate railway system; as the car goes up, the counterweight goes down, and vice versa. This action is powered by the traction machine which is directed by the controller, typically a relay logic or computerized device that directs starting, acceleration, deceleration and stopping of the elevator cab. The weight of the counterweight is typically equal to the weight of the elevator cab plus 40–50% of the capacity of the elevator. The grooves in the drive sheave are specially designed to prevent the cables from slipping. "Traction" is provided to the ropes by the grip of the grooves in the sheave, thereby the name. As the ropes age and the traction grooves wear, some traction is lost and the ropes must be replaced and the sheave repaired or replaced. Sheave and rope wear may be significantly reduced by ensuring that all ropes have equal tension, thus sharing the load evenly. Rope tension equalization may be achieved using a rope tension gauge, and is a simple way to extend the lifetime of the sheaves and ropes.

Elevators with more than 30 m (98 ft) of travel have a system called compensation. This is a separate set of cables or a chain attached to the bottom of the counterweight and the bottom of the elevator cab. This makes it easier to control the elevator, as it compensates for the differing weight of cable between the hoist and the cab. If the elevator cab is at the top of the hoist-way, there is a short length of hoist cable above the car and a long length of compensating cable below the car and vice versa for the counterweight. If the compensation system uses cables, there will be an additional sheave in the pit below the elevator, to guide the cables. If the compensation system uses chains, the chain is guided by a bar mounted between the counterweight tracks. The traction machine can be placed above the hoistway, or at the bottom, besides the hoistway.

Winding drum elevators do not use a counterweight; instead, the elevator rope is wound and unwound from a drum as the elevator raises and lowers. According to EN A17.1, these elevators can't be used for passengers, can't travel faster than 0.25 m/s and can't travel more than 12.2 meters. The drum has grooves and only one layer of rope is wound on the drum. This extends rope and groove life. Kone developed a counterweight-free elevator, marketed as the MaxiSpace PowerDisc, to increase the size of the elevator car in the shaft. The SchindlerMobile MRL elevator used smooth wheels under the elevator car and smooth rails, which via friction between the rail and wheels could raise or lower the car.

Elevators can use 1:1, 2:1 or 4:1 roping. These are effectively reduction ratios for the traction machine, using the roping arrangement as if it were a reduction gear. The higher the ratio, the slower the elevator but the capacity is higher. Single wrap traction wraps the rope through the drive sheave once, where as Double wrap traction wraps it twice. Double wrap traction is used to place more friction on the rope for increased traction. The drive sheave can have one of several types of grooves such as round or V grooves, to balance rope wear with traction obtained through friction. The number of ropes used largely depends on the required traction for the carrying capacity of the elevator, and usually not the strength of the rope. Kone developed carbon fiber ropes for travel heights of over 500 meters, since they are much lighter than steel ropes and this limits travel height to about 500 meters.

==== Regenerative drives ====
Another energy-saving improvement is the regenerative drive, which works analogously to regenerative braking in vehicles, using the elevator's electric motor as a generator to capture some of the gravitational potential energy of descent of a full cab (heavier than its counterweight) or ascent of an empty cab (lighter than its counterweight) and return it to the building's electrical system.

=== Hydraulic elevators ===
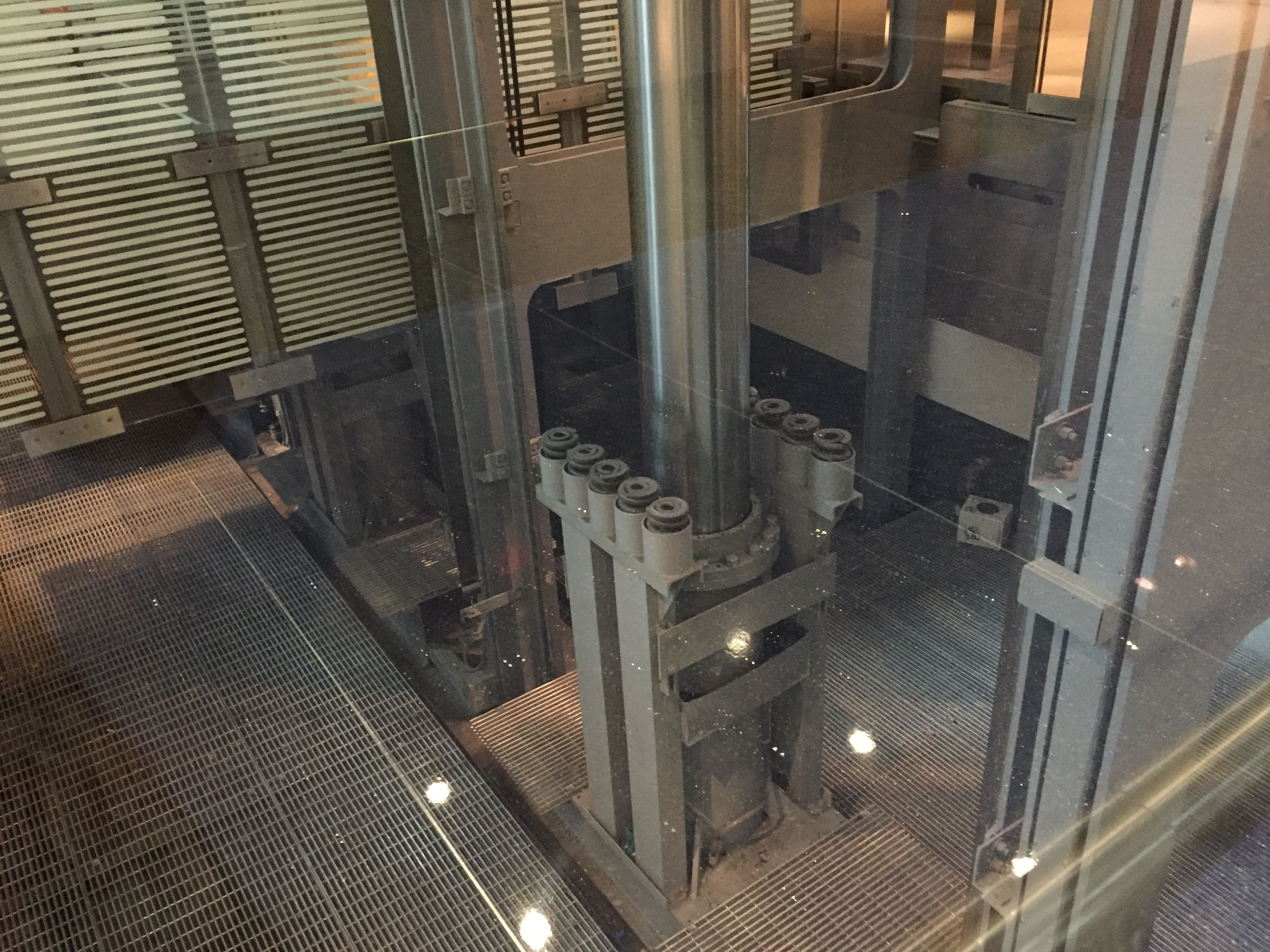
Pit of a hydraulic scenic elevator with metal grating on bottom. This elevator travels seven stories.

- Conventional hydraulic elevators. They use an underground hydraulic cylinder, are quite common for low level buildings with two to five floors (sometimes but seldom up to six to eight floors), and have speeds of up to 1 m/s (200 ft/min).
- Holeless hydraulic elevators were developed in the 1970s, and use a pair of above-ground cylinders, which makes it practical for environmentally or cost-sensitive buildings with two, three, or four floors.
- Roped hydraulic elevators use both above-ground cylinders and a rope system, allowing the elevator to travel further than the piston has to move.

The low mechanical complexity of hydraulic elevators in comparison to traction elevators makes them ideal for low-rise, low-traffic installations. They are less energy-efficient as the pump works against gravity to push the car and its passengers upwards; this energy is lost when the car descends on its own weight. The high current draw of the pump when starting up also places higher demands on a building's electrical system. There are also environmental concerns should the lifting cylinder leak fluid into the ground, hence the development of holeless hydraulic elevators, which also eliminate the need for a relatively deep hole in the bottom of the elevator shaft.

=== Electromagnetic propulsion ===
Cable-free elevators using electromagnetic propulsion, capable of moving both vertically and horizontally, have been developed by German engineering firm Thyssen Krupp for use in high-rise, high-density buildings.

=== Climbing elevator ===
A climbing elevator is a self-ascending elevator with its own propulsion. The propulsion can be done by an electric or a combustion engine. Climbing elevators are used in guyed masts or towers, in order to make easy access to parts of these constructions, such as flight safety lamps for maintenance. An example would be the moonlight towers in Austin, Texas, where the elevator holds only one person and equipment for maintenance. The Glasgow Tower—an observation tower in Glasgow, Scotland—also makes use of two climbing elevators. Temporary climbing elevators are commonly used in the construction of new high-rise buildings to move materials and personnel before the building's permanent elevator system is installed, at which point the climbing elevators are dismantled.

=== Pneumatic elevator ===
An elevator of this kind uses a vacuum on top of the cab and a valve on the top of the "shaft" to move the cab upwards and closes the valve in order to keep the cab at the same level. A diaphragm or a piston is used as a "brake", if there is a sudden increase in pressure above the cab. To go down, it opens the valve so that the air can pressurize the top of the "shaft", allowing the cab to go down by its own weight. This also means that in case of a power failure, the cab will automatically go down. The "shaft" is made of acrylic, and is always round due to the shape of the vacuum pump. To keep the air inside of the cab, rubber seals are used. Due to technical limitations, these elevators have a low capacity, they usually allow 1–3 passengers and up to 525 pounds (238 kg).

== Controls ==
=== Manual controls ===
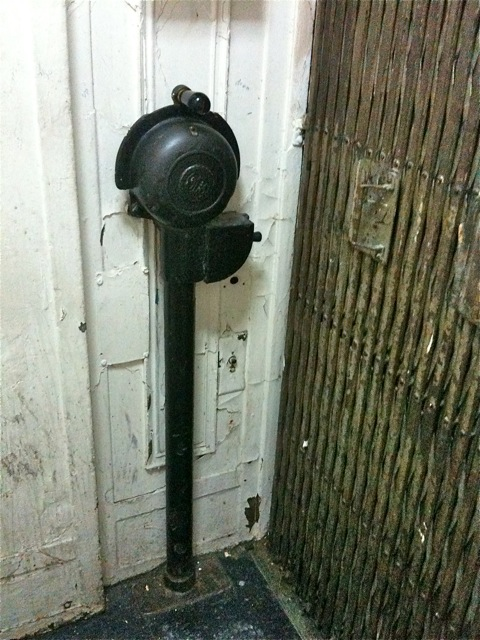
Otis 1920s controller, operational in a New York City apartment building

In the first half of the twentieth century, almost all elevators had no automatic positioning of the floor on which the cab would stop. Some of the older freight elevators were controlled by switches operated by pulling on adjacent ropes. In general, most elevators before WWII were manually controlled by elevator operators using a rheostat connected to the motor. This rheostat (see picture) was enclosed within a cylindrical container about the size and shape of a cake. This was mounted upright or sideways on the cab wall and operated via a projecting handle, which was able to slide around the top half of the cylinder.

The elevator motor was located at the top of the shaft or beside the bottom of the shaft. Pushing the handle forward would cause the cab to rise; backwards would make it sink. The harder the pressure, the faster the elevator would move. The handle also served as a dead man switch: if the operator let go of the handle, it would return to its upright position, causing the elevator cab to stop. In time, safety interlocks would ensure that the inner and outer doors were closed before the elevator was allowed to move.

This lever would allow some control over the energy supplied to the motor and so enabled the elevator to be accurately positioned—if the operator was sufficiently skilled. More typically, the operator would have to "jog" the control, moving the cab in small increments until the elevator was reasonably close to the landing point. Then the operator would direct the outgoing and incoming passengers to "watch the step".

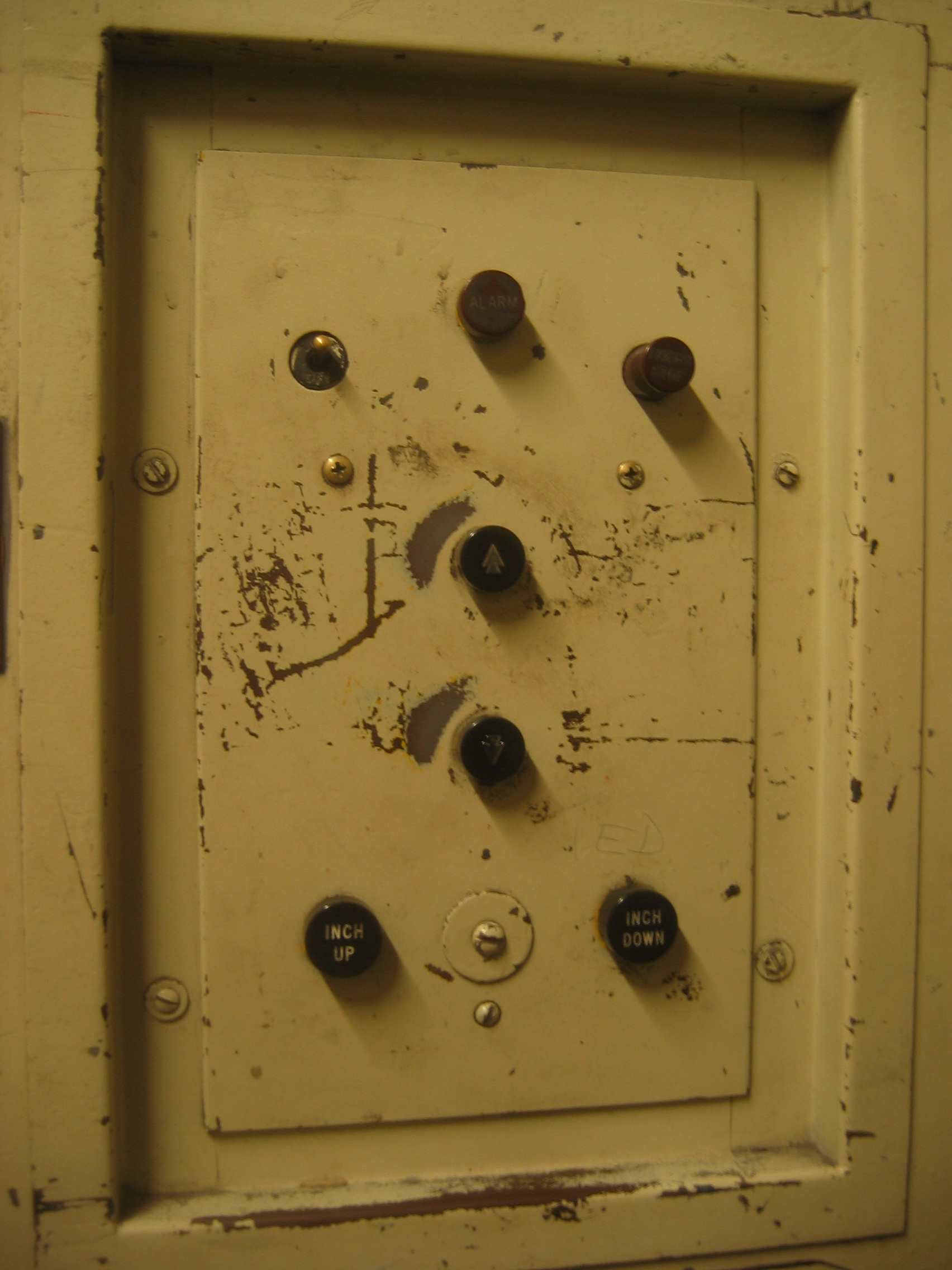
Manual pushbutton elevator controls

The Otis Autotronic system of the early 1950s brought the earliest predictive systems which could anticipate traffic patterns within a building to deploy elevator movement in the most efficient manner. Relay-controlled elevator systems remained common until the 1980s; they were gradually replaced with solid-state systems, and microprocessor-based controls are now the industry standard. Most older, manually operated elevators have been retrofitted with automatic or semi-automatic controls.

=== General controls ===
A typical modern passenger elevator will have:

- Outside the elevator, buttons to go up or down (the bottom floor only has the up button, the top floor only has the down button, and every floor in between (usually) has both)
- Space to stand in, guardrails, seating cushion (luxury)
- Overload sensor – prevents the elevator from moving until excess load has been removed. It may trigger a voice prompt or buzzer alarm. This may also trigger a "full car" indicator, indicating the car's inability to accept more passengers until some are unloaded.
- Electric fans or air conditioning units to enhance circulation and comfort.
- A control panel with various buttons. In many countries, button text and icons are raised to allow blind users to operate the elevator; many have Braille text besides. Buttons include:
- Call buttons to choose a floor. Some of these may be key switches (to control access). In some elevators, such as those in some hotels, certain floors are inaccessible unless one swipes a security card or enters a passcode.
- An alarm button or switch, which passengers can use to warn the premises manager that they have been trapped in the elevator. Some elevators also have emergency telephones to summon help in the event of entrapment. In many jurisdictions this is required by law.
- Door open and door close buttons.

The operation of the door open button is transparent, immediately opening and holding the door, typically until a timeout occurs and the door closes. The operation of the door close button is less transparent, and it often appears to do nothing, leading to frequent but incorrect reports that the door close button is a placebo button: either not wired up at all, or inactive in normal service. On many older elevators, if one is present, the door close button is functional because the elevator is not ADA compliant and/or it does not have a fire service mode. Working door open and door close buttons are required by code in many jurisdictions, including the United States, specifically for emergency operation: in independent mode, the door open and door close buttons are used to manually open or close the door. Beyond this, programming varies significantly, with some door close buttons immediately closing the door, but in other cases being delayed by an overall timeout, so the door cannot be closed until a few seconds after opening. In this case (hastening normal closure), the door close button has no effect. However, the door close button will cause a hall call to be ignored (so the door will not reopen), and once the timeout has expired, the door close will immediately close the door, for example, to cancel a door open push. The minimum timeout for automatic door closing in the US is 5 seconds, which is a noticeable delay if not over-ridden.

- A set of doors kept locked on each floor to prevent unintentional access into the elevator shaft by the unsuspecting individual. The door is unlocked and opened by a machine sitting on the roof of the car, which also drives the doors that travel with the car. Door controls are provided to close immediately or reopen the doors, although the button to close them immediately is often disabled during normal operations, especially on more recent elevators. Objects in the path of the moving doors will either be detected by sensors or physically activate a switch that reopens the doors. Otherwise, the doors will close after a preset time. Some elevators are configured to remain open at the floor until they are required to move again. Regulations often require doors to close after use to prevent smoke from entering the elevator shaft in event of fire.
- A stop switch to halt the elevator while in motion, which is often used to hold an elevator open while freight is loaded. Keeping an elevator stopped for too long may set off an alarm. Unless local codes require otherwise, this will most likely be a key switch.

Some elevators may have one or more of the following:

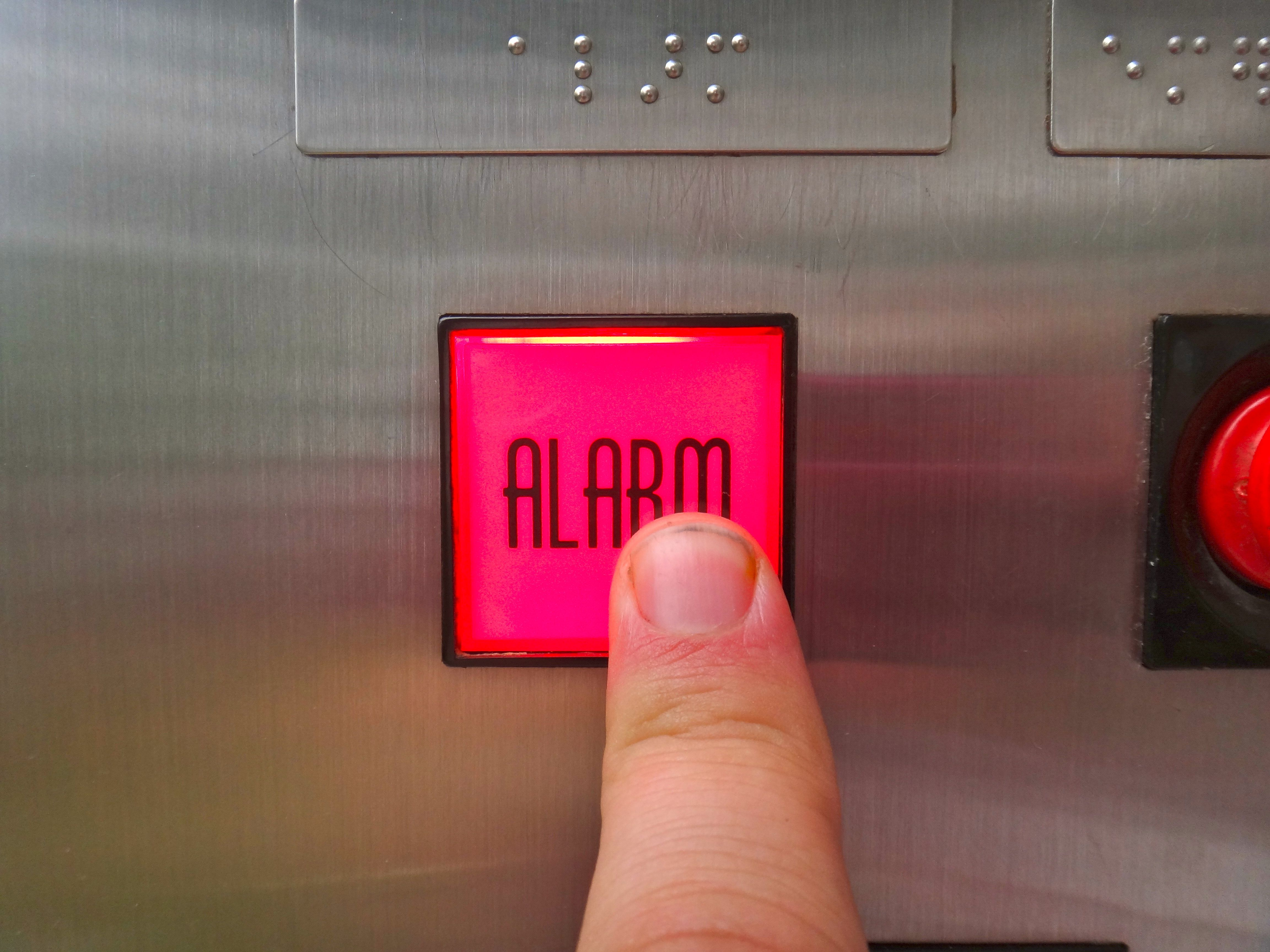
- Using the emergency telephone button in an elevator. There is Braille text for visually impaired people and a button illuminates to alert a hearing impaired person that the alarm is ringing and the call is being placed.
  An elevator telephone, which can be used (in addition to the alarm) by a trapped passenger to call for help. This may consist of a transceiver, or simply a button. This feature is often required by local regulations.
- Hold button: This button delays the door closing timer, useful for loading freight and hospital beds.
- Call cancellation: A destination floor may be deselected by double clicking.
- Access restriction by key switches, RFID reader, code keypad, hotel room card, etc.
- One or more additional sets of doors. This is primarily used to serve different floor plans: on each floor only one set of doors opens. For example, in an elevated crosswalk setup, the front doors may open on the street level, and the rear doors open on the crosswalk level. This is also common in garages, rail stations, and airports. Alternatively, both doors may open on a given floor. This is sometimes timed so that one side opens first for getting off, and then the other side opens for getting on, to improve boarding/exiting speed. This is particularly useful when passengers have luggage or carts, as at an airport, due to reduced maneuverability.
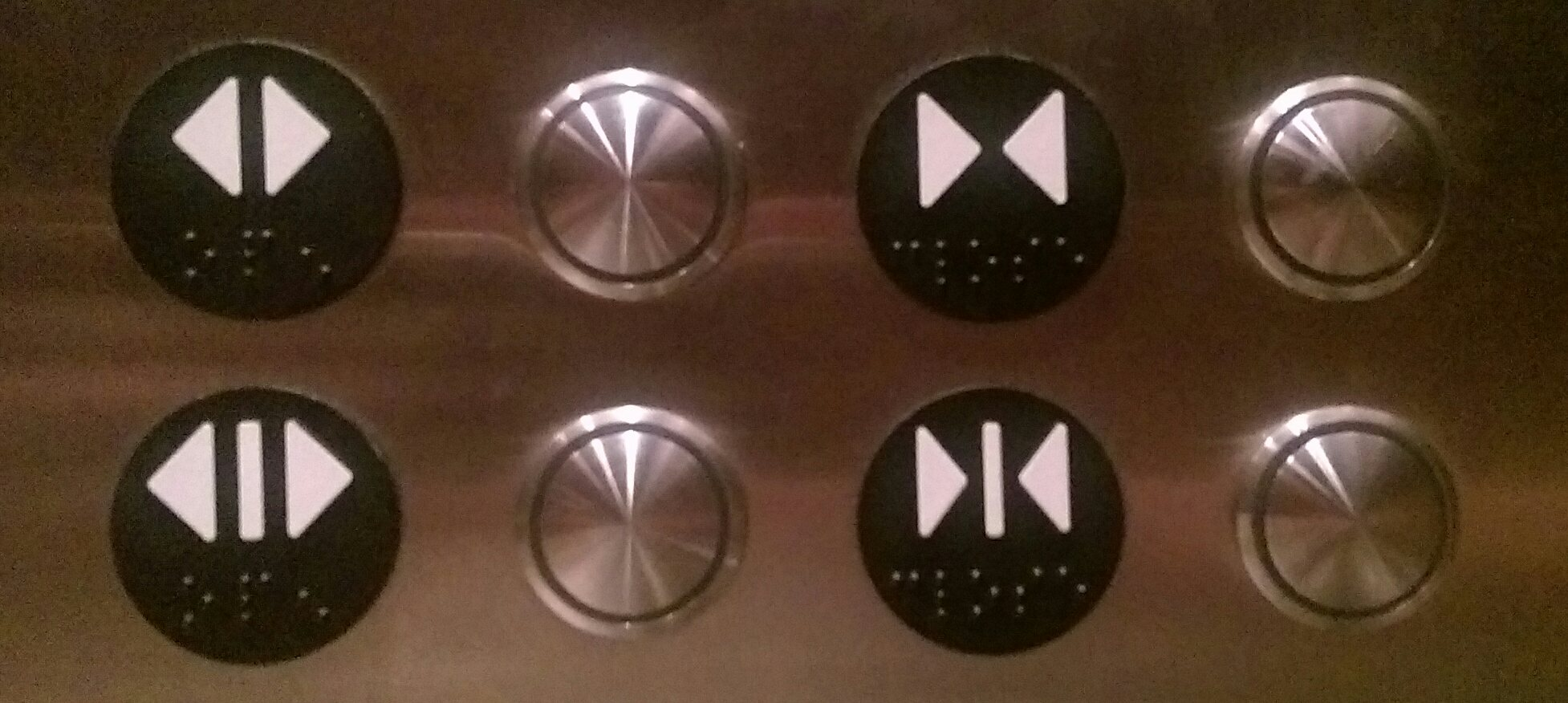
  - Dual door open and door close buttons, in an elevator with two sets of doors, found on a ThyssenKrupp elevator from the 2010s
    In case of dual doors, there may be two sets of door open and door close buttons, with one pair controlling the front doors, from the perspective of the console, typically denoted <> and ><, with the other pair controlling the rear doors, typically denoted with a line in the middle, <|> and >|<, or double lines, |<>| and >||<. This second set is required in the US if both doors can be opened at the same landing, so that the doors can both be controlled in independent service.
- Security camera
- Plain walls or mirrored walls
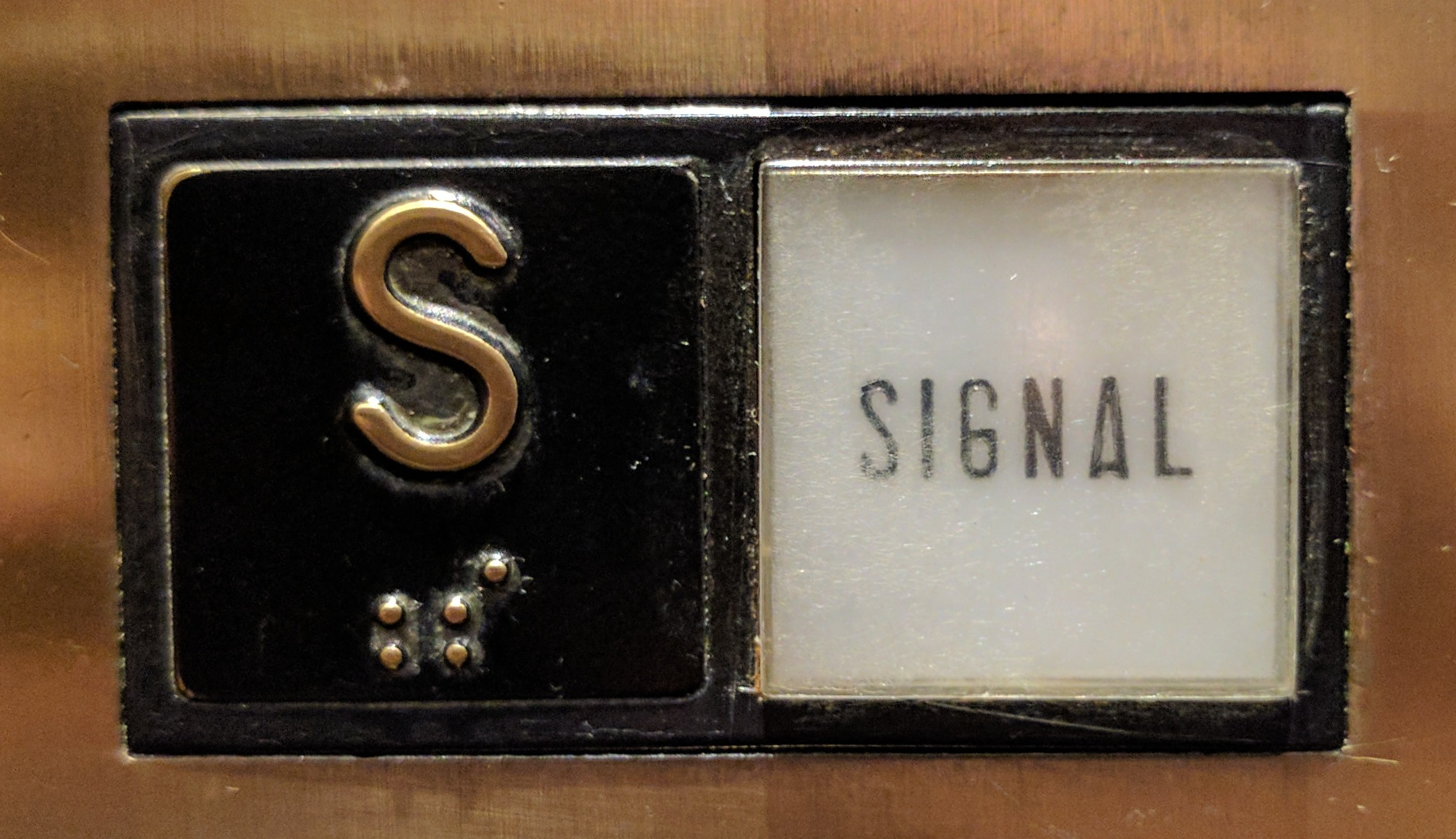
- 'S' "Signal" button, found in US elevators of 1991–2012 vintage
  Glass windowpane providing a view of the building interior or onto the streets

An audible signal button, labeled "S": in the US, for elevators installed between 1991 and 2012 (initial passage of ADA and coming into force of 2010 revision), a button which if pushed, sounds an audible signal as each floor is passed, to assist visually impaired passengers. This button is no longer used on new elevators, where the sound is normally obligatory.

Other controls, which are not available for the public (either because they are key switches, or because they are kept behind a locked panel), include:

- Fireman's service, phase II key switch
- Switch to enable or disable the elevator.
- An inspector's switch, which places the elevator in inspection mode (this may be situated on the top of the elevator)
- Manual up/down controls for elevator technicians, to be used in inspection mode, for example.
- An independent service/exclusive mode (also known as "car preference"), which will prevent the car from answering to hall calls and only arrive at floors selected via the panel. The door should stay open while parked on a floor. This mode may be used for temporarily transporting goods.
- Attendant service mode
- Large buildings with multiple elevators of this type also had an elevator dispatcher stationed in the lobby to direct passengers and to signal the operator to leave with the use of a mechanical "cricket" noisemaker.

=== External controls ===
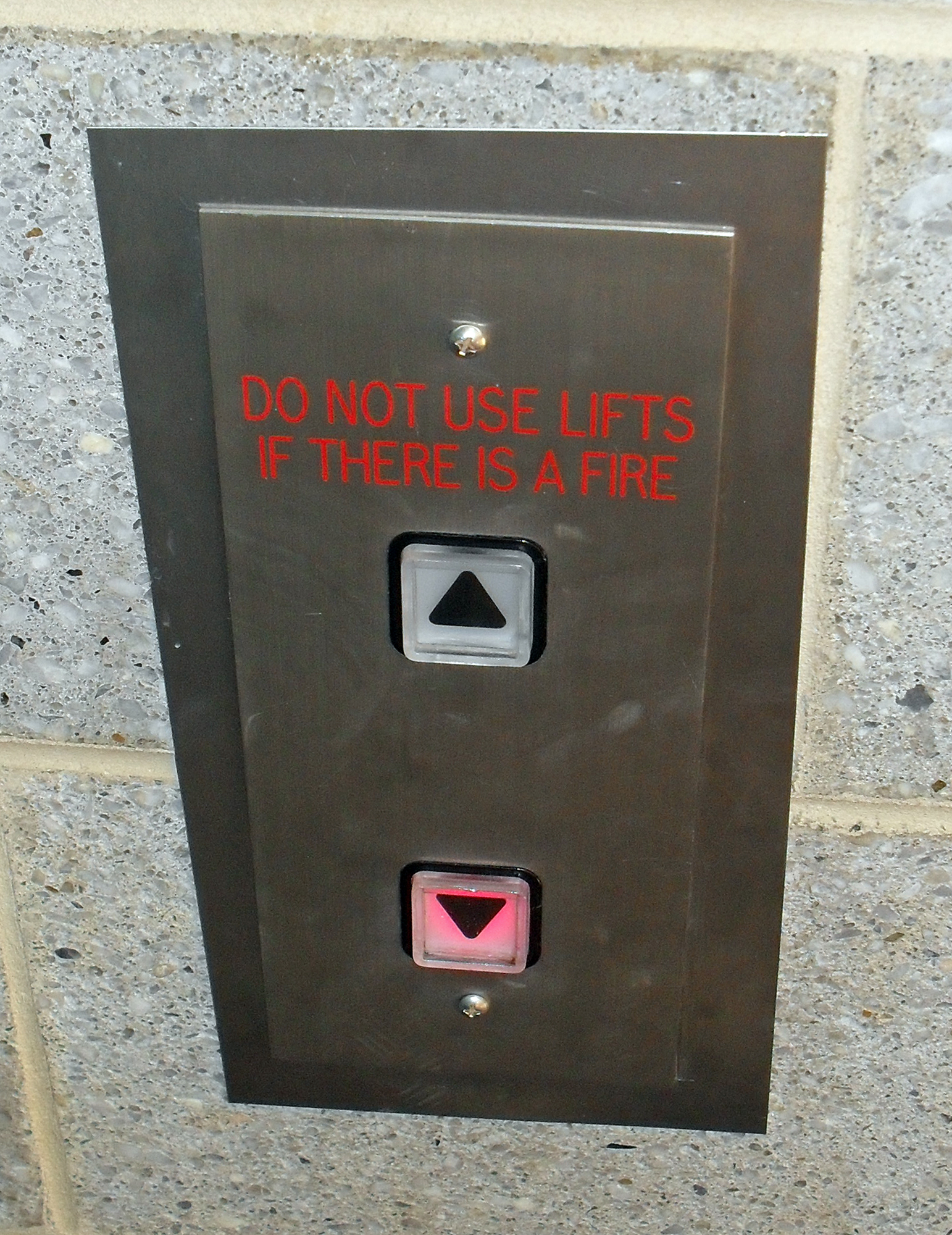
An external control panel

Elevators are typically controlled from the outside by a call box, which has up and down buttons, at each stop. When pressed at a certain floor, the button (also known as a "hall call" button) calls the elevator to pick up more passengers. If the particular elevator is currently serving traffic in a certain direction, it will only answer calls in the same direction unless there are no more calls beyond that floor.

In a group of two or more elevators, the call buttons may be linked to a central dispatch computer, such that they illuminate and cancel together. This is done to ensure that only one car is called at one time.

Key switches may be installed on the ground floor so that the elevator can be remotely switched on or off from the outside.

In destination control systems, one selects the intended destination floor (in lieu of pressing "up" or "down") and is then notified which elevator will serve their request.

=== Floor numbering ===
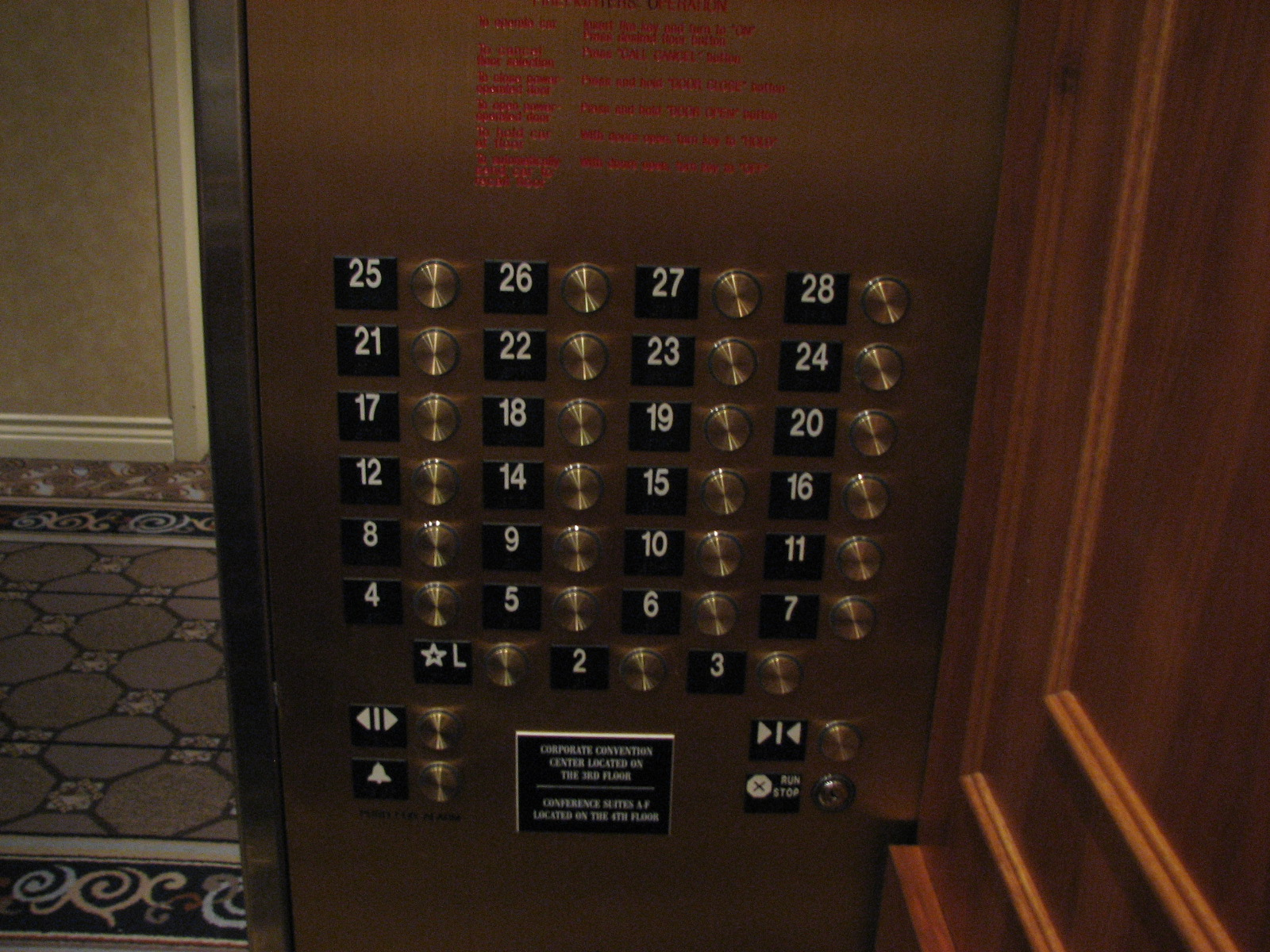
Elevator buttons showing the missing 13th floor

To distinguish between floors, the different landings are given numbers and sometimes letters. See the above article for more information.

=== Elevator algorithm ===
The elevator algorithm, a simple algorithm by which a single elevator can decide where to stop, is summarized as follows:

- Continue traveling in the same direction while there are remaining requests in that same direction.
- If there are no further requests in that direction, then stop and become idle, or change direction if there are requests in the opposite direction.

The elevator algorithm has found an application in computer operating systems as an algorithm for scheduling hard disk requests. Modern elevators use more complex heuristic algorithms to decide which request to service next. In taller buildings with high traffic, such as the New York Marriott Marquis or the Burj Khalifa, the destination dispatch algorithm is used to group passengers going to similar floors, maximizing load by up to 25%.

=== Destination control system ===
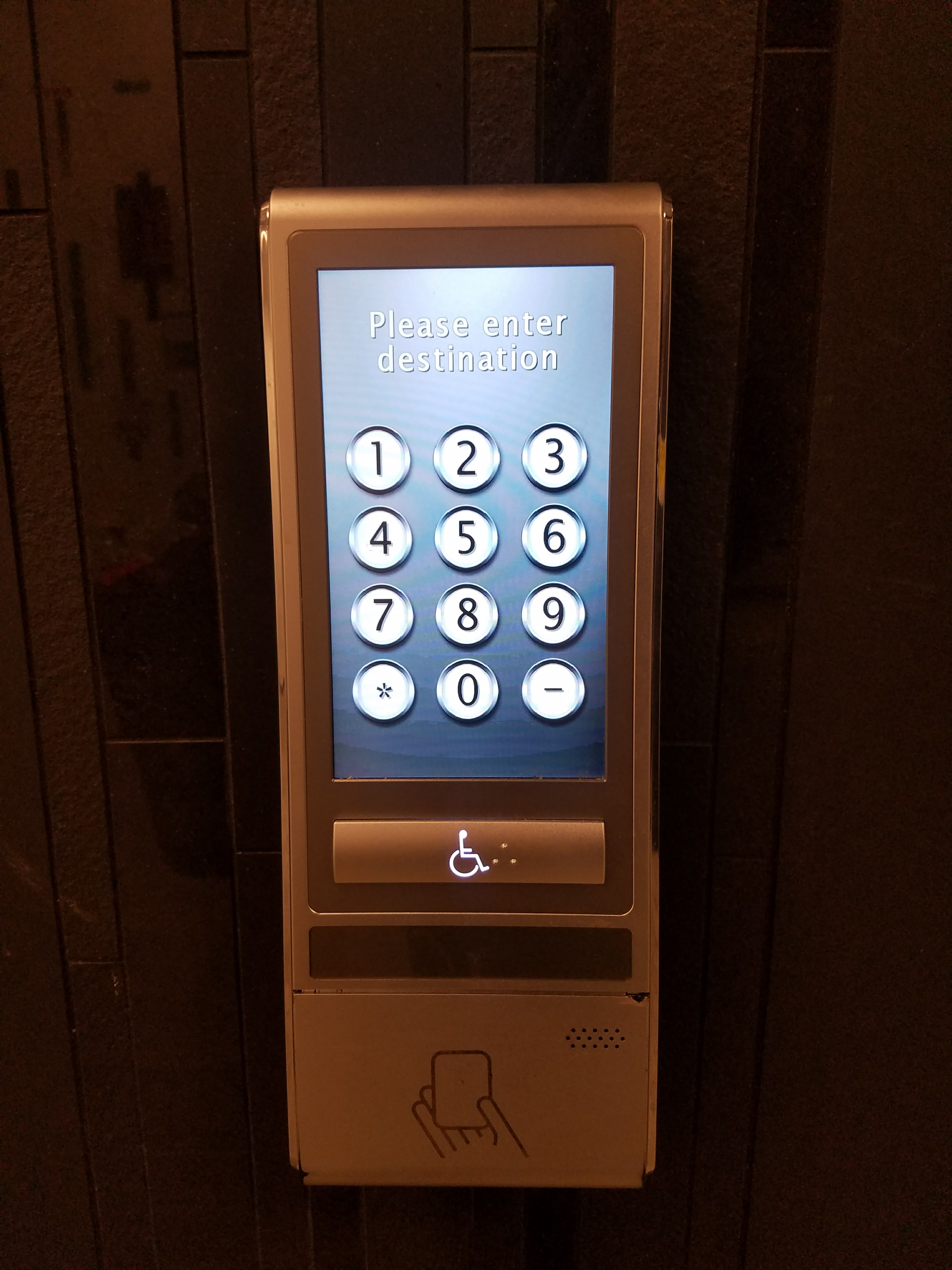
An Otis CompassPlus destination control elevator floor selection panel at Northeastern University in Boston, United States

Some skyscraper buildings and other types of installation feature a destination operating panel where a passenger registers their floor calls before entering the car. The system lets them know which car to wait for, instead of everyone boarding the next car. In this way, travel time is reduced as the elevator makes fewer stops for individual passengers, and the computer distributes adjacent stops to different cars in the bank. Although travel time is reduced, passenger waiting times may be longer as they will not necessarily be allocated the next car to depart. During the down peak period the benefit of destination control will be limited as passengers have a common destination.

It can also improve accessibility, as a mobility-impaired passenger can move to their designated car in advance.

Inside the elevator there is no call button to push, or the buttons are there but they cannot be pushed—except door opening and alarm button—they only indicate stopping floors.

The idea of destination control was originally conceived by Leo Port from Sydney in 1961, but at that time elevator controllers were implemented in relays and were unable to optimize the performance of destination control allocations.

The system was first pioneered by Schindler Elevator in 1992 as the Miconic 10. Manufacturers of such systems claim that average traveling time can be reduced by up to 30%.

However, performance enhancements cannot be generalized as the benefits and limitations of the system are dependent on many factors. One problem is that the system is subject to gaming. Sometimes, one person enters the destination for a large group of people going to the same floor. The dispatching algorithm is usually unable to completely cater for the variation, and latecomers may find the elevator they are assigned to is already full. Also, occasionally, one person may press the floor multiple times. This is common with up/down buttons when people believe this to be an effective way to hurry elevators. However, this will make the computer think multiple people are waiting and will allocate empty cars to serve this one person.

To prevent this problem, in one implementation of destination control, every user is given an RFID card, for identification and tracking, so that the system knows every user call and can cancel the first call if the passenger decides to travel to another destination, preventing empty calls. The newest invention knows even where people are located and how many on which floor because of their identification, either for the purposes of evacuating the building or for security reasons. Another way to prevent this issue is to treat everyone traveling from one floor to another as one group and to allocate only one car for that group.

The same destination scheduling concept can also be applied to public transit such as in group rapid transit.

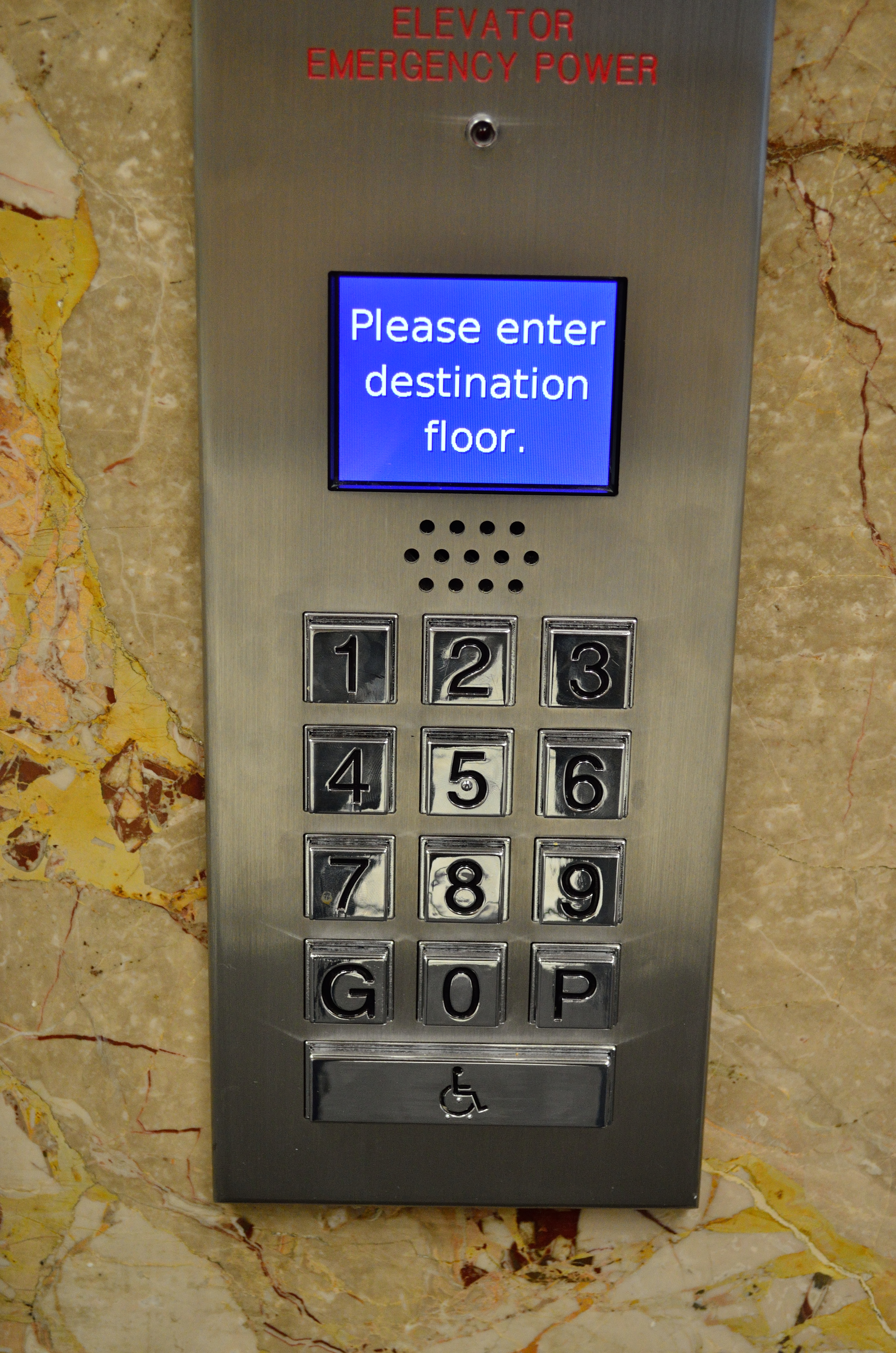
An Otis Compass destination dispatch control station, outside of the car, on which the user presses a button to indicate the desired destination floor, and the panel indicates which car will be dispatched

== Special operating modes ==
=== Anti-crime protection ===
The anti-crime protection (ACP) feature will force each car to stop at a pre-defined landing and open its doors. This allows a security guard or a receptionist at the landing to visually inspect the passengers. The car stops at this landing as it passes to serve further demand.

=== Up-peak ===
During up-peak mode (also called moderate incoming traffic), elevator cars in a group are recalled to the lobby to provide expeditious service to passengers arriving at the building, most typically in the morning as people arrive for work or at the conclusion of a lunch-time period when people are going back to work. Elevators are dispatched one-by-one when they reach a pre-determined passenger load, or when they have had their doors opened for a certain period of time. The next elevator to be dispatched usually has its hall lantern or a "this car leaving next" sign illuminated to encourage passengers to make maximum use of the available elevator system capacity. Some elevator banks are programmed so that at least one car will always return to the lobby floor and park whenever it becomes free.

The commencement of up-peak may be triggered by a time clock, by the departure of a certain number of fully loaded cars leaving the lobby within a given time period, or by a switch manually operated by a building attendant.

=== Down-peak ===
During down-peak mode, elevator cars in a group are sent away from the lobby towards the highest floor served, after which they commence running down the floors in response to hall calls placed by passengers wishing to leave the building. This allows the elevator system to provide maximum passenger handling capacity for people leaving the building.

The commencement of down-peak may be triggered by a time clock, by the arrival of a certain number of fully loaded cars at the lobby within a given time period, or by a switch manually operated by a building attendant.

=== Sabbath service ===
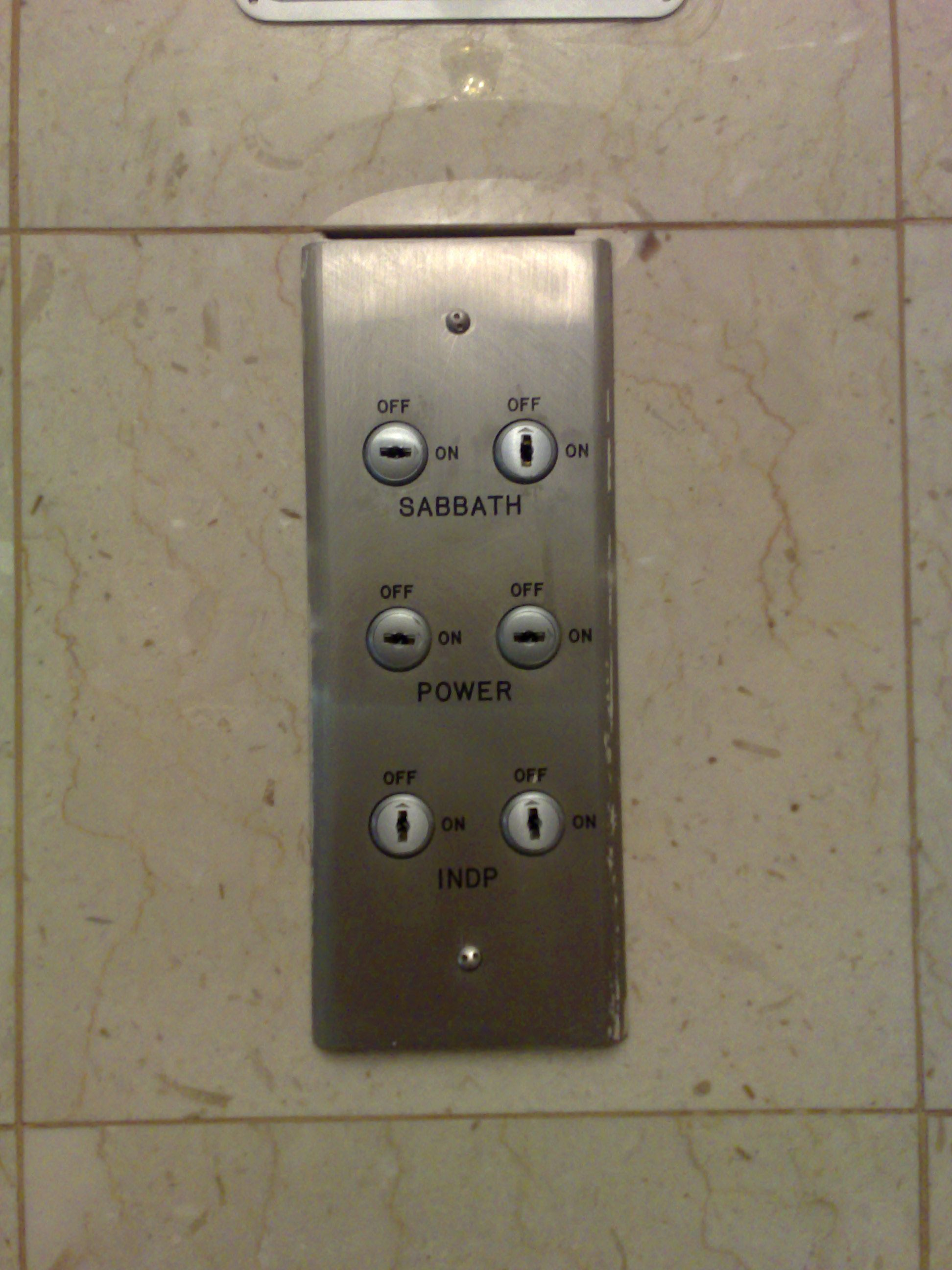
A switch to turn Sabbath elevator mode on or off

In areas with large populations of observant Jews or in facilities catering to Jews, one may find a "Sabbath elevator". In this mode, an elevator will stop automatically at every floor, allowing people to step on and off without having to push any buttons. This prevents violation of the Sabbath prohibition against operating electrical devices when Sabbath is in effect for those who observe this ritual.

However, Sabbath mode has the side effect of using considerable amounts of energy, running the elevator car sequentially up and down every floor of a building, repeatedly servicing floors where it is not needed. For a tall building with many floors, the car must move on a frequent enough basis so as to not cause undue delay for potential users that will not touch the controls as it opens the doors on every floor up the building.

=== Independent service ===
Independent service or car preference is a special mode found on most elevators. It is activated by a key switch either inside the elevator itself or on a centralized control panel in the lobby. When an elevator is placed on this mode, it will no longer respond to hall calls. (In a bank of elevators, traffic is rerouted to the other elevators, while in a single elevator, the hall buttons are disabled). The elevator will remain parked on a floor with its doors open until a floor is selected and the door close button is held until the elevator starts to travel. Independent service is useful when transporting large goods or moving groups of people between certain floors.

=== Inspection service ===
Inspection service is designed to provide access to the hoistway and car top for inspection and maintenance purposes by qualified elevator mechanics. It is first activated by a key switch on the car operating panel usually labeled 'Inspection', 'Car Top', 'Access Enable' or 'HWENAB' (short for HoistWay access ENABled). When this switch is activated the elevator will come to a stop if moving, car calls will be canceled (and the buttons disabled), and hall calls will be assigned to other elevator cars in the group (or canceled in a single elevator configuration). The elevator can now only be moved by the corresponding 'Access' key switches, usually located at the highest (to access the top of the car) and lowest (to access the elevator pit) landings. The access key switches will allow the car to move at reduced inspection speed with the hoistway door open. This speed can range from anywhere up to 60% of normal operating speed on most controllers, and is usually defined by local safety codes.

Elevators have a car top inspection station that allows the car to be operated by a mechanic in order to move it through the hoistway. Generally, there are three buttons: UP, RUN, and DOWN. Both the RUN and a direction button must be held to move the car in that direction, and the elevator will stop moving as soon as the buttons are released. Most other elevators have an up/down toggle switch and a RUN button. The inspection panel also has standard power outlets for work lamps and powered tools.

=== Fire service ===
Depending on the location of the elevator, fire service code will vary state to state and country to country. Fire service is usually split up into two modes: phase one and phase two. These are separate modes that the elevator can go into.

Phase one mode is activated by a corresponding smoke sensor, heat sensor, or manual key switch in the building. Once an alarm has been activated, the elevator will automatically go into phase one. The elevator will wait an amount of time, then proceed to go into nudging mode to tell everyone the elevator is leaving the floor. Once the elevator has left the floor, depending on where the alarm was set off, the elevator will go to the fire-recall floor. However, if the alarm was activated on the fire-recall floor, the elevator will have an alternate floor to recall to. When the elevator is recalled, it proceeds to the recall floor and stops with its doors open. The elevator will no longer respond to calls or move in any direction. Located on the fire-recall floor is a fire-service key switch. The fire-service key switch has the ability to turn fire service off, turn fire service on or bypass fire service. The only way to return the elevator to normal service is to switch it to bypass after the alarms have reset.

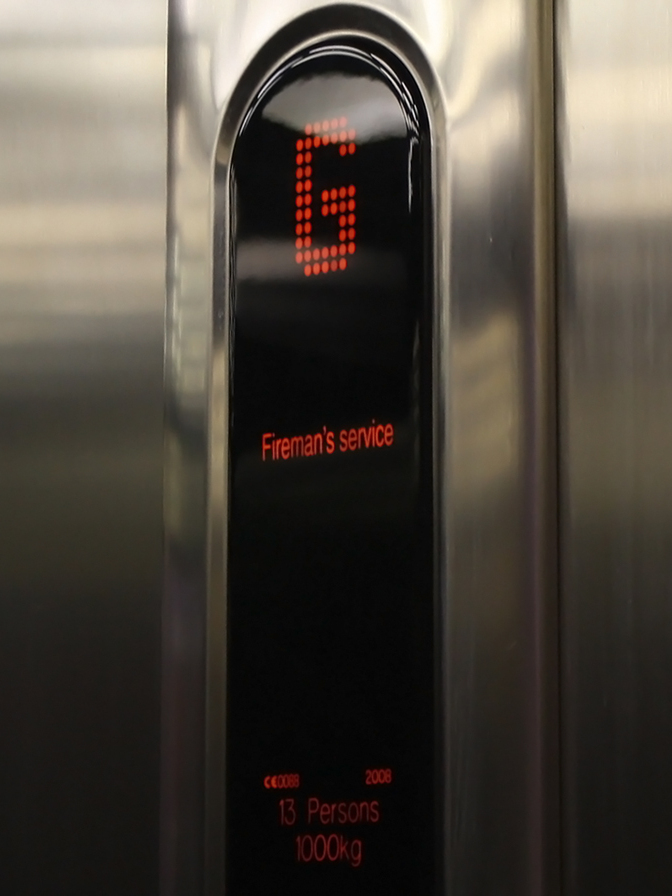
KONE Ecodisc elevator in the United Kingdom in fireman's service mode

Phase-two mode can only be activated by a key switch located inside the elevator on the car operating panel. This mode was created for firefighters so that they may rescue people from a burning building. The phase-two key switch has three positions: off, on, and hold. By turning phase two on, the firefighter enables the car to move. However, like independent-service mode, the car will not respond to a car call unless the firefighter manually pushes and holds the door close button. Once the elevator gets to the desired floor it will not open its doors unless the firefighter holds the door open button. This is in case the floor is burning and the firefighter can feel the heat and knows not to open the door. The firefighter must hold the door open button until the door is completely opened. If for any reason the firefighter wishes to leave the elevator, they will use the hold position on the key switch to make sure the elevator remains at that floor. If the firefighter wishes to return to the recall floor, they simply turn the key off and close the doors.

In the UK and Europe the requirements for firefighters lifts are defined in the standard EN81-72. ASME A17.1/CSA B44 is the primary U.S. safety code for elevators and escalators.

=== Medical emergency or code-blue service ===
Commonly found in hospitals, code-blue service allows an elevator to be summoned to any floor for use in an emergency situation. Each floor will have a code-blue recall key switch, and when activated, the elevator system will immediately select the elevator car that can respond the fastest, regardless of direction of travel and passenger load. Passengers inside the elevator will be notified with an alarm and indicator light to exit the elevator when the doors open.

Once the elevator arrives at the floor, it will park with its doors open and the car buttons will be disabled to prevent a passenger from taking control of the elevator. Medical personnel must then activate the code-blue key switch inside the car, select their floor and close the doors with the door close button. The elevator will then travel non-stop to the selected floor, and will remain in code-blue service until switched off in the car. Some hospital elevators will feature a 'hold' position on the code-blue key switch (similar to fire service) which allows the elevator to remain at a floor locked out of service until code blue is deactivated.

=== Riot mode ===
In the event of civil disturbance, insurrection, or rioting, management can prevent elevators from stopping at the lobby or parking areas, preventing undesired persons from using the elevators while still allowing the building tenants to use them within the rest of the building.

=== Emergency power operation ===
Many elevator installations now feature emergency power systems such as uninterruptible power supply (UPS) which allow elevator use in blackout situations and prevent people from becoming trapped in elevators. To be compliant with BS 9999 safety standards, a passenger lift being used in an emergency situation must have a secondary source of power.

Where a generator is being used as the secondary power supply in a hospital, a UPS must also be present to meet regulations stating that healthcare facilities must test their emergency generators under load at least once per month. During the test period only one supply of power is feeding the lift, in a blackout situation without a UPS, the lifts would not be operational.

==== Traction elevators ====
When power is lost in a traction elevator system, all elevators will initially come to a halt. One by one, each car in the group will return to the lobby floor, open its doors, and shut down. People in the remaining elevators may see an indicator light or hear a voice announcement informing them that the elevator will return to the lobby shortly. Once all cars have successfully returned, the system will then automatically select one or more cars to be used for normal operations and these cars will return to service. The car(s) selected to run under emergency power can be manually over-ridden by a key or strip switch in the lobby. To help prevent entrapment, when the system detects that it is running low on power, it will bring the running cars to the lobby or nearest floor, open the doors, and shut down.

==== Hydraulic elevators ====
In hydraulic elevator systems, emergency power will lower the elevators to the lowest landing and open the doors to allow passengers to exit. The doors then close after an adjustable time period and the car remains unusable until reset, usually by cycling the elevator main power switch. Typically, due to the high current draw when starting the pump motor, hydraulic elevators are not run using standard emergency power systems. Buildings like hospitals and nursing homes usually size their emergency generators to accommodate this draw. However, the increasing use of current-limiting motor starters, commonly known as "soft-start" contactors, avoids much of this problem, and the current draw of the pump motor is less of a limiting concern.

== Modernization ==
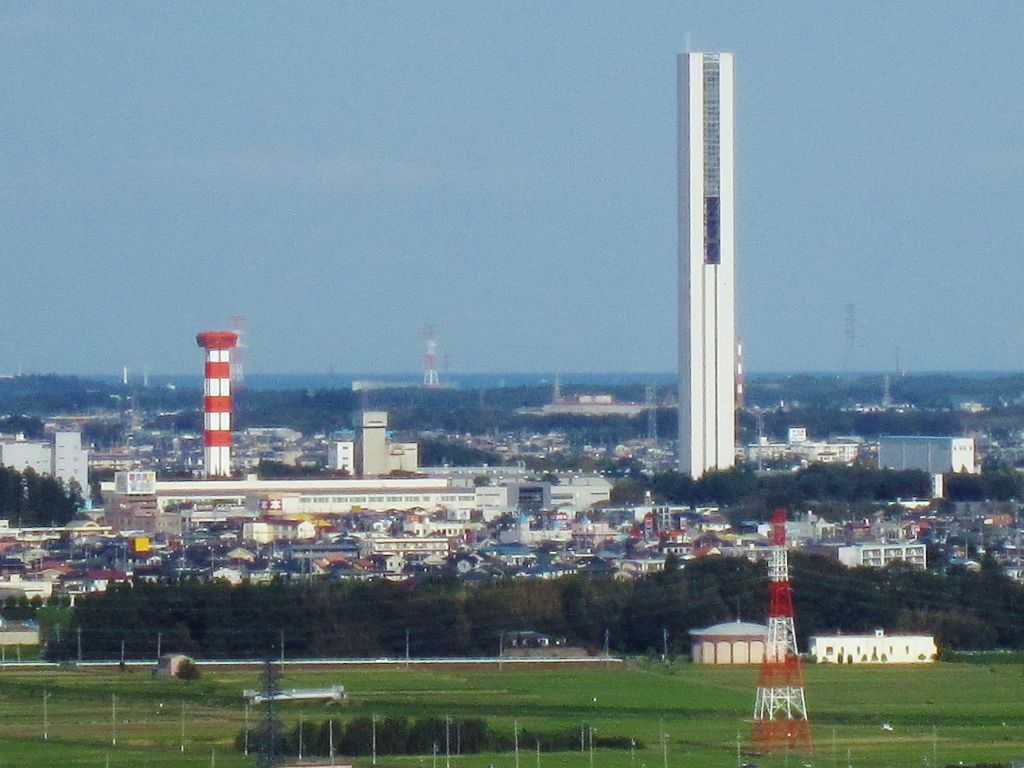
An elevator test tower in Japan

Most elevators are built to provide about 30 to 40 years of service, as long as service intervals specified and periodic maintenance/inspections by the manufacturer are followed. As the elevator ages and equipment become increasingly difficult to find or replace, along with code changes and deteriorating ride performance, a complete overhaul of the elevator may be suggested to the building owners.

A typical modernization consists of controller equipment, electrical wiring and buttons, position indicators and direction arrows, hoist machines and motors (including door operators), and sometimes door hanger tracks. Rarely are car slings, rails, or other heavy structures changed. The cost of an elevator modernization can range greatly depending on which type of equipment is to be installed.

Modernization can greatly improve operational reliability by replacing electrical relays and contacts with solid-state electronics. Ride quality can be improved by replacing motor-generator-based drive designs with Variable-Voltage, Variable Frequency (V3F) drives, providing near-seamless acceleration and deceleration. Passenger safety is also improved by updating systems and equipment to conform to current codes.

== Safety ==
On 26 February 2014, the European Union released their adoption of safety standards through a directive notification.

=== Traction elevators ===
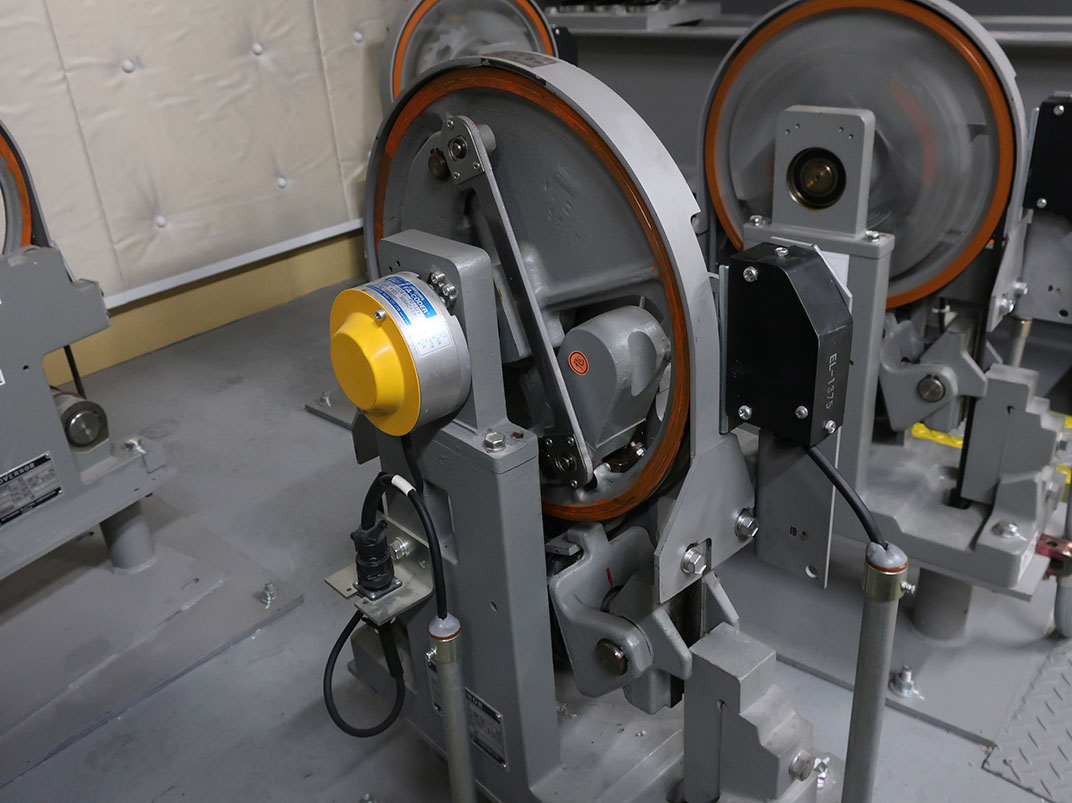
An overspeed governor

Statistically speaking, traction elevators are extremely safe. Of the 20 to 30 elevator-related deaths each year, most of them are maintenance-related—for example, technicians leaning too far into the shaft or getting caught between moving parts, and most of the rest are attributed to other kinds of accidents, such as people stepping blindly through doors that open into empty shafts or being strangled by scarves caught in the doors. While it is possible (though extraordinarily unlikely) for an elevator's cable to snap, all elevators in the modern era have been fitted with several safety devices which prevent the elevator from simply free-falling and crashing. An elevator cab is typically borne by 2 to 6 (up to 12 or more in high rise installations) redundant hoist cables or belts, each of which is capable on its own of supporting the rated load of the elevator plus twenty-five percent more weight. In addition, there is a device which detects whether the elevator is descending faster than its maximum designed speed; if this happens, the device causes copper (or silicon nitride ceramic in high rise installations) brake shoes to clamp down along the vertical rails in the shaft, stopping the elevator quickly, but not so abruptly as to cause injury. This device, called the governor, was invented by Elisha Graves Otis. For example, in 2007 an elevator at a Seattle children's hospital experienced cable failure, causing it to free-fall until its governor engaged. In addition, an oil/hydraulic or spring or polyurethane or telescopic oil/hydraulic buffer or a combination (depending on the travel height and travel speed) is installed at the bottom of the shaft (or in the bottom of the cab and sometimes also in the top of the cab or shaft) to somewhat cushion any impact. Lethal accidents do occur, however: in 1989, seven people were killed at a hospital in L'Hospitalet, Spain, when the pulleys connecting the cables to the elevator cabin broke loose and the safety mechanism failed to activate, causing the elevator to plunge seven stories to the ground. A similar accident occurred in 2019 in Santos, Brazil, killing four.

=== Hydraulic elevators ===
Past problems with hydraulic elevators include underground electrolytic destruction of the cylinder and bulkhead, pipe failures, and control failures. Single bulkhead cylinders, typically built prior to a 1972 ASME A17.1 Elevator Safety Code change requiring a second dished bulkhead, were subject to possible catastrophic failure. The code previously permitted only single-bottom hydraulic cylinders. In the event of a cylinder breach, the fluid loss results in uncontrolled down movement of the elevator. This creates two significant hazards: being subject to an impact at the bottom when the elevator stops suddenly and being in the entrance for a potential shear if the rider is partly in the elevator. Because it is impossible to verify the system at all times, the code requires periodic testing of the pressure capability. Another solution to protect against a cylinder blowout is to install a plunger gripping device. Two commercially available are known by the marketing names "LifeJacket" and "HydroBrake". The plunger gripper is a device which, in the event of an uncontrolled downward acceleration, nondestructively grips the plunger and stops the car. A device known as an overspeed or rupture valve is attached to the hydraulic inlet/outlet of the cylinder and is adjusted for a maximum flow rate. If a pipe or hose were to break (rupture), the flow rate of the rupture valve will surpass a set limit and mechanically stop the outlet flow of hydraulic fluid, thus stopping the plunger and the car in the down direction.

In addition to the safety concerns for older hydraulic elevators, there is risk of leaking hydraulic oil into the aquifer and causing potential environmental contamination. This has led to the introduction of PVC liners (casings) around hydraulic cylinders which can be monitored for integrity.

In the past decade, recent innovations in inverted hydraulic jacks have eliminated the costly process of drilling the ground to install a borehole jack. This also eliminates the threat of corrosion to the system and increases safety.

=== Mine-shaft elevators ===
Safety testing of mine shaft elevator rails is routinely undertaken. The method involves destructive testing of a segment of the cable. The ends of the segment are frayed, then set in conical zinc molds. Each end of the segment is then secured in a large, hydraulic stretching machine. The segment is then placed under increasing load to the point of failure. Data about elasticity, load, and other factors is compiled and a report is produced. The report is then analyzed to determine whether or not the entire rail is safe to use.

== Uses ==
=== Passenger service ===
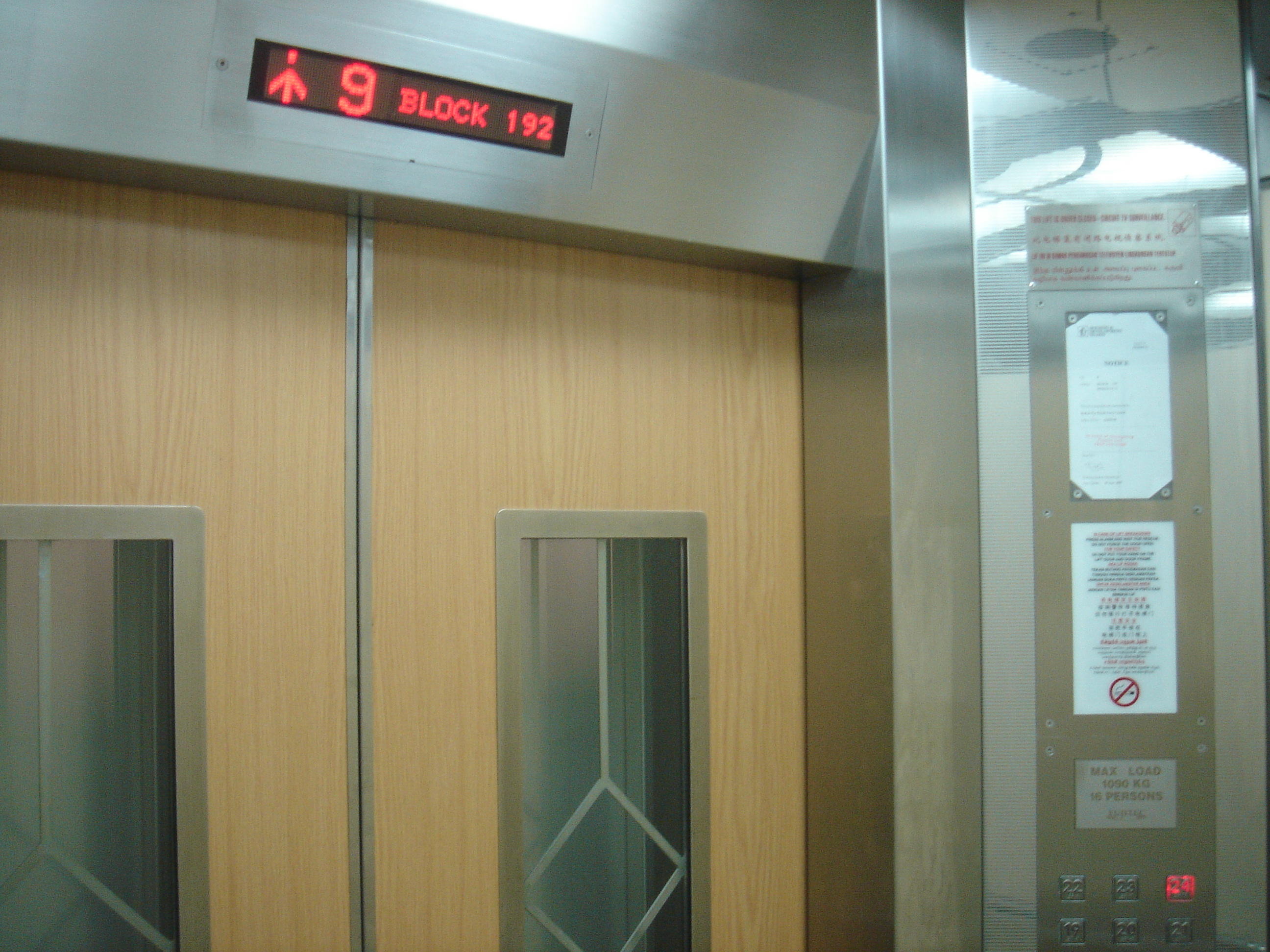
A Fujitec traction elevator in Block 192, Bishan, Singapore

A passenger elevator is designed to move people between a building's floors.

Passenger elevators capacity is related to the available floor space. Generally passenger elevators in buildings of eight floors or fewer are hydraulic or electric, which can reach speeds up to 1 m/s (200 ft/min) hydraulic and up to 3 m/s (500 ft/min) electric.

Sometimes passenger elevators are used as a city transport along with funiculars. For example, there is a three-station underground public elevator in Yalta, Ukraine, which takes passengers from the top of a hill above the Black Sea on which hotels are perched, to a tunnel located on the beach below. At Casco Viejo station in the Bilbao Metro, the elevator that provides access to the station from a hilltop neighborhood doubles as city transportation: the station's ticket barriers are set up in such a way that passengers can pay to reach the elevator from the entrance in the lower city, or vice versa.

==== Types of passenger elevators ====
The former World Trade Center's twin towers used skylobbies, located on the 44th and 78th floors of each tower.

Passenger elevators may be specialized for the service they perform, including: hospital emergency (code blue), front and rear entrances, a television in high-rise buildings, double-decker, and other uses. Cars may be ornate in their interior appearance, may have audio visual advertising, and may be provided with specialized recorded voice announcements. Elevators may also have loudspeakers in them to play calm, easy listening music. Such music is often referred to as elevator music.

An express elevator does not serve all floors. For example, it moves between the ground floor and a skylobby, or it moves from the ground floor or a skylobby to a range of floors, skipping floors in between.

==== Capacity ====
Residential elevators may be small enough to only accommodate one person while some are large enough for more than a dozen. Wheelchair, or platform elevators, a specialized type of elevator designed to move a wheelchair 3.7 m (12 ft) or less, can often accommodate just one person in a wheelchair at a time with a load of 340 kg (750 lb).

=== Freight elevators ===
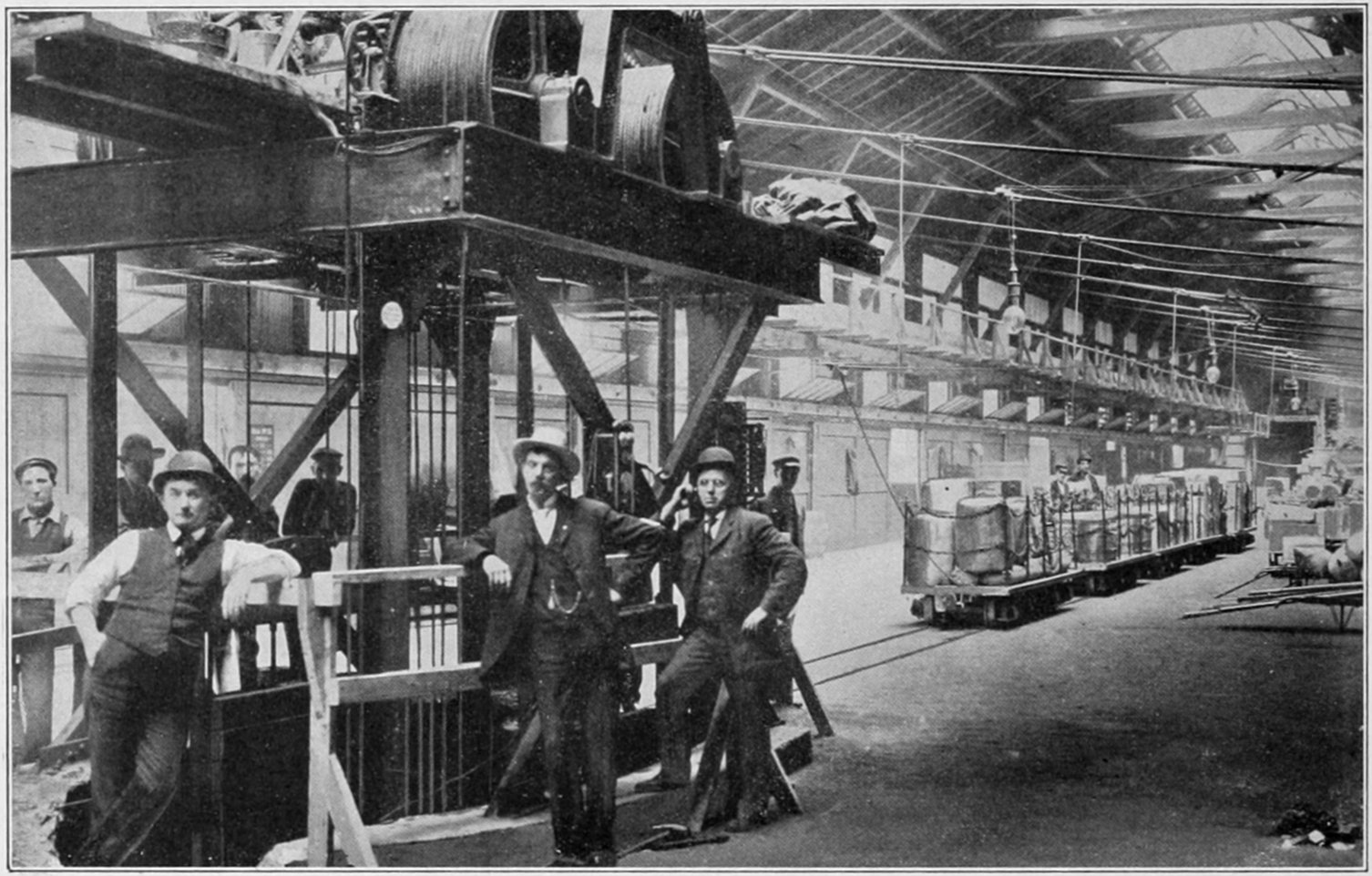
A specialized elevator from 1905 for lifting narrow gauge railroad cars between a railroad freight house and the Chicago Tunnel Company tracks below

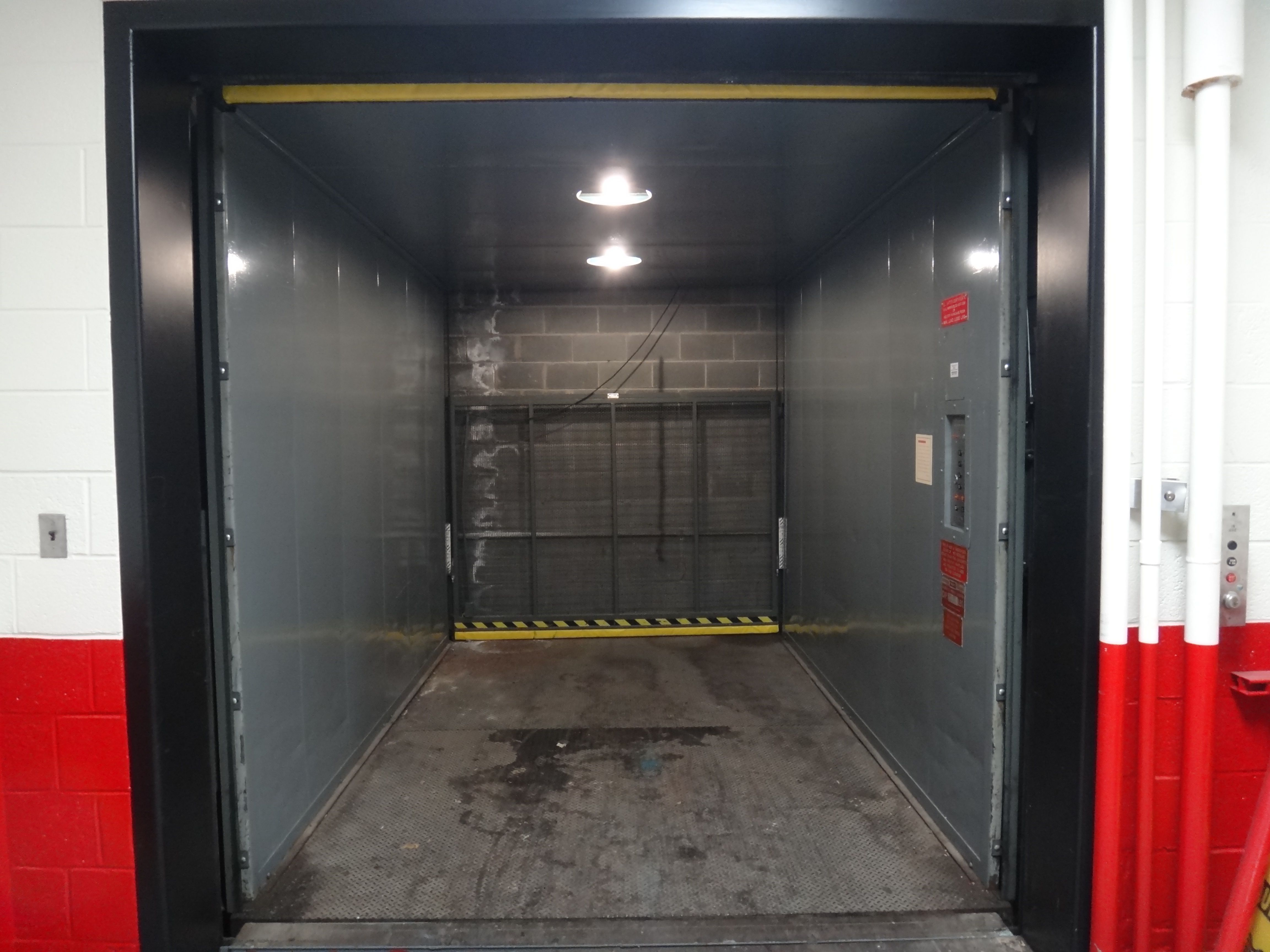
The interior of a freight elevator, shown on a college campus in North Carolina. It is very basic yet rugged for freight loading.

A freight elevator, or goods lift, is an elevator designed to carry goods, rather than passengers. Freight elevators are generally required to display a written notice in the car that the use by passengers is prohibited (though not necessarily illegal), though certain freight elevators allow dual use through the use of an inconspicuous riser. In order for an elevator to be legal to carry passengers in some jurisdictions it must have a solid inner door. Freight elevators are typically larger and capable of carrying heavier loads than a passenger elevator, generally from 2,300 to 4,500 kg (5,100 to 9,900 lb). Freight elevators may have manually operated doors, and often have rugged interior finishes to prevent damage while loading and unloading. In North America, it is common for freight elevators to have vertically opening doors the entire width of the cab.

=== Sidewalk elevators ===
A sidewalk elevator is a special type of freight elevator. Sidewalk elevators are used to move materials between a basement and a ground-level area, often the sidewalk just outside the building. They are controlled via an exterior switch and emerge from a metal trap door at ground level. Sidewalk elevator cars feature a uniquely shaped top that allows this door to open and close automatically.

=== Stage lifts ===
Stage lifts and orchestra lifts are specialized elevators, typically powered by hydraulics, that are used to raise and lower entire sections of a theater stage. For example, Radio City Music Hall has four such elevators: an orchestra lift that covers a large area of the stage, and three smaller lifts near the rear of the stage. In this case, the orchestra lift is powerful enough to raise an entire orchestra, or an entire cast of performers (including live elephants) up to stage level from below. There is a barrel on the background of the image of the left which can be used as a scale to represent the size of the mechanism

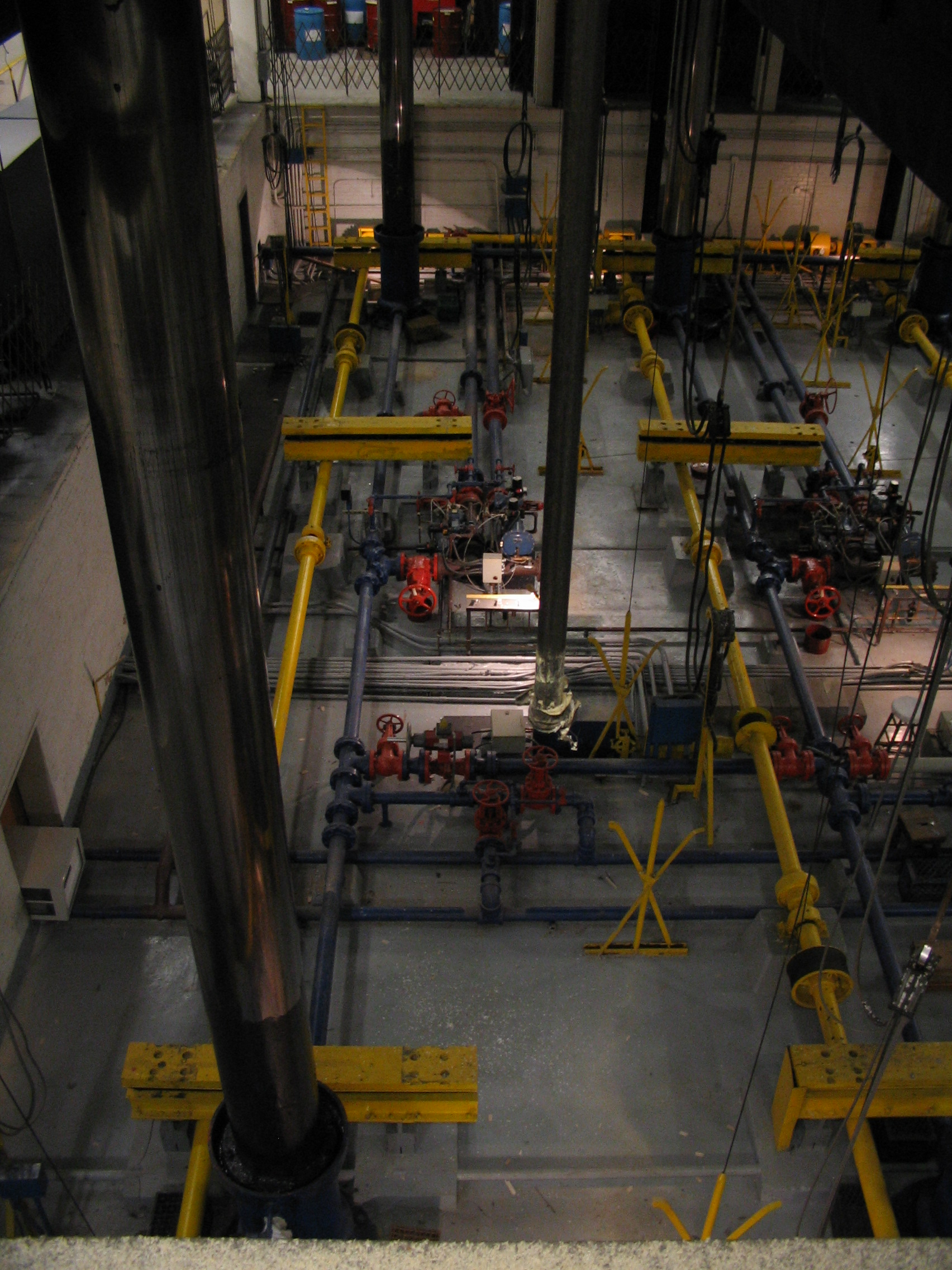
The pit beneath the orchestra lift at Radio City Music Hall

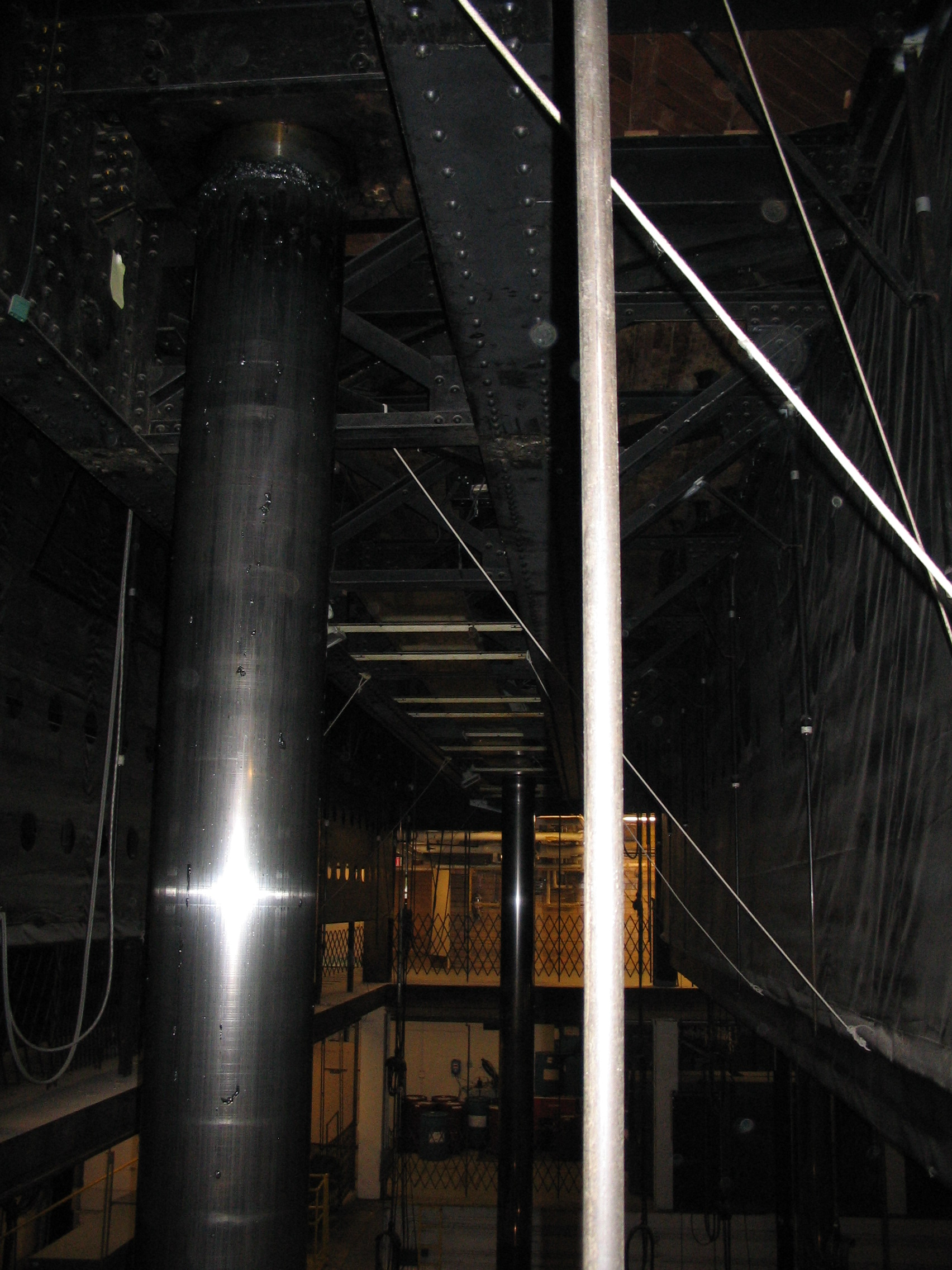
Orchestra lift at Radio City Music Hall as viewed from beneath the stage

=== Vehicle elevators ===
Vehicular elevators are used within buildings or areas with limited space (in place of ramps), generally to move cars into the parking garage or manufacturer's storage. Geared hydraulic chains (not unlike bicycle chains) generate lift for the platform and there are no counterweights. To accommodate building designs and improve accessibility, the platform may rotate so that the driver only has to drive forward. Most vehicle elevators have a weight capacity of 2 tons.

Rare examples of extra-heavy elevators for 20-ton lorries, and even for railcars (like one that was used at Dnipro Station of the Kyiv Metro) also occur.

=== Boat lift ===
In some smaller canals, boats and small ships can pass between different levels of a canal with a boat elevator rather than through a canal lock.

=== Aircraft elevators ===
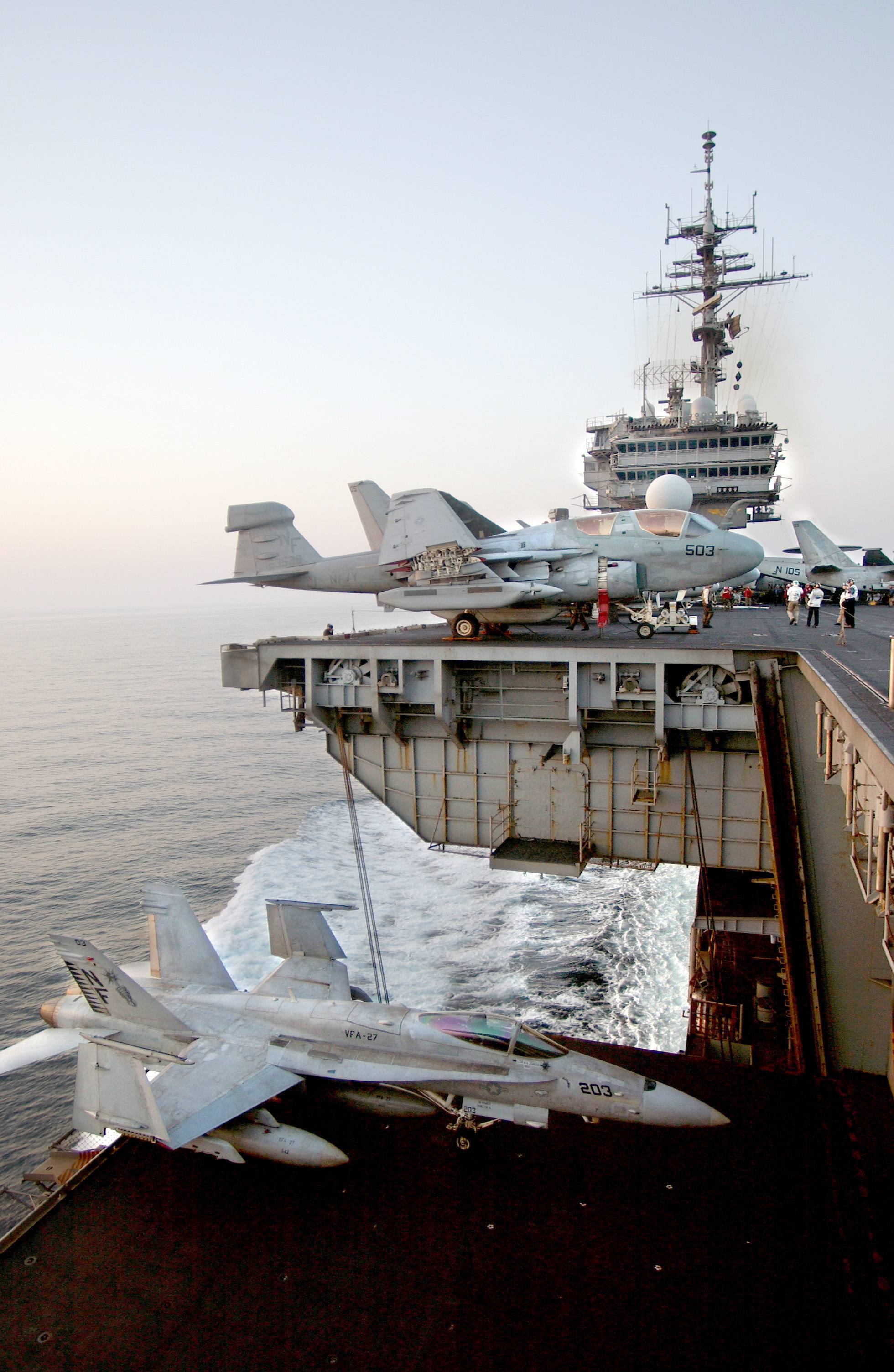
An F/A-18C on an aircraft elevator of USS Kitty Hawk

==== For aircraft ====
On aircraft carriers, elevators carry aircraft between the flight deck and the hangar deck for operations or repairs. These elevators are designed for much greater capacity than other elevators, up to 91,000 kg (200,000 lb) of aircraft and equipment. Smaller elevators lift munitions to the flight deck from magazines deep inside the ship.

==== Within aircraft ====
On some passenger double-deck aircraft such as the Boeing 747 or other widebody aircraft, elevators transport flight attendants and food and beverage trolleys from lower deck galleys to upper passenger carrying decks. Franklin Roosevelt had a retractable elevator installed on a Douglas C-54 Skymaster to allow him to board the aircraft in his wheelchair.

=== Limited use and limited application ===
The limited-use, limited-application (LU/LA) elevator is a special purpose passenger elevator used infrequently, and which is exempt from many commercial regulations and accommodations. For example, a LU/LA is primarily meant to be handicapped accessible, and there might only be room for a single wheelchair and a standing passenger. In North America, they are limited to a capacity of 1,400 pounds (640 kg) and travel of 25 feet (7.6 m).

=== Residential elevator ===
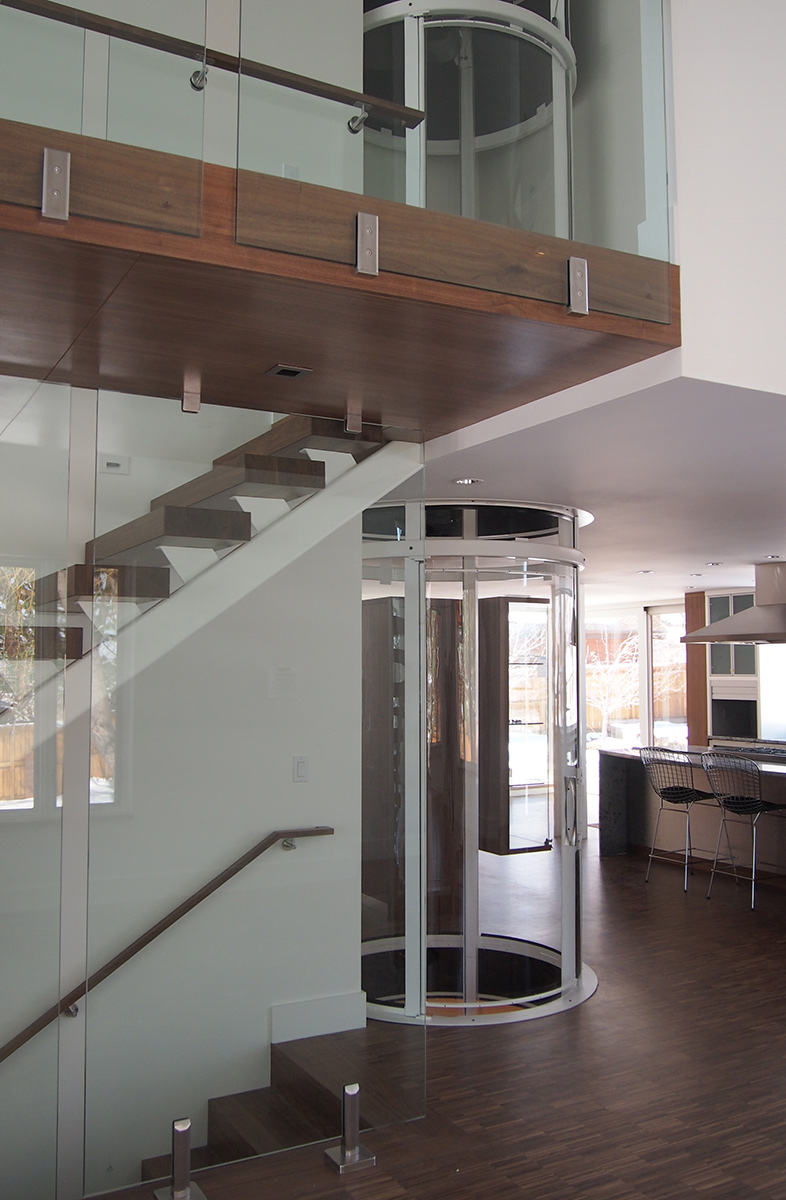
A residential elevator with integrated hoistway construction and machine-room-less design

A residential elevator or home lift is often permitted to be of lower cost and complexity than full commercial elevators. They may have unique design characteristics suited for home furnishings, such as hinged wooden shaft-access doors rather than the typical metal sliding doors of commercial elevators. Construction may be less robust than in commercial designs with shorter maintenance periods, but safety systems such as locks on shaft access doors, fall arrestors, and emergency phones must still be present in the event of malfunction.

The American Society of Mechanical Engineers (ASME) has a specific section of Safety Code (ASME A17.1 Section 5.3) which addresses Residential Elevators. This section allows for different parameters to alleviate design complexity based on the limited use of a residential elevator by a specific user or user group. Section 5.3 of the ASME A17.1 Safety Code is for Private Residence Elevators, which does not include multi-family dwellings.

Some types of residential elevators do not use a traditional elevator shaft, machine room, and elevator hoistway. This allows an elevator to be installed where a traditional elevator may not fit, and simplifies installation. The ASME board first approved machine-room-less systems in a revision of the ASME A17.1 in 2007. Machine-room-less elevators have been available commercially since the mid-1990s, however cost and overall size prevented their adoption to the residential elevator market until around 2010.

Also, residential elevators are smaller than commercial elevators. The smallest passenger elevator is pneumatic, and it allows for only 1 person. The smallest traction elevator allows for just 2 persons.

=== Dumbwaiter ===
Dumbwaiters are small freight elevators that are intended to carry food, books or other small freight loads rather than passengers. They often connect kitchens to rooms on other floors. They usually do not have the same safety features found in passenger elevators, like various ropes for redundancy. They have a lower capacity, and they can be up to 1 metre (3 ft) tall. Control panels at every stop mimic those found in passenger elevators, allowing calling, door control and floor selection.

=== Paternoster ===
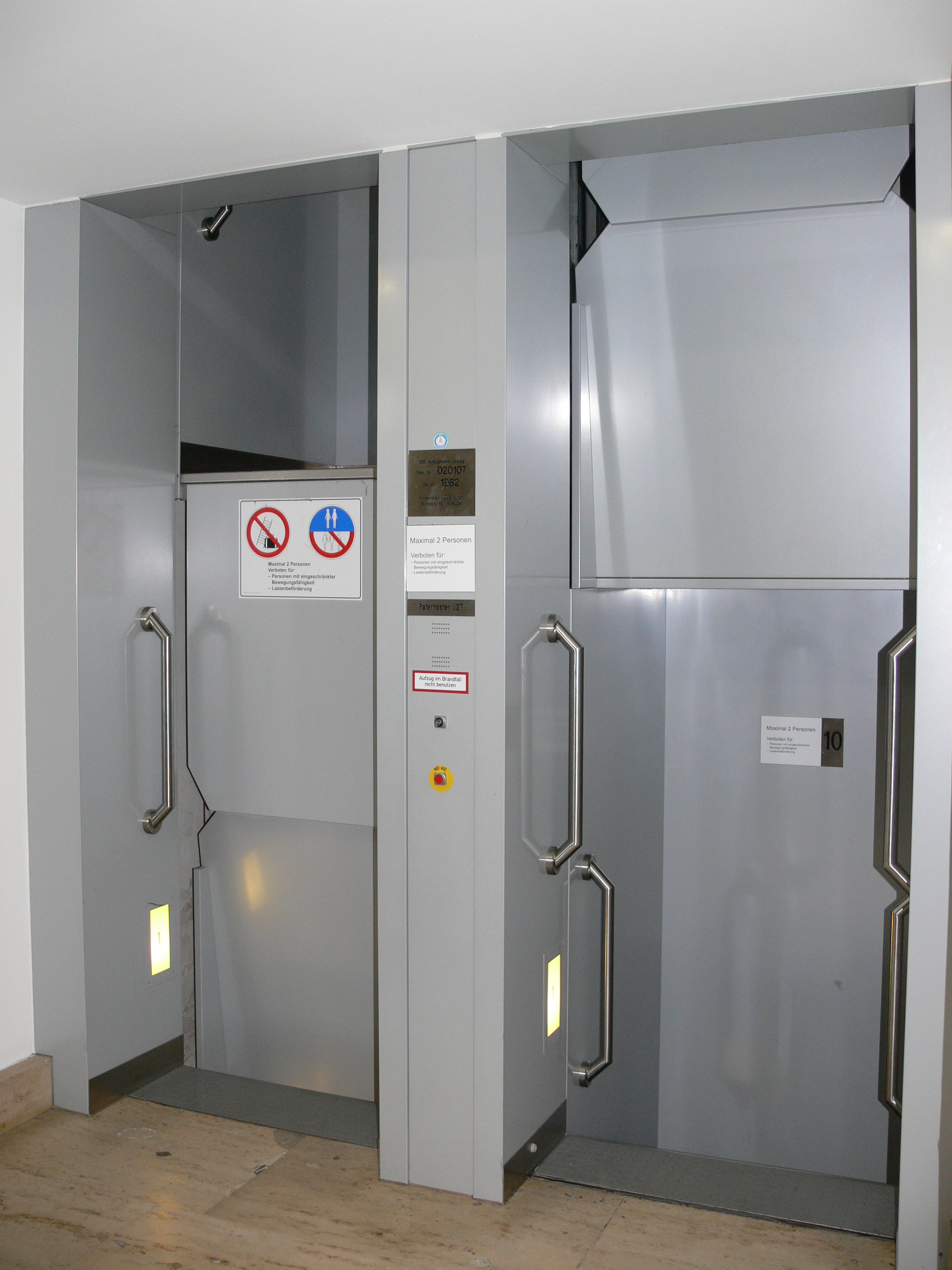
A paternoster in Berlin, Germany

A special type of elevator is the paternoster, a constantly moving chain of boxes that revolve on a track. A similar concept, called the manlift or humanlift, moves only a small platform, which the rider mounts while using a handhold seen in multi-story industrial plants.

=== Scissor lift ===
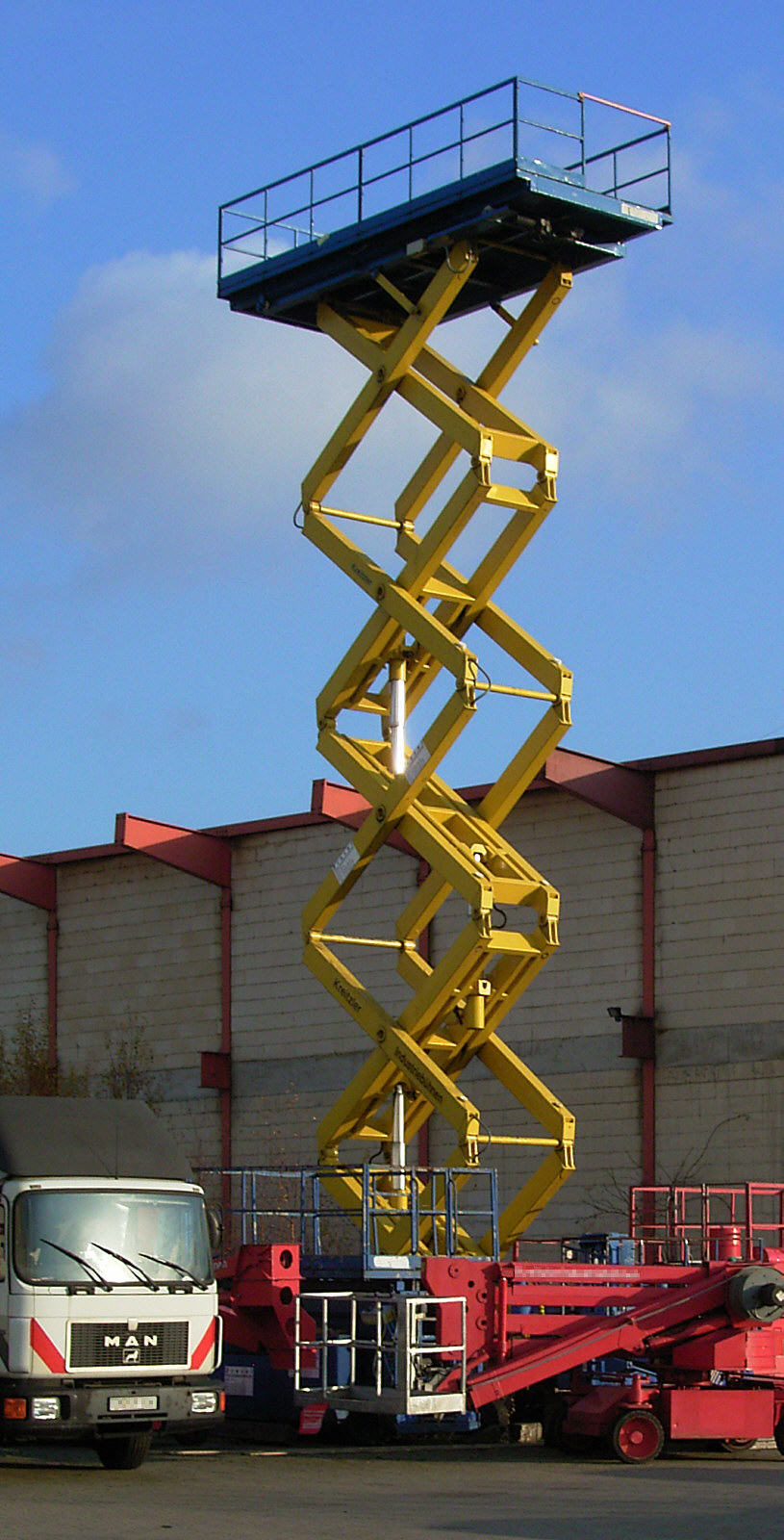
A mobile scissor lift, extended to near its highest position

The scissor lift is yet another type of elevator. These are usually mobile work platforms that can be easily moved to where they are needed, but can also be installed where space for counter-weights, machine room and so forth is limited. The mechanism that makes them go up and down is like that of a scissor jack.

=== Rack-and-pinion elevator ===
Rack-and-pinion elevator are powered by a motor driving a pinion gear. Because they can be installed on a building or structure's exterior and there is no machine room or hoistway required, they are the most used type of elevator for buildings under construction (to move materials and tools up and down).

=== Material handling belts and belt elevators ===
Material transport elevators generally consist of an inclined plane on which a conveyor belt runs. The conveyor often includes partitions to ensure that the material moves forward. These elevators are often used in industrial and agricultural applications. When such mechanisms (or spiral screws or pneumatic transport) are used to elevate grain for storage in large vertical silos, the entire structure is called a grain elevator. Belt elevators are often used in docks for loading loose materials such as coal, iron ore and grain into the holds of bulk carriers

There have occasionally been belt lifts for humans; these typically have steps about every 2 m (6 ft 6.7 in) along the length of the belt, which moves vertically, so that the passenger can stand on one step and hold on to the one above. These belts are sometimes used, for example, to carry the employees of parking garages, but are considered too dangerous for public use.

== Social impact ==
Before the widespread use of elevators, most residential buildings were limited to about seven stories. The wealthy lived on lower floors, while poorer residents—required to climb many flights of stairs—lived on higher floors. The elevator reversed this social stratification, exemplified by the modern penthouse suite.

Early users of elevators sometimes reported nausea caused by abrupt stops while descending, and some users would use stairs to go down. In 1894, a Chicago physician documented "elevator sickness".

Elevators necessitated new social protocols. When Nicholas II of Russia visited the Hotel Adlon in Berlin, his courtiers panicked about who would enter the elevator first, and who would press the buttons. In Lifted: A Cultural History of the Elevator, author Andreas Bernard documents other social impacts caused by the modern elevator, including thriller movies about stuck elevators, casual encounters and sexual tension on elevators, the reduction of personal space and claustrophobia, and concerns about personal hygiene.

== User interface ==
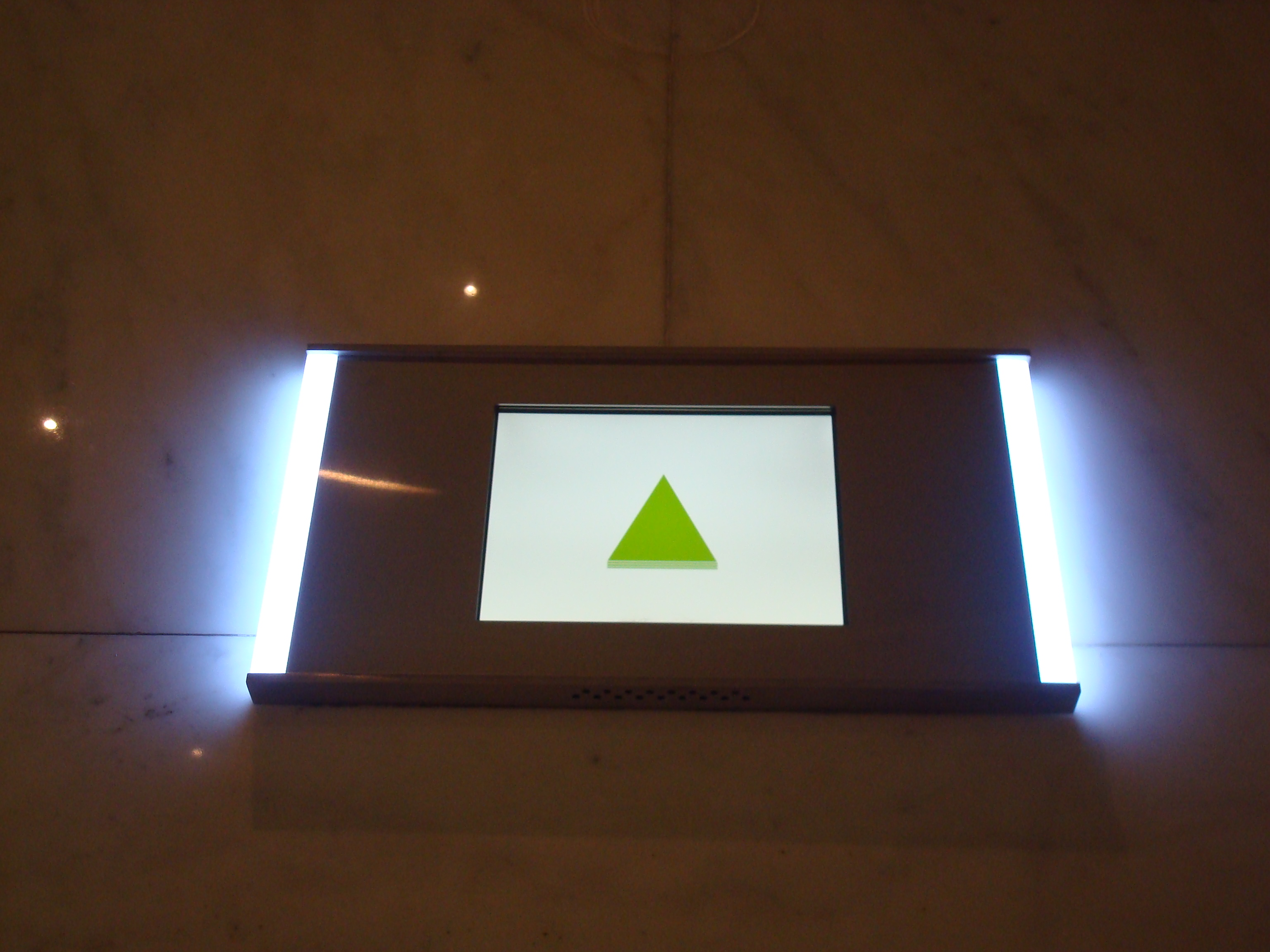
LCD elevator floor indicator

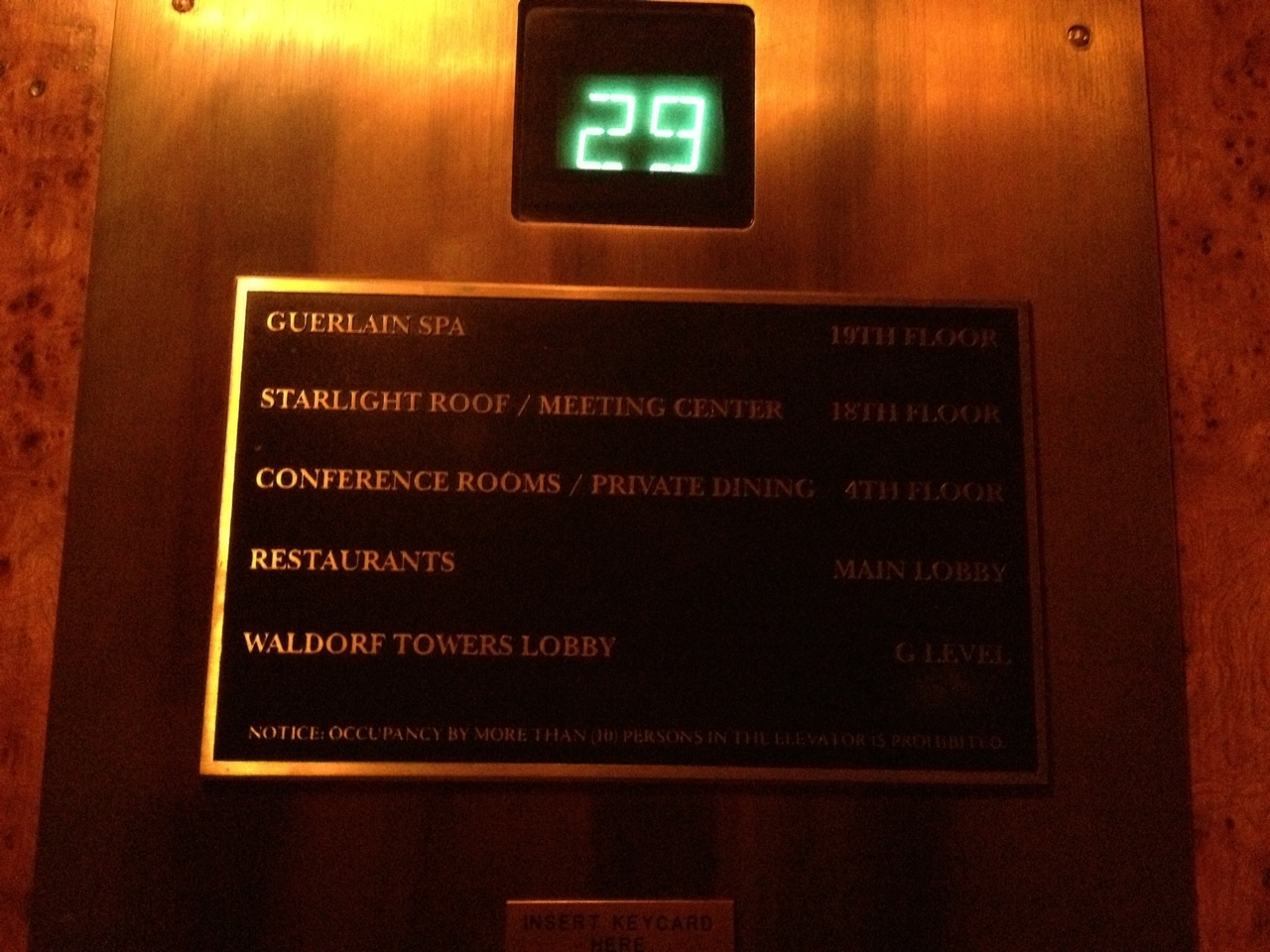
A typical elevator indicator located in the Waldorf Astoria New York. This elevator was made by Otis.

Elevators may feature talking devices as an accessibility aid for the blind. Since the early 1980s, some elevators feature voice synthesis to announce floor landings, car direction and special messages to passengers.

In addition to the call buttons, elevators usually have floor indicators and direction lanterns. The former are almost universal in cab interiors with more than two stops and may be found outside the elevators as well on one or more of the floors. Up until the 1980s, floor indicators typically had an analog strip of numbers that would light up individually. Around that time, digital floor indicators began appearing, usually either segmented or dot-matrix displays. More detailed displays first began appearing in the early 1990s with Otis's electroluminescent display, and became more common as LCDs became more viable in the 21st century. Likewise, a change of floors or an arrival at a floor is indicated by a sound, depending on the elevator. Some buildings use proximity technology that recognizes residents and brings the elevator to ground level.

Direction lanterns are also found both inside and outside elevator cars, but they should always be visible from outside because their primary purpose is to help people decide whether or not to get on the elevator. If somebody waiting for the elevator wants to go up, but a car comes first that indicates that it is going down, then the person may decide not to get on the elevator. If the person waits, then one will still stop going up. Direction indicators are sometimes etched with arrows or shaped like arrows and/or use the convention that one that lights up red means "down" and green (or white) means "up". Since the color convention is often undermined or over-ridden by systems that do not invoke it, it is usually used only in conjunction with other differentiating factors. An example of a place whose elevators use only the color convention to differentiate between directions is the Museum of Contemporary Art in Chicago, where a single circle can be made to light up green for "up" and red for "down". Sometimes directions must be inferred by the position of the indicators relative to one another.

In addition to lanterns, most elevators have a chime to indicate if the elevator is going up or down either before or after the doors open, usually in conjunction with the lanterns lighting up. For example, one chime can indicate "up", two "down", and no chimes indicate an elevator that is 'free'.

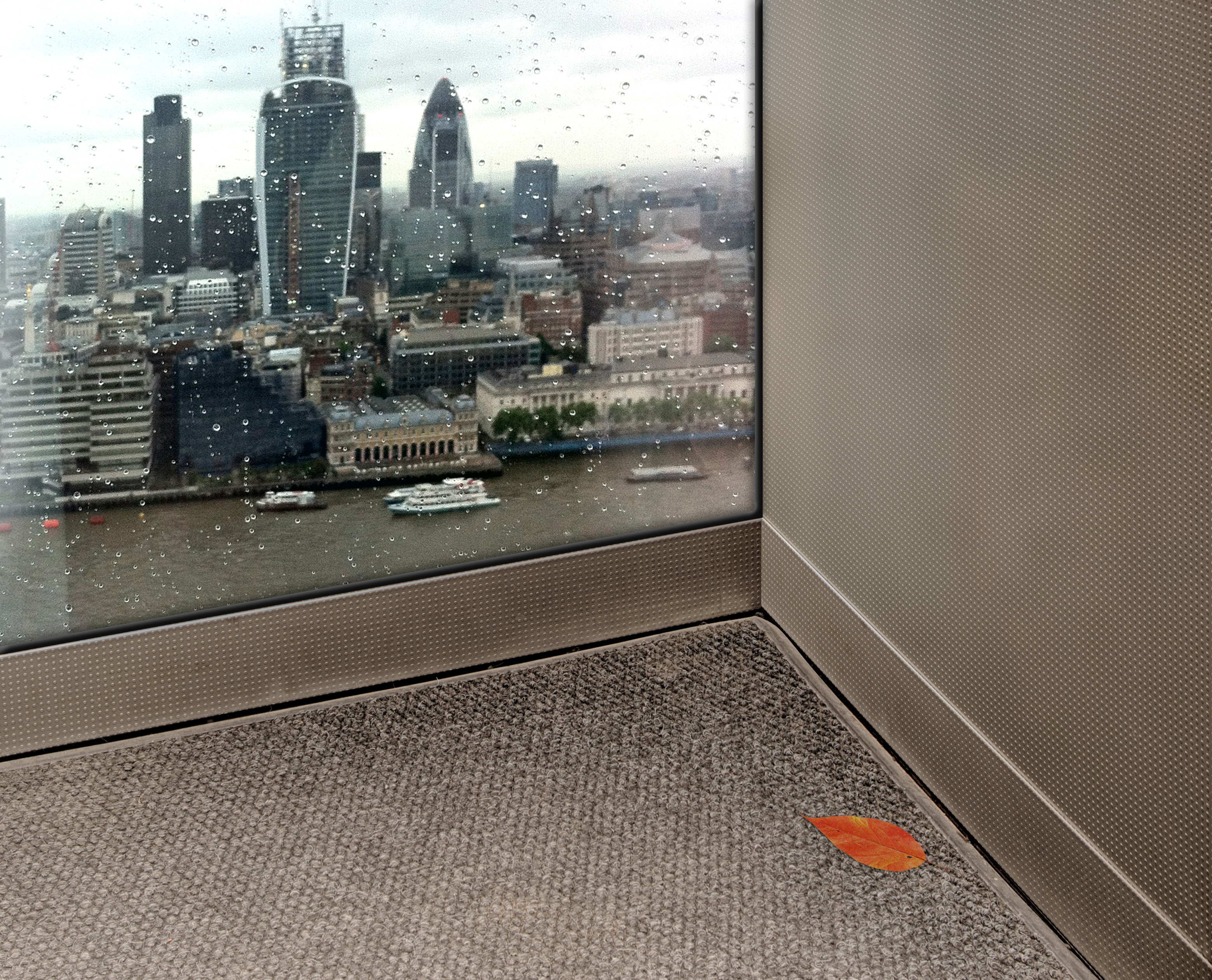
Elevator with a virtual window affording a view of the City of London

Observatory service elevators often convey other facts of interest, including elevator speed, stopwatch, and current position (altitude), as with the case for Taipei 101's service elevators.

There are several technologies aimed to provide better experience to passengers suffering from claustrophobia, anthropophobia or social anxiety. Israeli startup DigiGage uses motion sensors to scroll the pre-rendered images, building and floor-specific content on a screen embedded into the wall as the cab moves up and down. British company LiftEye provides a virtual window technology to turn common elevator into panoramic. It creates 3d video panorama using live feed from cameras placed vertically along the facade and synchronizes it with cab movement. The video is projected on a wall-sized screens making it look like the walls are made of glass.

== Air conditioning ==
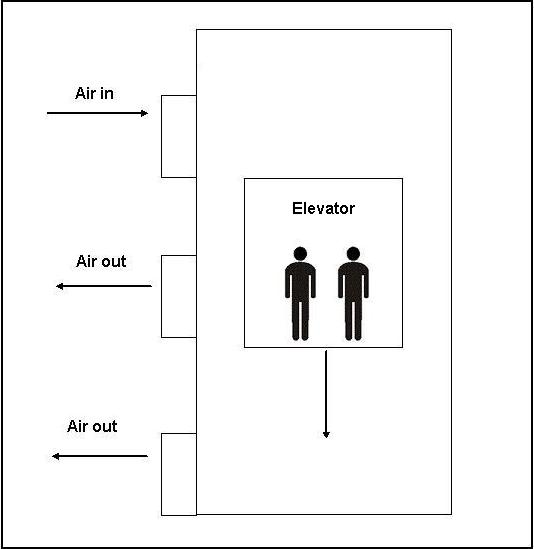
Elevator airflow diagram

The primary reason for installing an elevator air conditioner is the comfort that it provides while traveling in the elevator. It stabilizes the condition of the air inside the elevator car. Some elevator air conditioners can be used in countries with cold climates if a thermostat is used to reverse the refrigeration cycle to warm the elevator car.

Heat generated from the cooling process is dissipated into the hoistway. The elevator cab (or car) is ordinarily not air-tight, and some of this heat may reenter the car and reduce the overall cooling effect.

The air from the lobby constantly leaks into the elevator shaft due to elevator movements as well as elevator shaft ventilation requirements. Using this conditioned air in the elevator does not increase energy costs. However, by using an independent elevator air conditioner to achieve better temperature control inside the car, more energy will be used.

Air conditioning poses a problem to elevators because of the condensation that occurs. The condensed water produced has to be disposed of; otherwise, it would create flooding in the elevator car and hoistway.

=== Methods of removing condensed water ===
There are at least four ways to remove condensed water from the air conditioner. However, each solution has its pros and cons.

=== Atomizing ===
Atomizing, also known as misting the condensed water, is one way to dispose of the condensed water. Spraying ultra-fine water droplets onto the hot coils of the air conditioner ensures that the condensed water evaporates quickly.

Though this is one of the best methods to dispose of the condensed water, it is also one of the costliest because the nozzle that atomizes the water easily gets choked. The majority of the cost goes to maintaining the entire atomizing system.

=== Boiling ===
Disposing of condensed water works by firstly collecting the condensed water and then heating it to above boiling point. The condensed water is eventually evaporated, thereby disposing of it.

Consumers are reluctant to employ this system because of the high rate of energy used just to dispose of this water.

=== Cascading ===
The cascading method works by flowing the condensed water directly onto the hot coils of the air conditioner. This eventually evaporates the condensed water.

The downside of this technology is that the coils have to be at extremely high temperature for the condensed water to be evaporated. There is a chance that the water might not evaporate entirely and that would cause water to overflow onto the exterior of the car.

=== Drainage system ===
Drainage system works by creating a sump to collect the condensed water and using a pump to dispose of it through a drainage system.

It is an efficient method, but it comes at a heavy price because of the cost of building the sump. Moreover, maintaining the pump to make sure it operates is very expensive. Furthermore, the pipes used for drainage would look ugly on the exterior. This system also cannot be implemented on a built project.

== ISO 22559 ==
An international symbol for elevator

The mechanical and electrical design of elevators is dictated according to various standards (aka elevator codes), which may be international, national, state, regional or city based. Whereas once many standards were prescriptive, specifying exact criteria which must be complied with, there has recently been a shift towards more performance-based standards where the onus falls on the designer to ensure that the elevator meets or exceeds the standard.

National elevator standards:

- Australia – AS1735
- Canada – CAN/CSA B44
- Europe – EN 81 series (EN 81–20, EN 81–21, EN 81–28, EN 81–70, EN 12015, EN 12016, EN 13015, etc.)
- India – Indian Standard – Installation and Maintenance of home lifts (Code of practice 2002)
- US – ASME A17

converged in ISO 22559 series, "Safety requirements for lifts (elevators)":

- Part 1: Global essential safety requirements (GESRs).
- Part 2: Safety parameters meeting the global essential safety requirements (GESRs).
- Part 3: Global conformity assessment procedures (GCAP) – Prerequisites for certification of conformity of lift systems, lift components and lift functions
- Part 4: Global conformity assessment procedures (GCAP) – Certification and accreditation requirements

ISO/TC 178 is the Technical Committee on Lifts, escalators and moving walks.

Because an elevator is part of a building, it must also comply with building code standards relating to earthquake resilience, fire standards, electrical wiring rules and so forth.

The American National Elevator Standards Group (ANESG) sets an elevator weight standard to be 1,000 kg (2,200 lb).

Additional requirements relating to access by disabled persons, may be mandated by laws or regulations such as the Americans with Disabilities Act. Elevators marked with a Star of Life are big enough for a stretcher.

=== U.S. and Canadian standard specifics ===
In most US and Canadian jurisdictions, passenger elevators are required to conform to the American Society of Mechanical Engineers' Standard A17.1, Safety Code for Elevators and Escalators. As of 2006, all states except Kansas, Mississippi, North Dakota, and South Dakota have adopted some version of ASME codes, though not necessarily the most recent. In Canada the document is the CAN/CSA B44 Safety Standard, which was harmonized with the US version in the 2000 edition. In addition, passenger elevators may be required to conform to the requirements of A17.3 for existing elevators where referenced by the local jurisdiction. Passenger elevators are tested using the ASME A17.2 Standard. The frequency of these tests is mandated by the local jurisdiction, which may be a town, city, state or provincial standard.

Passenger elevators must also conform to many ancillary building codes including the local or state building code, National Fire Protection Association standards for electrical, fire sprinklers and fire alarms, plumbing codes, and HVAC codes. Also, passenger elevators are required to conform to the Americans with Disabilities Act and other state and federal civil rights legislation regarding accessibility.

Residential elevators are required to conform to ASME A17.1. platform and wheelchair elevators are required to comply with ASME A18.1 in most US jurisdictions.

Most elevators have a location in which the permit for the building owner to operate the elevator is displayed. While some jurisdictions require the permit to be displayed in the elevator cab, other jurisdictions allow for the operating permit to be kept on file elsewhere – such as the maintenance office – and to be made available for inspection on demand. In such cases instead of the permit being displayed in the elevator cab, often a notice is posted in its place informing riders of where the actual permits are kept.

== Unique installations ==
=== World statistics ===
Country	Number of elevators installed
Italy	900,000
United States	900,000
China	4,000,000
South Korea	530,000 700,000 (as of June 2019)
Russia	520,000
Spain	950,000

As of January 2008, Spain is the nation with the most elevators installed per capita in the world, with 950,000 elevators installed that run more than one hundred million lifts every day, followed by United States with 700,000 elevators installed and China with 610,000 elevators installed since 1949. In Brazil, it is estimated that there are approximately 300,000 elevators currently in operation. The world's largest market for elevators is Italy, with more than 1,629 million euros of sales and 1,224 million euros of internal market.

In Spain, the elevators in maintenance invoice €4 million a year, and €250 million in repairs. In 2012, Spain exported €300 million in elevators.

In South Korea there are 530,000 elevators in operation, with 36,000 added in 2015. Hyundai elevators has 48% market share ThyssenKrupp Elevator Korea (formerly the Dongyang Elevator Co.) 17%, Otis Elevator Korea (formerly the elevator division of LG Industrial Systems) 16%, as of 2015. South Korea record 50,000 elevators sales in 2018 with 700,000 accumulated operation as of June,2019. Korean annual elevator maintenance market is around US$1 billion.

=== Eiffel Tower ===
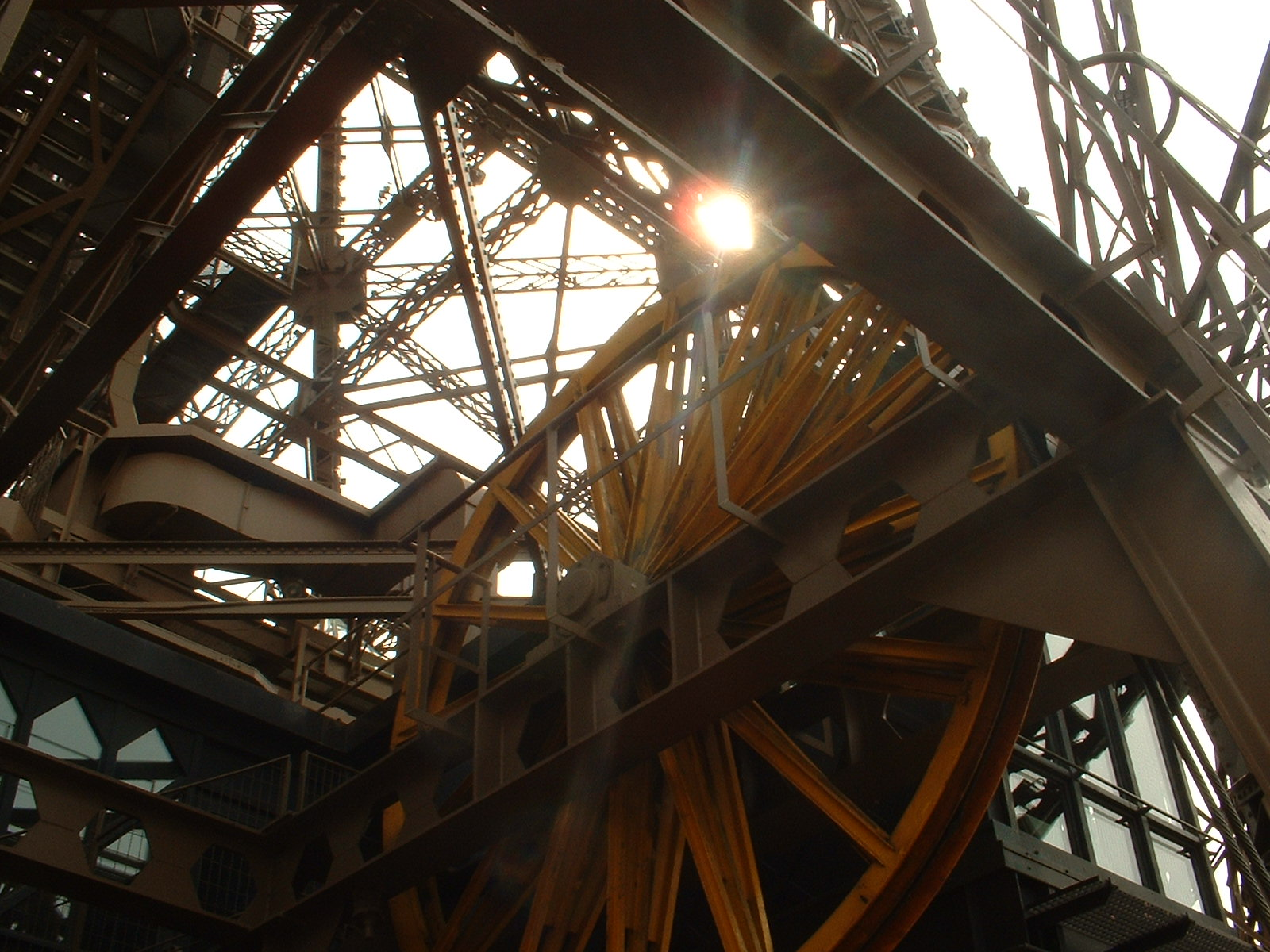
An elevator pulley in the Eiffel Tower

The Eiffel Tower has Otis double-deck elevators built into the legs of the tower, serving the ground level to the first and second levels. Even though the shaft runs diagonally upwards with the contour of the tower, both the upper and lower cars remain horizontally level. The offset distance of the two cars changes throughout the journey.

There are four elevator cars of the traditional design that run from the second level to the third level. The cars are connected to their opposite pairs (opposite in the elevator landing/hall) and use each other as the counterweight. As one car ascends from level 2, the other descends from level 3. The operations of these elevators are synchronized by a light signal in the car.

=== Taipei 101 ===
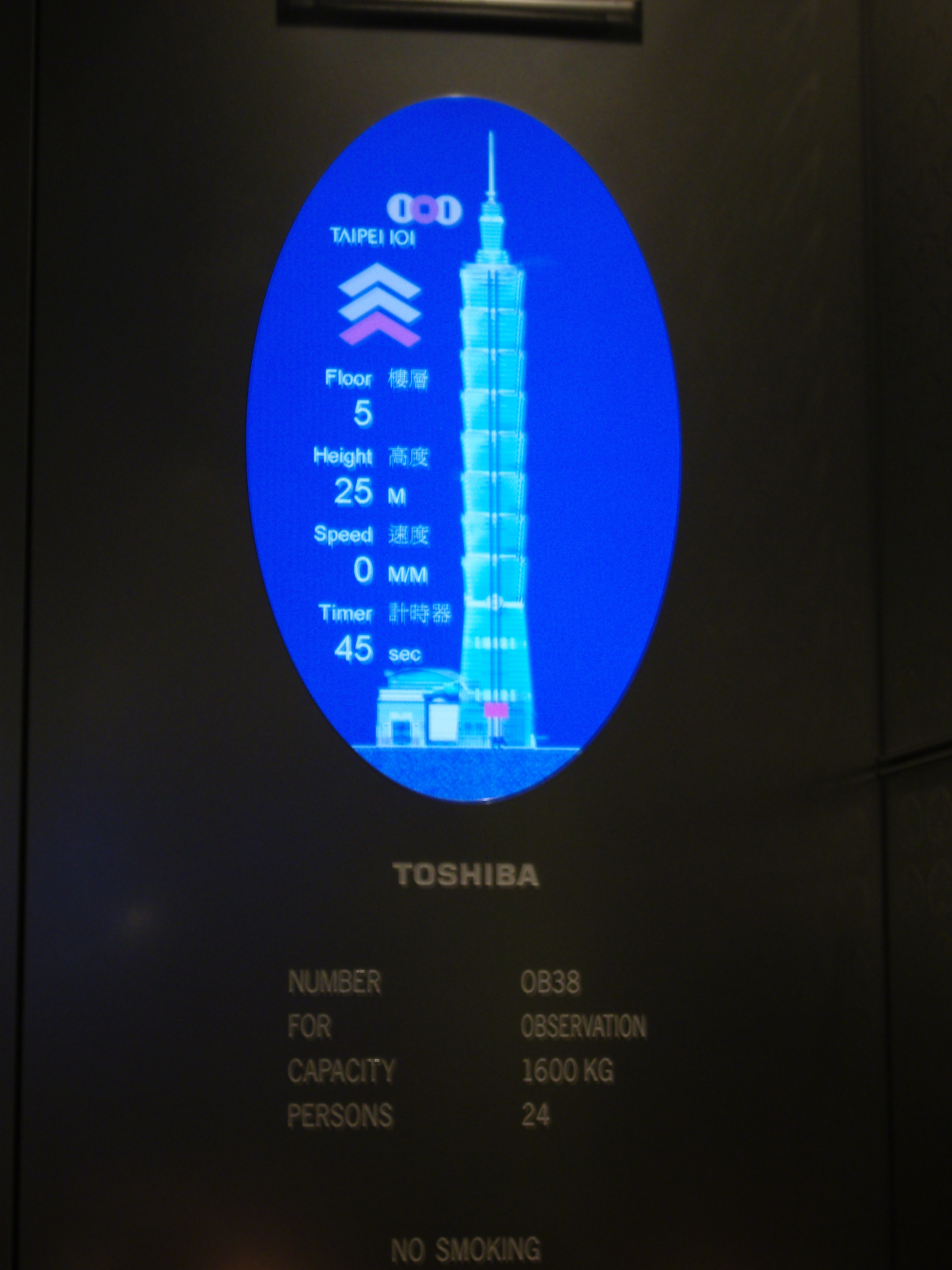
The observation deck elevator floor indicator in the Taipei 101

Double deck elevators, installed by Toshiba using Kone EcoDisc machinery, are used in the Taipei 101 office tower. Tenants of even-numbered floors first take an escalator (or an elevator from the parking garage) to the 2nd level, where they will enter the upper deck and arrive at their floors. The lower deck is turned off during low-volume hours, and the upper deck can act as a single-level elevator stopping at all adjacent floors. For example, the 85th floor restaurants can be accessed from the 60th floor sky-lobby. Restaurant customers must clear their reservations at the reception counter on the 2nd floor. A bank of express elevators stop only on the sky lobby levels (36 and 60, upper-deck car), where tenants can transfer to "local" elevators.

The high-speed observation deck elevators accelerate to a former world-record certified speed of 1,010 metres per minute (61 km/h) in 16 seconds, and then it slows down for arrival with subtle air pressure sensations. The door opens after 37 seconds from the 5th floor. Special features include aerodynamic car and counterweights, and cabin pressure control to help passengers adapt smoothly to pressure changes. The downwards journey is completed at a reduced speed of 600 meters per minute, with the doors opening at the 52nd second. Many high speed elevators also have aerodynamic cab exteriors.

=== Gateway Arch ===
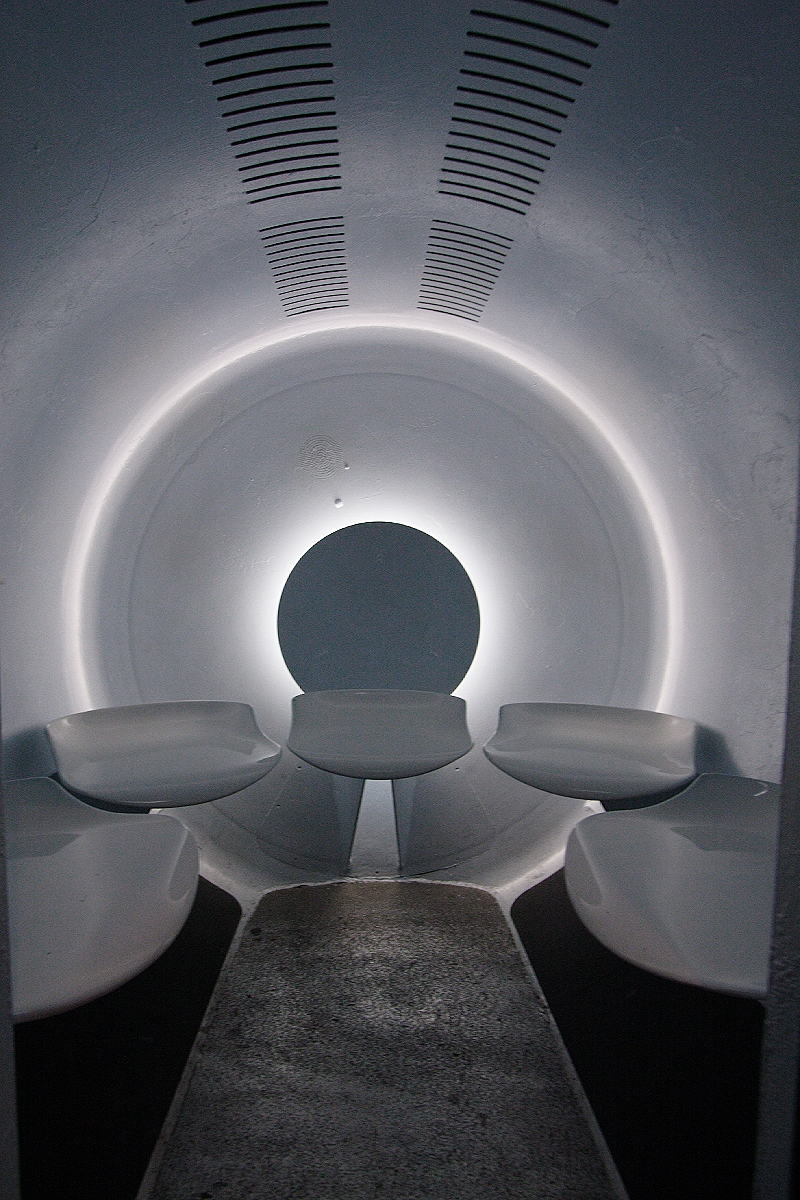
The interior of one of the Gateway Arch tramway cars

The Gateway Arch in St. Louis uses a unique tram system to transport visitors to the observation deck. Passengers enter horizontal compartments that form a train, tilting to maintain level orientation as they ascend the curved tracks within the Arch. Two tramways operate at each end, offering views of the Arch's interior structure through windowed doors. The cars transition from hanging below the cables to resting atop them during the journey.

=== New City Hall, Hanover, Germany ===
The elevator at the New City Hall, Hanover, Germany

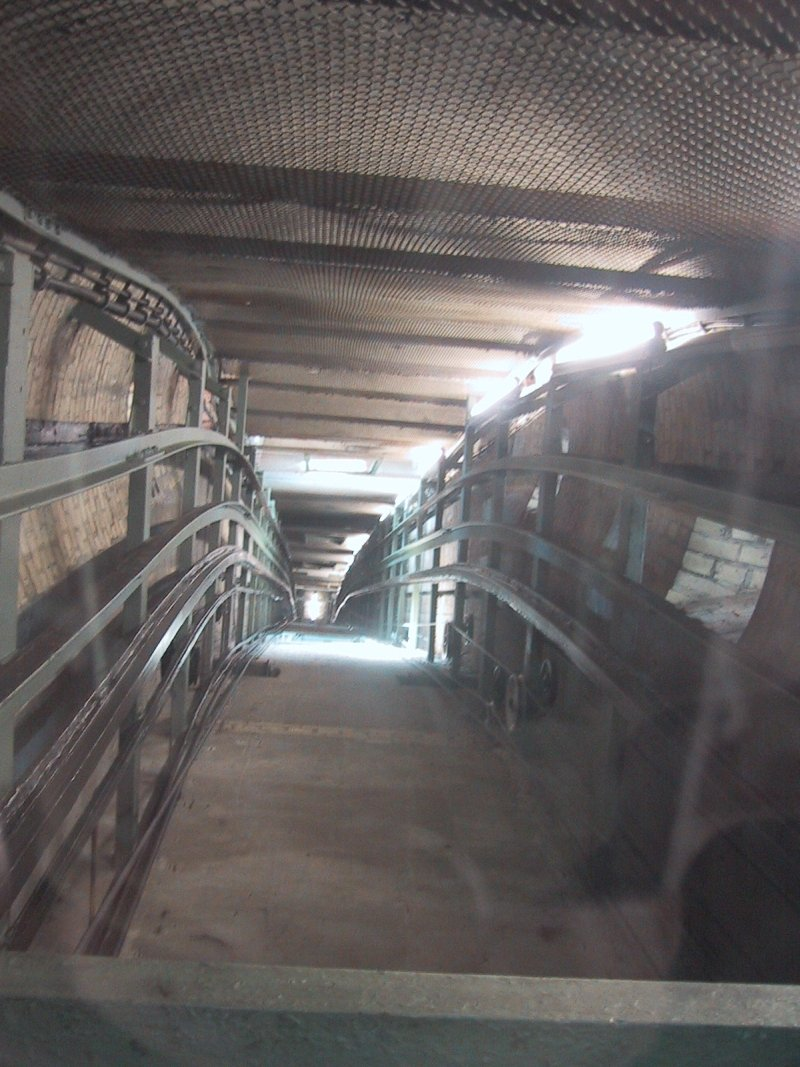
View up the shaft

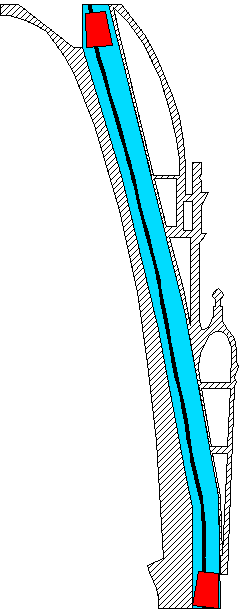
The cabin at the bottom and the top

The elevator in the New City Hall in Hanover, Germany is a technical rarity, and unique in Europe, as the elevator starts straight up but then changes its angle by 15 degrees to follow the contour of the dome of the hall. The cabin therefore tilts 15 degrees during the ride. The elevator travels a height of 43 meters. The new city hall was built in 1913. The elevator was destroyed in 1943 and rebuilt in 1954.

=== Luxor incline elevator ===
The Luxor Hotel in Las Vegas, Nevada, United States has inclined elevators. The shape of this casino is a pyramid, and the elevator travels up the side of the pyramid at a 39-degree angle. Other locations with inclined elevators include the Cityplace Station in Dallas, Texas, the Huntington Metro Station in Huntington, Virginia, 34th Street–Hudson Yards station in New York City and the San Diego Convention Center in San Diego, California

=== Radisson Blu, Berlin, Germany ===
At the Radisson Blu hotel in Berlin, Germany, the main elevator was surrounded by the AquaDom aquarium; 82 feet tall, the aquarium contained more than a thousand different fish until it shattered in December 2022. The design offered views of the fish to people using the elevator. The special elevator was built by the German company GBH-Design GmbH

=== For urban transport ===
In some towns where terrain is difficult to navigate, elevators are used as part of urban transport systems.

Examples:

- Almada, Portugal – Boca do Vento Elevator
- Bad Schandau, Germany – Bad Schandau Elevator
- Brussels, Belgium – Poelaert Elevators
- Bürgenstock, Switzerland – Hammetschwand Elevator
- Coimbra, Portugal – Elevador do Mercado
- İzmir, Turkey – Asansör
- Lisbon, Portugal – Elevador de Santa Justa, Castelo (planned), Chiado (closed), Município/Biblioteca (demolished)
- Luxembourg City, Luxembourg – Pfaffenthal Panoramic Elevator
- Lynchburg, Virginia, US – Lynchburg Public Elevator Connects pedestrians from Church street on the lower level to Court Street on the upper level.
- Nagasaki, Japan – Skyway
- Oregon City, Oregon, US – Oregon City Municipal Elevator
- Porto, Portugal – Elevador da Ribeira
- Salvador, Bahia, Brazil – Elevador Lacerda
- Salzburg, Austria - Mönchsbergaufzug
- Stockholm, Sweden – Katarina Elevator
- Valletta, Malta – Barrakka Lift, which connects the Upper Barrakka Gardens (on the top of the fortifications) to the harbor
- Whanganui, New Zealand – Durie Hill Elevator; originally built by subdividers of suburb

== IOT elevators ==
Internet of things (IOT) technology application is being used in elevators to improve performance, operations, monitoring, maintenance with help of remote diagnostics, real time notifications and predictive behavioral insights.

== World's fastest elevators ==
The Guangzhou CTF Finance Centre holds the current record of world's fastest elevators with their cars traveling at 75.6 km/h (47.0 mph). The elevator, which was tested out the speed in June 2017, was manufactured by Hitachi, and was confirmed a Guinness World Record Sept. 2019.

However, on the way down, the elevators at Yokohama Landmark Tower, manufactured by Mitsubishi Electric, descend at 45 km/h (28 mph), and still hold the record for the fastest descending elevator in the world.

== See also ==
- Building transportation systems
- Double-deck elevator
- Elevator consultant
- Elevator mechanic
- Elevator paradox
- Elevator surfing
- Incline elevator
- Paternoster lift
- Schmid peoplemover
- Shopping cart conveyor
- Space elevator
- Stairlift
- Wheelchair lift
- List of elevator accidents
- List of elevator manufacturers
