= Accessible vehicle =

Accessible vehicle may refer to:

- Adapted automobile, an automobile adapted for ease of use by people with disabilities
- Accessible transport
- Cars for wheelchair users, small vehicles designed to be driven by a wheelchair user
- Low-floor bus, a bus or trolleybus with no stairs between the ground and its floor
- Low-floor tram, a tram with no stairs between its entrance and passenger cabin
  - Ultra Low Floor tram.
- Low-floor train
- Recumbent bicycle, a bicycle ridden in a laid-back reclining position
- Wheelchair accessible van, a vehicle modified for wheelchair entry
