= Driver rehabilitation =

Type of rehabilitation

Driver rehabilitation is a type of rehabilitation that helps individuals facing challenges caused by a physical or cognitive impairment or age to achieve safe, independent driving or transportation options through education or information dissemination. Professionals who work in the field use adaptive equipment and modified vehicles to help people attain independent community mobility.

== History ==
Many driver rehabilitation programs began in the early 1970s through the Department of Veterans Affairs (VA). The VA only offers driver rehabilitation services and funding to its veterans who seek transportation options. As of 2009, the VA offers driver rehabilitation services in 43 cities.

The field has since expanded beyond the VA to serve clients of all legal driving ages. The Association for Driver Rehabilitation Specialists (ADED) was founded in 1977 to support and advance the driver rehabilitation professionals working in the field of driver education, driver training and transportation equipment modifications for persons with disabilities and persons experiencing the aging process. Thirty people, from ten states, attended ADED's first official meeting. The initial meeting determined the type of organizational structure, the official name, initial officers, standing committees, and membership fees. Today, ADED is the primary professional organization in the specialized area of driver rehabilitation. ADED has continued to expand. Emphasis is placed on the yearly conference with its pre-conference workshops, conference training programs and one of the largest exhibits of products for both the driver with a disability as well as for the professional working in this field. Membership also continues to increase with representation from nearly every state as well as internationally

The National Mobility Equipment Dealers Association was founded in 1989 to broaden the opportunities for people with disabilities to drive or be transported in vehicles modified with adaptive equipment.

In 2003, the American Occupational Therapy Association developed the Older Driver Initiative to develop services for older drivers.

== Practice ==
The goal of driver rehabilitation is to aid individuals with disabilities or age-related impairments maintain independent driving and transportation. This may be done through the use of specialized mobility equipment and training. The process begins with a clinical assessment of an individual's visual, visual-perceptual, cognitive, and physical skills that are necessary for driving. If the individual meets the criteria, an on-road assessment is conducted, in which the evaluator uses a vehicle equipped with adaptive driving equipment, as well as auxiliary brake and mirror on the passenger's side of the vehicle. Accommodations can be made via the use of mechanical or electronic steering, and acceleration and braking equipment, which are based on the results of the clinical assessment. If it is determined that the person has the potential to drive, training is offered to develop proficiency in using the mobility equipment. For novice drivers, driver's education is included in the services. Following training, a vehicle equipment prescription is provided, with a referral to a mobility equipment dealer for equipment installation. When the installation is completed, the vehicle is checked for proper fit, with additional training provided as needed.

In other instances, such as after an illness or injury, an assessment of the person's capacity for driving is required. No adaptive driving equipment may be needed; the focus is on identifying any changes in the person's sensory, motor, visual, perceptual, or cognitive ability. The clinical assessment is conducted first, followed by the on-road assessment, using a vehicle equipped with the passenger brake, mirror, and in some instances, an auxiliary steering wheel.

If an individual does not possess the ability to drive, they are often referred to other therapy programs, such as wheelchair seating programs, occupational therapy, vision therapy, physical therapy, or cognitive therapy.

For individuals who plan to be passengers only, driver rehabilitation evaluations are recommended to determine the person's ability to get in and out of the vehicle, the vehicle's appropriateness for safe transportation, and the safe transportation of mobility aids, e.g. scooters, manual or power wheelchairs, including proper securement of the mobility device. Recommendations for vehicle modifications may include the use of a wheelchair accessible van, wheelchair lift, or wheelchair ramp.

== Personnel ==
A driver rehabilitation specialist is a specialist who "plans, develops, coordinates and implements driving services for individuals with disabilities". Driver rehabilitation specialists work with physicians, allied health personnel, Department of Motor Vehicles personnel, and mobility equipment dealers.

Driver rehabilitation programs are offered in a variety of settings, such as rehabilitation hospitals, hospital outpatient therapy departments, veteran's hospitals, or as private driving schools. Professionals who work in this field are often members of ADED; where professional fields consist of:

- Drivers education/training
- Equipment manufacturers
- Equipment dealers
- Physiotherapy/Physical therapy
- Kinesiotherapist
- Occupational therapy
- Speech-language pathology
- Rehabilitation engineering
- Rehabilitation specialists
- Rehabilitation technology
- Vocational rehabilitation

== Education and training ==
Occupational therapists and driver educators comprise the two largest groups of professionals, with other professionals from the fields of rehabilitation counseling, physical therapy, rehabilitation engineering, and psychology. Occupational therapists may utilize the term "driving rehabilitation" to reflect the profession's focus on the "occupation" of driving.

Many driver rehabilitation specialists obtain specialty certification from ADED. CDRS® Certified Driver Rehabilitation Specialist) is a credential offered by ADED: Representing advanced experience and expertise in diverse areas within the field. A CDRS® is an experienced practitioner in the field of driver rehabilitation who, through successful completion of a formal certification examination, has proven their capacity to provide services within the full spectrum of driver rehabilitation services. The CDRS® is considered by ADED to be the gold-standard in terms of driver rehabilitation service provision. A CDRS® is obligated to follow ADED's Best Practice Guidelines to keep driver evaluations standardized, formalized and objective, and attests they will adhere to the ADED's Code of Ethics. The CDRS® credential requires 30-hours of continuing education per 3-year cycle and is renewed via application and subject to audit.
