= Chairiot solo =

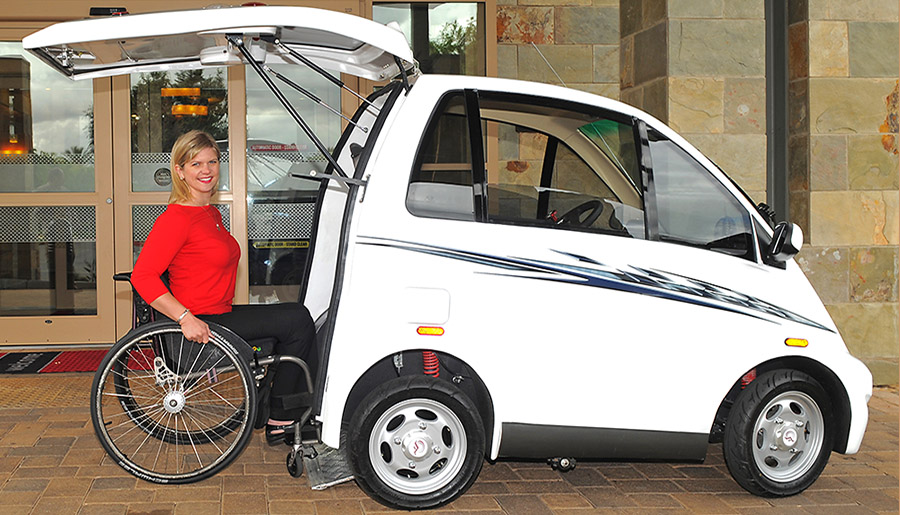
- 2014 Chairiot solo

Overview
- Manufacturer: Chairiot Mobility Inc.
- Production: July 2014–2019
- Model years: 2014–2019

Body and chassis
- Class: Wheelchair accessible
- Layout: Rear wheel drive - wheel hub motor

The Chairiot solo is a wheelchair accessible microcar manufactured by Chairiot Mobility Inc. It is one of the few cars for wheelchair users designed specifically for that purpose, and not a conversion.

== Description ==
Introduced in 2014, it is a single-occupant, electric car that allows a disabled person in a wheelchair to roll into the vehicle using a rear hatch and ramp, and secure their wheelchair at the driving position. The Chairiot solo is intended for urban driving, not freeway use, and meets the US DOT's Federal Motor Vehicle Safety Standards as a low-speed or neighborhood electric vehicle (NEV) under FMVSS 571.500. It allows drivers in wheelchairs to operate the vehicle without leaving their wheelchairs, and is believed to be the first vehicle of its kind to go on-sale in the US market.

== Features ==
The driver of a Chairiot solo can roll directly into the vehicle and operate it from the wheelchair.

The Chairiot solo is not a conversion; it was designed from inception to be driven by a disabled person using a wheelchair. The vehicle is entered through a large rear door and integrated ramp; a floor dock secures the wheelchair to the car. It is controlled by a steering wheel with a spinner knob, along with a combination twist grip throttle and lever for braking. All controls are operable with modest upper body strength. There are no foot pedals in the vehicle.

The Chairiot solo features a unitized composite body on a steel chassis; the rear door is also composite, with an integral steel frame. The front suspension is double wishbone with rack-and-pinion steering. The rear suspension is a trailing arm design with a torsion tube independently controlling the rear wheels. It is equipped with four-wheel disc brakes.

The Chairiot solo is powered twin hub motors rated at 3 kW each built into the rear wheels. A 48 volt AGM battery pack with a nominal capacity of 7.5 kW provides propulsive power; a 12 volt auxiliary battery is kept charged by the main pack and supplies power for the vehicle's electrical accessories. In the event of a motor failure, the Chairiot can continue to be driven on just one motor. The energy-efficient design provides a range of 40 to 50 miles on a full charge. During EPA urban cycle testing, the Chairiot solo achieved a fuel efficiency of 157 MPGe.

== Certifications ==
The Chairiot solo has been certified by the California Air Resources Board (CARB) as a zero emission vehicle. The National Mobility Equipment Dealers Association (NMEDA) announced in March 2015 that the Chairiot solo had passed its Conformance Review Program (CRP); it was the first low-speed, wheelchair accessible vehicle in the world to be certified by an independent authority to be in conformance with the U.S. Federal Motor Vehicle Safety Standards (FMVSS) 571.500.
