= Luxgen M7 =

Minivan

Luxgen M7 / V7 / M7 EV+
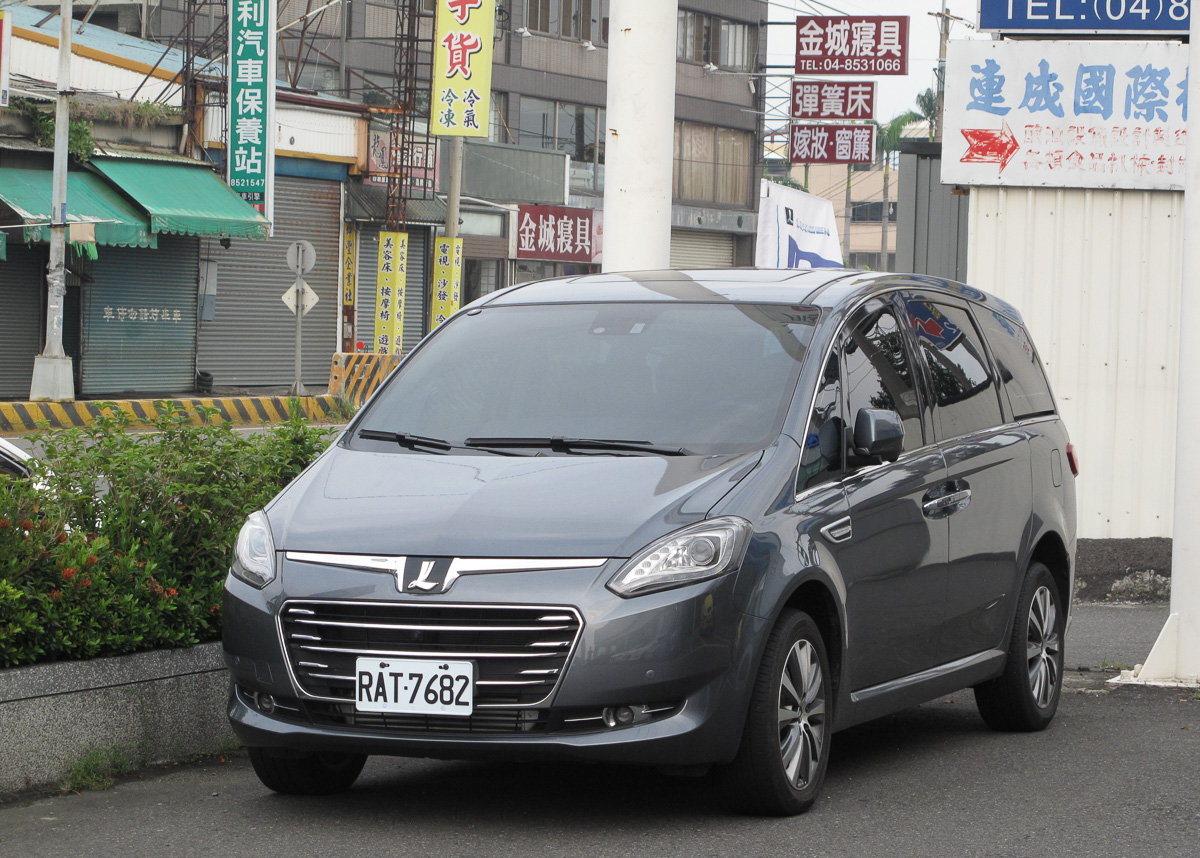

Overview
- Manufacturer: Luxgen
- Also called: Luxgen7 MPV (2009–2014)
- Production: 2009–September 2021 (M7); 2016–2021 (V7); 2010 (7 MPV EV+)
- Assembly: Miaoli, Taiwan; Hangzhou, China (Dongfeng Yulon)

Body and chassis
- Body style: Minivan
- Layout: Front Engine, Front Wheel Drive
- Platform: L7 platform
- Related: Luxgen7 SUV

Powertrain
- Engine: 2.2 L Turbocharged I-4
- Electric motor: AC induction electric motor (7 MPV EV+)
- Power output: 131 kW (178.1 PS; 175.7 hp) (2.2L); 148 kW (201.2 PS; 198.5 hp) (ECO HYPER); 120 kW (163.2 PS; 160.9 hp) (EV+)
- Transmission: 5-speed Manumatic transmission (2009–2014); 6-speed Aisin Manumatic transmission (2014–present)
- Battery: High performance lithium-ion battery pack

Dimensions
- Wheelbase: 2,910 mm (114.6 in)
- Length: 4,845 mm (190.7 in)
- Width: 1,876 mm (73.9 in)
- Height: 1,768 mm (69.6 in)
- Curb weight: 1,830–1,875 kg (4,034–4,134 lb)

The Luxgen M7, previously the Luxgen7 MPV is a 7-passenger Taiwanese automobile produced by Luxgen beginning from 2009.

== Overview ==
The vehicle was developed under Yulon's R&D center, HAITEC. It was officially shown to the public on 19 August 2009, and hit showrooms on 9/19/2009. The car is powered by a 2.2 L I-4 MEFI turbocharged engine developed by tuned by Delphi. The platform is derived from the Renault Espace. The turbocharger is supplied by Garrett and powers the engine up to 175 PS (129 kW; 173 hp) at 5,200 rpm and 28 kg⋅m (270 N⋅m; 200 lb⋅ft) of torque from 2,500 to 4,000 rpm. The 5-speed Manumatic transmission is supplied by Aisin. Pricing starts at NT$798,000 up to NT$1,068,000. ABS, EBD, BAS, and the Think+ Multi-purpose system(slightly different by trim level) are all standard equipment. The targeted competitor is the BYD Song Max. In 2014, the Luxgen7 MPV received a facelift and name change to Luxgen M7 to fit the new Luxgen naming theme.

The voice controlled Luxgen Think+ system (co-developed with HTC) combines the on-board Windows CE computer with the Electronic Stability Control system and it provides 3.5G mobile internet connection, GPS navigation, along with travel, shop, and traffic information.

A facelift was done in 2014 with a redesigned front bumper, dark head lamps with DRL, and a new set of LED tail lamps. The name was changed from Luxgen7 MPV to Luxgen M7 turbo Eco hyper, and the engine was also updated with a retuned 2.2-liter I4 turbo one with improved horsepower of 202PS and 30 kg⋅m (290 N⋅m; 220 lb⋅ft) of torque from 2,400 to 4,000 rpm. The fuel efficiency was also improved to 13.57 km/L(EPA) and 11.8 km/L(EU).

In September 2021, Luxgen confirmed that the ICE-only powered M7 minivan will be discontinued from late this year due to poor sales and implementation of the Environmental Protection Administration's Phase 6 automotive emissions standards, as its engine is unable to be modified further to remain in compliance with the new automotive emission standards.

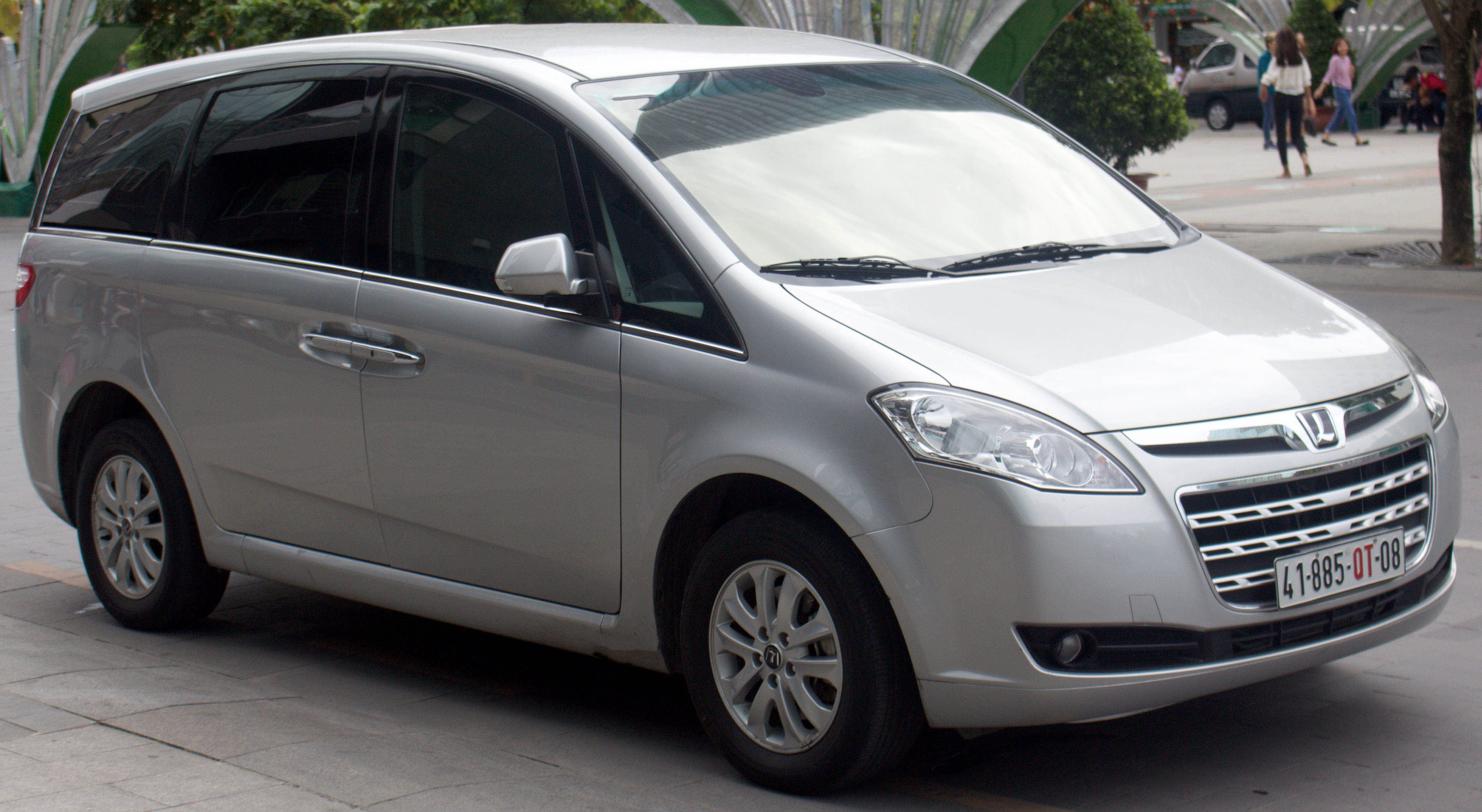
Pre-facelift Luxgen7 2.2 MPV front view (Vietnam)

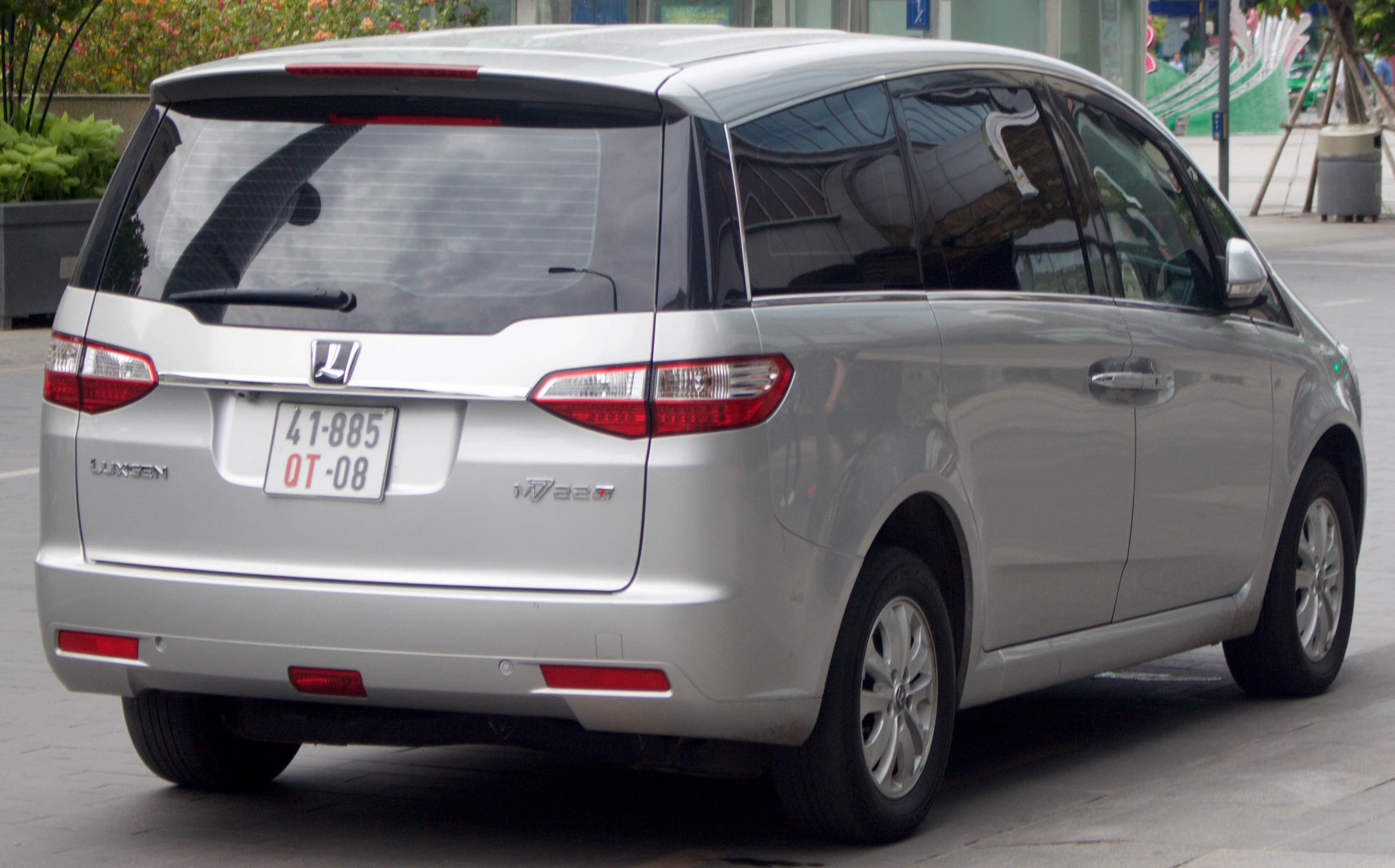
Pre-facelift Luxgen7 2.2 MPV rear view (Vietnam)

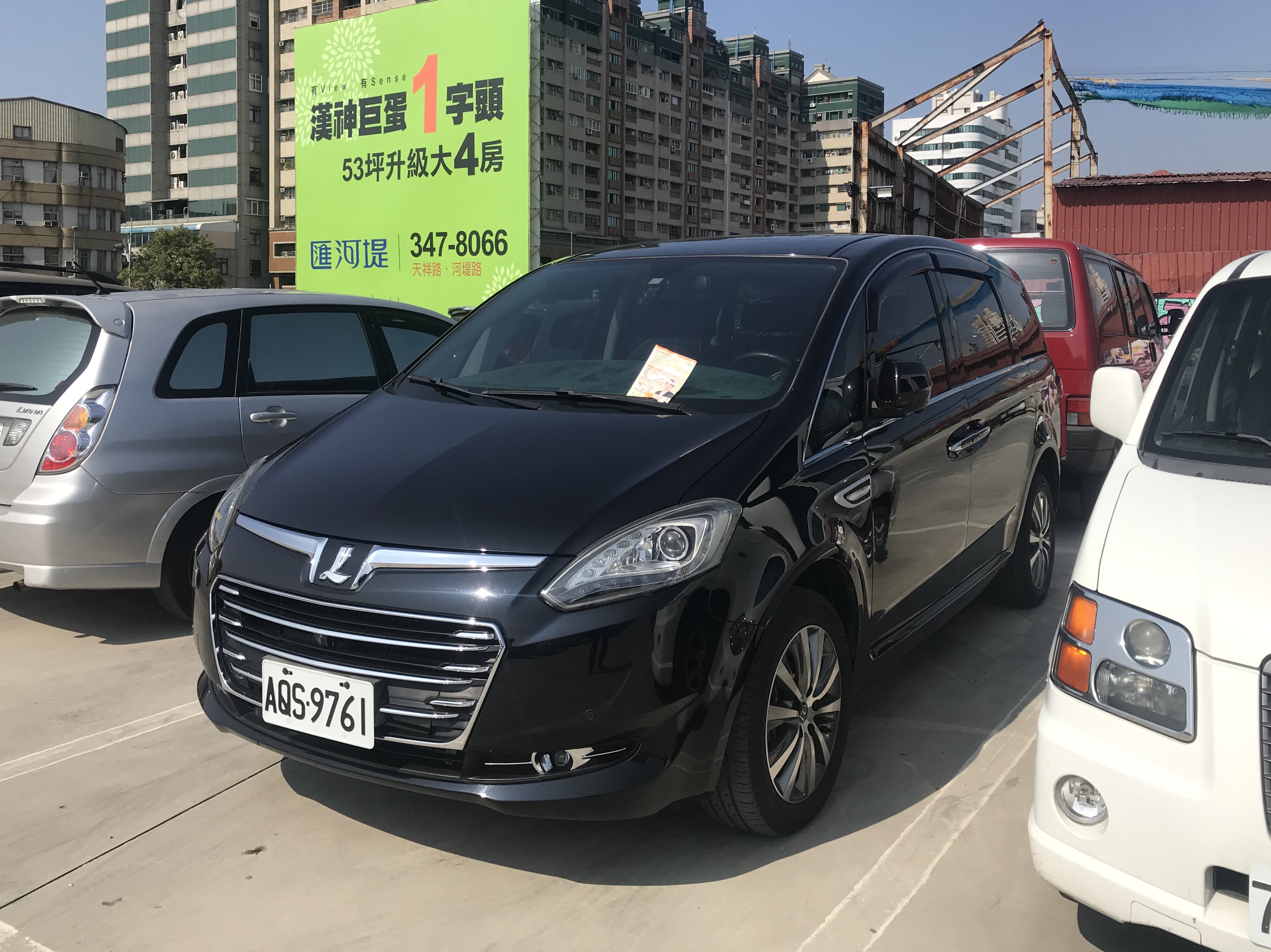
Post-facelift Luxgen M7 front view (Taiwan)

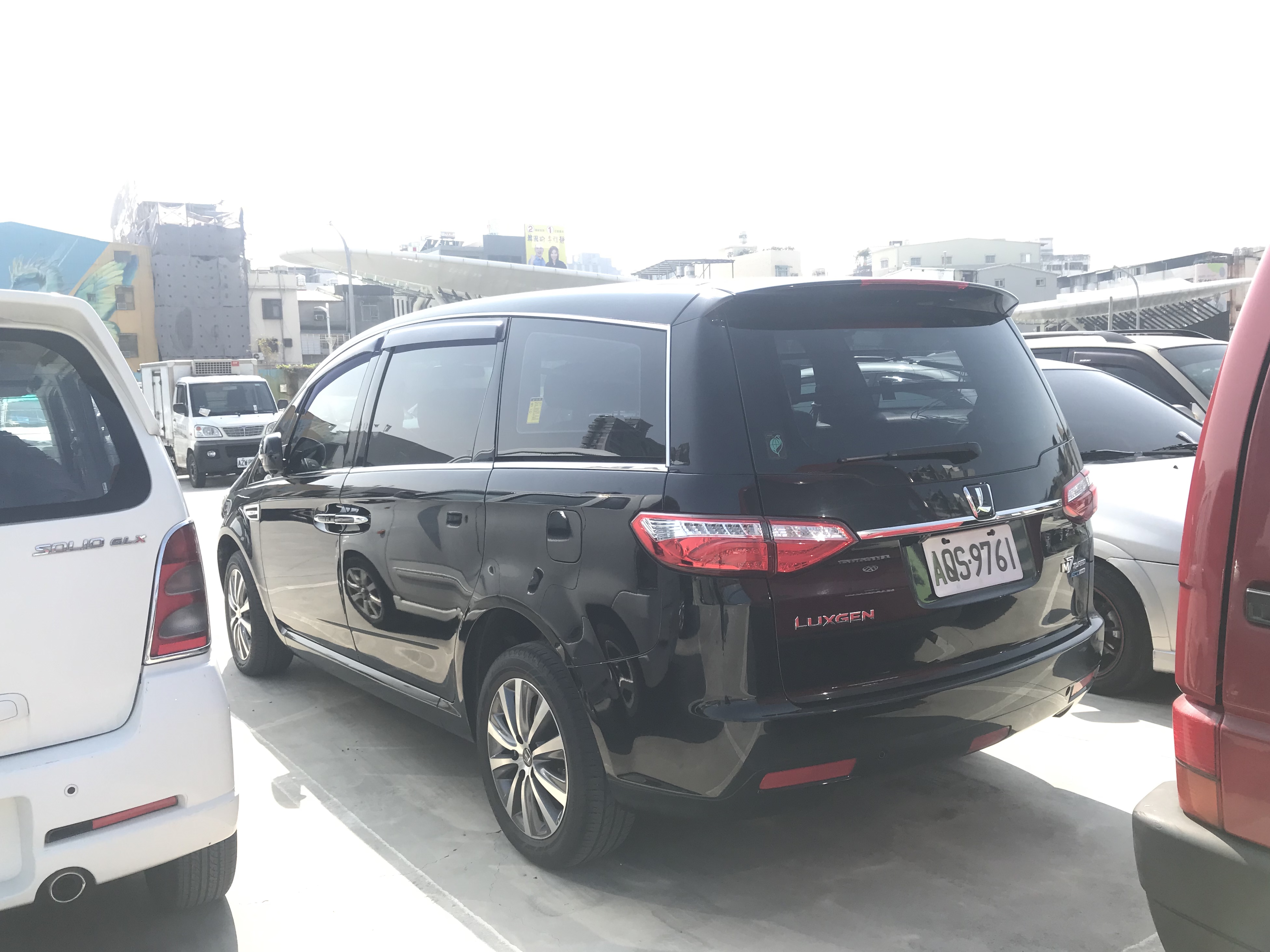
Post-facelift Luxgen M7 rear view (Taiwan)

== EV+ ==
Luxgen also introduced the world's first electric MPV, Luxgen7 MPV electric vehicle co-developed by AC Propulsion. The top speed is 145 km/h (90 mph) and the electric range is 350 kilometres (217 mi) at 40 km/h (25 mph). While most of the exterior was based on the regular Luxgen7 MPV, the EV+ receives a different front bumper and grille compartment design and clear tail lamp clusters in a lightly tinted blue color.

Years	Model	Power	Torque	Image
2009	Luxgen7 MPV	175 PS (129 kW; 173 hp)	274 N⋅m (202 lb⋅ft)	
2010	Luxgen7 MPV EV^{+}	240 PS (177 kW; 237 hp)	265 N⋅m (195 lb⋅ft)	

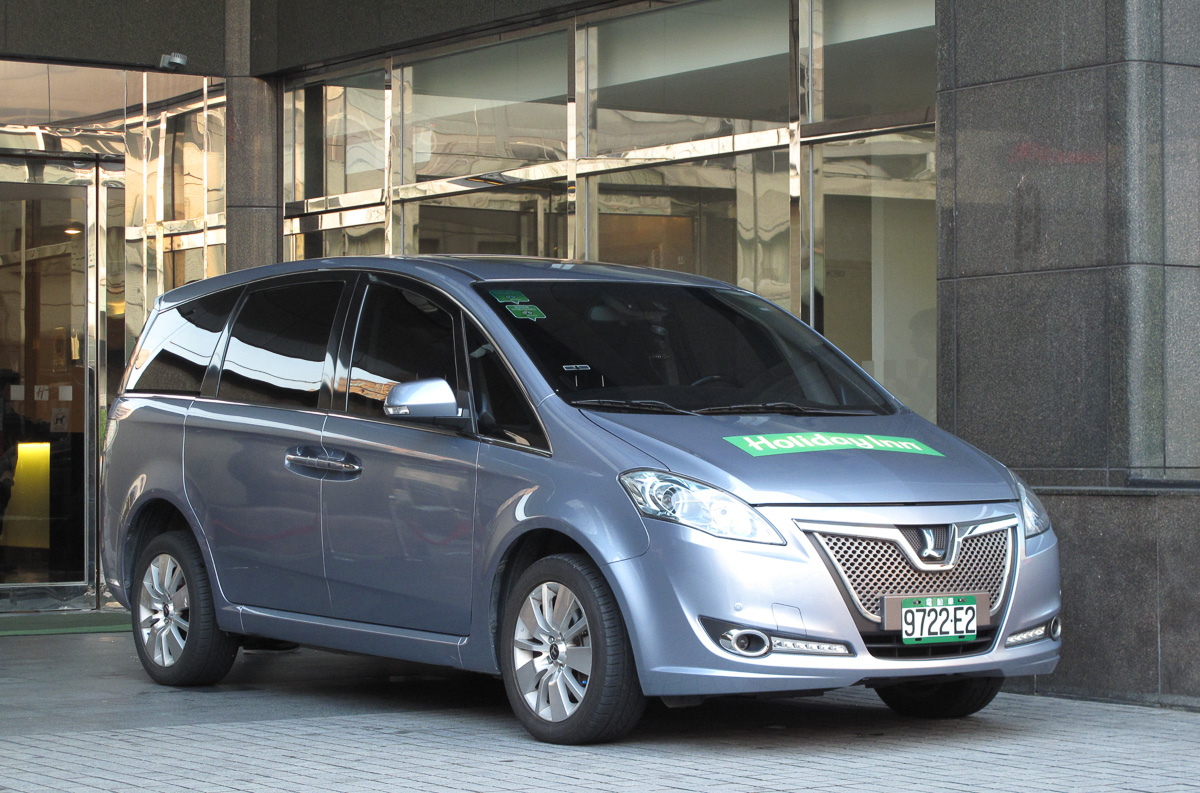
Luxgen7 MPV EV+

== CEO ==
The Luxgen 7 CEO is an executive limousine built on the MPV platform. Most parts of the vehicle body remains the same while on the exterior, the CEO receives a different grille design. It has two "first-class" rear seats with massage, recline and leg rest. A divider with motorized panels separates the passenger and driver compartments. The glass window can be frosted with the flick of a switch, along with an opaque panel that enhances privacy.

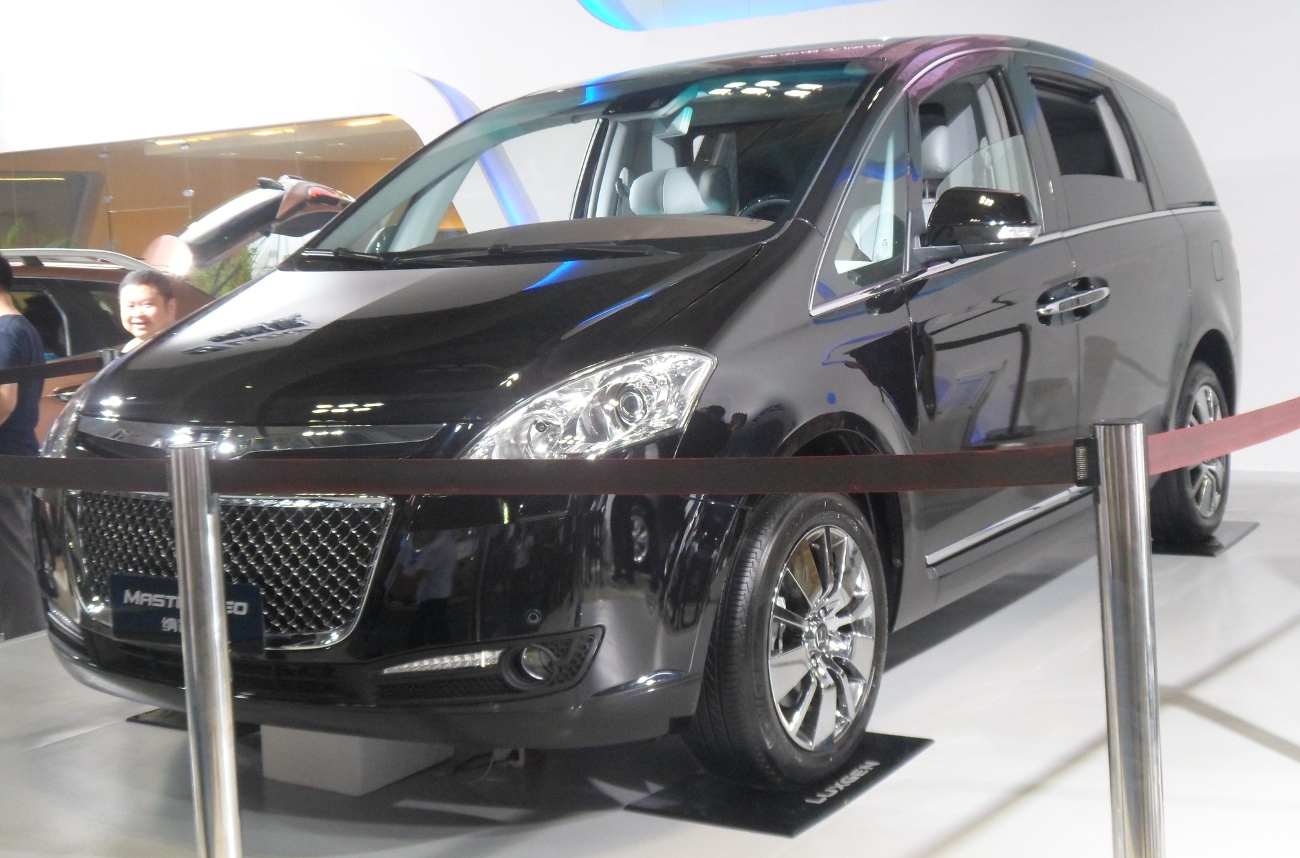
Luxgen7 CEO

== V7 ==
The Luxgen V7 is Luxgen's wheelchair accessible van based on the M7. It is launched in 2016 and is equipped with an extended and lower tailgate and a raised roof.

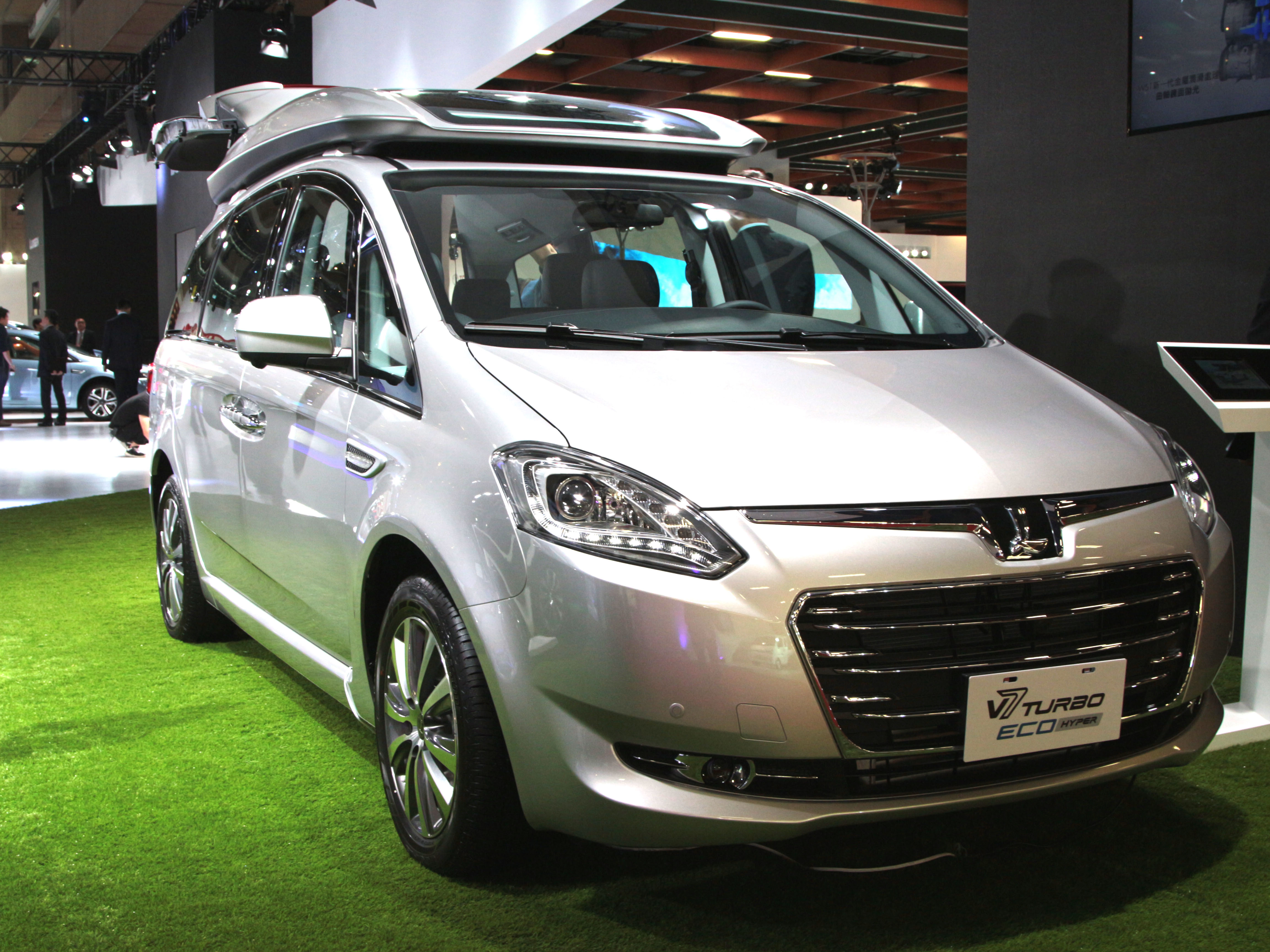
Luxgen V7 front view

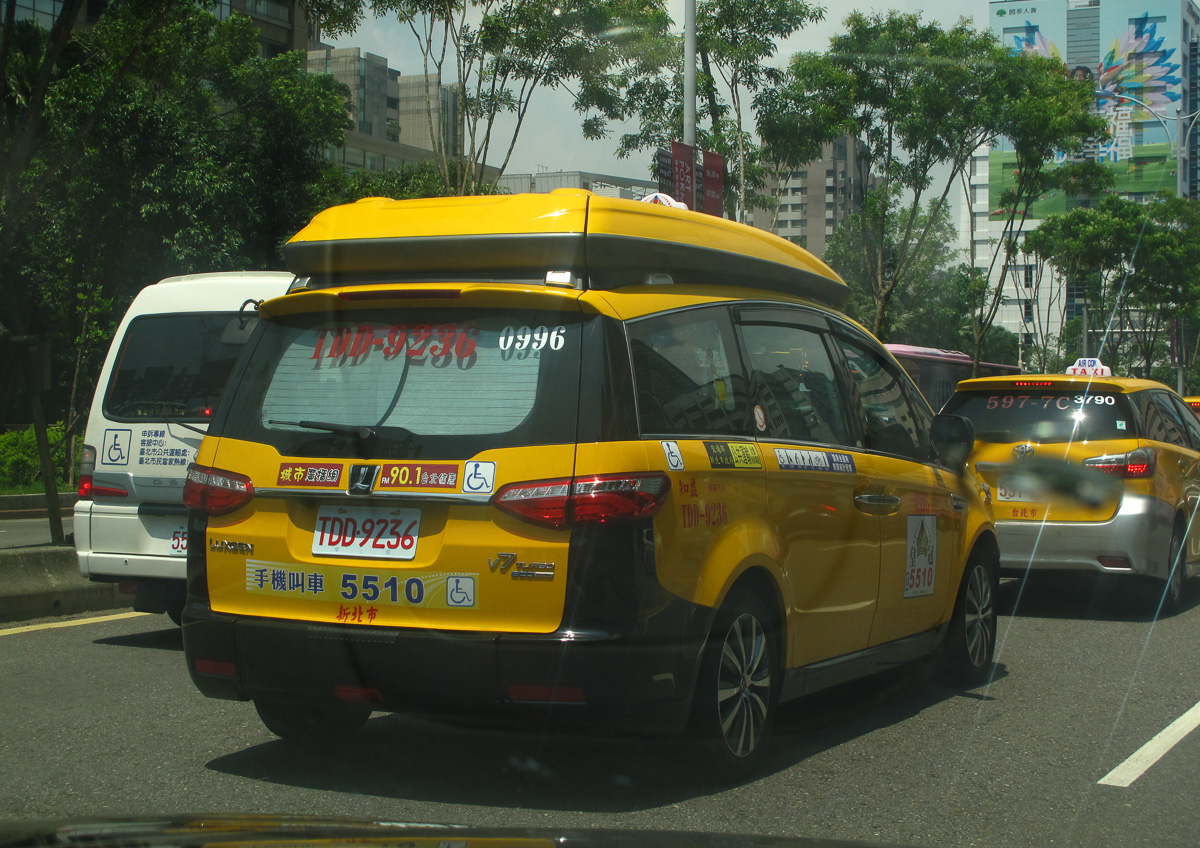
Luxgen V7 Taxi rear view
