= GO technologies =

GO technologies, inc
- Type: C Corp
- Industry: Automotive
- Founded: May 7, 2002
- Founder: Daniel Reyes
- Fate: Rebranded as Ideation, Inc.
- Successor: Ideation, Inc
- Headquarters: Santa Monica, California, United States
- Area served: US
- Key people: Daniel Reyes
- Products: Equipment for disabled drivers
- Brands: RediAuto Sport; Soft Touch; Halo
- Owner: Shareholders

From 2004 to 2008, GO technologies, inc. distributed specialized driving aids for disabled drivers under the RediAuto Sport and Soft Touch brands. Both brands offered upscale products for drivers who have little or no ability to use their feet to operate vehicle gas and brake pedals.

RediAuto Sport was marketed as “America's only supplier of sports cars for disabled drivers.” Products included a “RediAuto System” consisting of a hand-operated clutch for manual shift vehicles, a steering wheel-mounted accelerator ring, and a hand-operated brake. Soft Touch was advertised as a luxury product line and had only one product: an expensive gas and brake controller.

The company promoted motor sports for disabled drivers by supplying specially outfitted racecars, supporting drivers at local race courses, and sponsoring the RediaAuto Sport Track Challenge and the 2007 Toyota Grand Prix of Long Beach. The July 2007 issue of Motor Trend Magazine described the GO products as “The future of hand controls."

As the great recession took its toll on upscale brands and discretionary spending, GO sales fell dramatically. By the end of 2008 GO had ceased distribution of the RediAuto Sport and Soft Touch product lines and in 2009 the company began road trials on a low cost vehicle hand control system constructed of high tech polymers.

== GO Technologies ==
=== Daniel Reyes ===
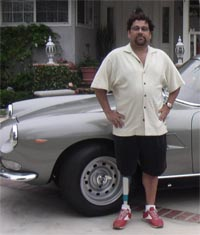
Daniel Reyes and the Ferrari that started the business.

GO technologies, inc. was incorporated in Nevada by Daniel Reyes. Mr. Reyes had been injured when he was struck by a runaway vehicle while standing at a busy intersection in West Los Angeles. The accident resulted in the amputation of his right leg above the knee. At the time of his injury, Mr. Reyes was providing product development to Mattel, and it was this manufacturing experience that gave him confidence to explore options. Initially, he founded GO technologies to develop advanced products and processes specifically for those with disabilities.

In August 2002 Mr. Reyes purchased a 1967 Ferrari 330 GT which he could not drive as it has a manual transmission and he could not operate the necessary pedals with one leg. His intent was to use this car as a development platform for specialized driving equipment. During an interview, when asked why he purchased a car he could not drive, he responded, “Being an AK (above-the-knee amputee), I had no way to drive it,” adding that he was “determined to find a way.”

Several unsuccessful attempts were made by local area fabricators to create a reliable system. In the end, Mr. Reyes traveled to Rome, Italy to purchase specialized equipment from Guidosimplex SA. Believing that others could benefit from the Italian technology, Mr. Reyes then negotiated a North American distribution exclusive.

The brands Mr. Reyes created in 2004 and 2007 to market the imported products reflected his interests and motivations: overcoming obstacles, sports cars, diabetes, and luxury, while at the same time filling a hole in the marketplace. The later Halo brand demonstrated his awareness of the societal need for continued activity by low income and temporarily disabled individuals as well as the impediments, economic and access related, that they face when trying to acquire mobility equipment. Mr. Reyes has applied technology where it can help, either by boosting egos with sports cars or by providing cheap mass manufactured equipment to those whose lives depend on having transportation.

=== Capital formation ===
Mr. Reyes provided $1.1 to 1.25 million in startup funds. In 2006, the appeal for the RediAuto Sport System was growing, and seeing a potential for sustainable growth, Mr. Reyes arranged $1 million in angel financing and sought an additional $6 million from venture capitalists. Mr. Reyes' experience in fund raising started in 1997 with an early go at internet based crowd funding when he began raising $1 million for the Destiny Pictures production of "Intimate Stranger."

=== Overcoming a negative market atmosphere ===
The GO technologies team had a dilemma with marketing and sales. Prior to the 2004 GO technologies distribution agreement other companies had unsuccessfully attempted to distribute Guidosimplex equipment in the US, and in 2004 an importer of similar disability equipment from the French company, Kempf, had underperformed with regard to disability dealers and driver rehabilitation specialist's expectations.

Industry practice for disability dealers requires the specific recommendation of particular equipment by a driver rehab specialist before any equipment will be installed in a client's vehicle. Rehab specialists will not recommend an equipment unless it is locally available and the prospective client has been tested with it. In one case, a paraplegic driver in the Northeast specifically requested the RediAuto System be installed in his new Mini Cooper and BMW was willing to fully underwrite the installation, but he could not get his local mobility service center to provide the installation since he could not be evaluated until the equipment was installed. This chicken and the egg paradox maintains an exclusionary market wall, inhibiting the introduction of new driver disability equipment. Even an offer of free evaluation equipment for the rehab specialists proved ineffective. In this atmosphere, GO technologies had no immediate openings for wide distribution in the normal disability sales channels.

==== Position branding and marketing ====
To work around these issues GO technologies developed demographic driven brands with narrow market targets and alternative sales channels. This allowed consumers to base their decisions on the appropriateness of the product, rather than on perceived availability. The Soft Touch bypassed disability dealers completely and was marketed at upscale new car dealerships.

==== Public relations ====
The future of hand controls.

— The editors of Motor Trend on the RediAuto System.
The RediAuto Sport push into motor sports presented an opportunity for mainstream media to address a disability issue with positive spin.

In house marketing maven, Veronica Verve, reached out to motor sports enthusiasts, veterans, community service programs, and the media, creating substantial buzz around the unique concept of racing with disabilities. Ms. Verve communicated the GO experience through press releases, social media and blogs, and personal appearances, often giving members of the press humbling driving lessons.

=== Brands ===
==== RediAuto Sport ====
===== Motivation =====
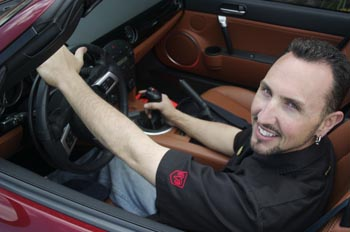
Steve Bucaro in 2005 Mazda MX5 outfitted with RediAuto Sport System. Photo by Veronica Verve.

The RediAuto Sport brand was marketed to disabled and paraplegic drivers as a thrilling alternative to Van or SUV based transportation. Mr. Reyes' enthusiasm for sports cars and his attitude towards overcoming obstacles was infectious. The customer base was almost entirely composed of young men who had been injured in motorcycle accidents. Billing the brand as "America's only supplier of sports cars for disabled drivers" was an effective marketing lead.

===== Means =====
Sports cars were made accessible to drivers with limited physical capabilities by equipping the cars with the necessary components to convert manual transmission vehicles to hand operation. This was achieved by transferring the clutch control to a small lever located on the gear shift knob; the brake control to a lever to the right of the lower portion of the steering wheel; and the gas control to an accelerator “ring” which was situated either in front of or behind the steering wheel. The system was easy to learn.

Clients could either have a vehicle of their own converted or they could purchase an entire new vehicle with the conversion in place. GO had arranged discounts with Galpin Ford for the purchase of new Mustangs for this purpose. The advantages to the new car purchase was the ability to arrange financing for the total package through Ford Mobility Finance with Ford Mobility additionally reimbursing the buyer $1,200 for the purchase price of the conversion equipment. As the cost of the conversion was usually in the $10,000 - $12,000 price range, this arrangement made sense to many people.

Demo cars

- 1967 Ferrari 330 GT
- 2001 Mazda Miata
- 2005 Mazda MX5
- 2005 Ford Mustang convertible

Notable Clients
Professional race car drivers:

- Carol Hollfelder - Ms. Hollfelder was in a motorcycle accident, resulting in a damaged spinal cord.
- Lance Magin - Mr. Magin was in a motorcycle accident.

Amateur drivers:

- Steve Bucaro - Mr. Bucaro was in a motorcycle accident.
- Cody Unser - Ms. Unser was struck by transverse myelitis in the 6th grade.

==== Soft Touch ====
===== Motivation =====
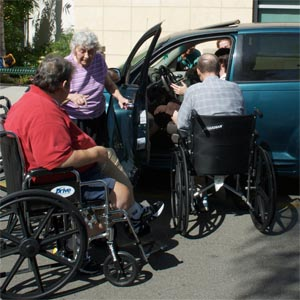
Mutual Aid Amputee Foundation conference attendees examining the Soft Touch hand controls.

The Soft Touch was a second thought for GO technologies. Introduced at the 2006 SEMA Expo the product was intended to fill out a hole in the product line by providing equipment to sporty, yet not full-fledged sports car enthusiasts.

===== Diabetes =====
During marketing trials for the Soft Touch it became clear that the major user base was late middle age to elder people with advanced stages of type 1 and type 2 diabetes. These clients generally had peripheral neuropathy which made it difficult to judge the amount of pressure they were applying to the gas and brake pedals. Knowing that diabetics would comprise the lion's share of clients the name Soft Touch was chosen due to its similarity to "One Touch," a popular brand of blood glucose monitors.

===== Means =====
The Soft Touch brand consisted of one product marketed to upscale drivers with a moderate disability related to their feet. Many of the actual users were inflicted with complications arising from diabetes and multiple sclerosis.

On the plus side, where typical vehicle hand controls are attached low and to the left of the steering wheel, the Soft Touch was higher and on the right, which made for easy access when entering or exiting the vehicle, and it was extremely simple to use. On the minus side, the Soft Touch was handmade in Italy from aircraft-quality aluminum with leather-covered hand grips and sold for close to double the cost of standard models, at roughly $1,800.

Demo cars

- 2000 Jaguar S-Type
- 2001 Chrysler PT Cruiser

=== Location ===
RediAuto Sport and Soft Touch were managed out of a small office suite in Santa Monica, CA.

== Halo ==
=== Development ===
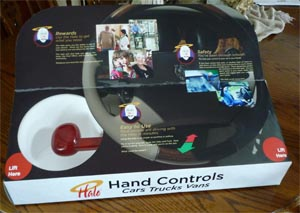
Red samples going out into the field for testing.

Development began on the low cost entry level hand controls in 2008. The motivating factors were directed from exposure to diabetics and veterans. They brought to light the lack of access to equipment for low income individuals and individuals outside of the mainstream socioeconomic structure.

=== New ideas ===
Existing hand controls have been around for a long time. Long enough that substantial data exists to allow many improvements.

In order to substantially lower costs the new hand controls were developed entirely from scratch and with polymer processes in mind. This approach allowed the designs to solve problems a more evolutionary process would not, including forming the hand grip in an ergonomic shape for people with arthritis and simplifying installation.

Legacy equipment has injured crash test dummies during sled testing. The use of polymers and advanced engineering software has the benefit of creating energy absorbing shapes.

=== Testing ===
The hand controls are being tested to exceed SAE guidelines for Automotive Adaptive Driver Controls, which mandates weather exposure, vibration, and cycle testing. The Easy Touch hand controls have been undergoing these tests and road trials since 2009.

== Motorsports ==
=== Toyota Grand Prix of Long Beach ===
==== Pace car ====
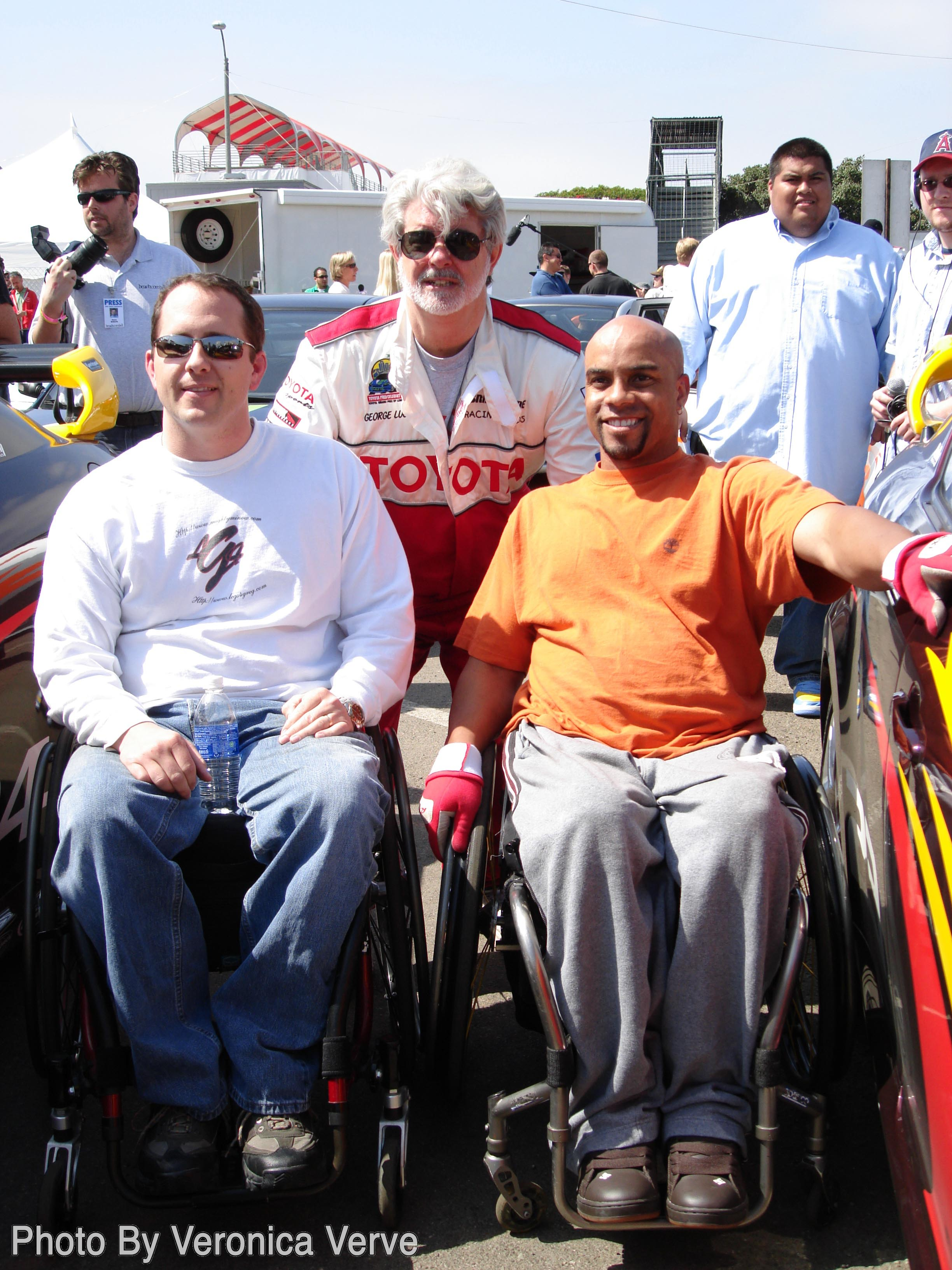
RediAuto Sport Track Challenge Competitors Greg Minnow and Major Lewis Jr. with George Lucas at the 2007 Toyota Grand Prix of Long Beach. Photo by Veronica Verve.

In 2007 the Toyota Grand Prix of Long Beach agreed to allow a veteran, disabled in the Iraqi conflict, drive a pace car outfitted with RediAuto Sport equipment during the main race.

Toyota supplied a vehicle which was temporarily outfitted with hand brake and accelerator ring (the car was equipped with an automatic transmission and did not require a clutch controller). As part of the agreement GO became an official sponsor of the race, hosting a trackside tent during the three-day event.

=== RediAuto Sport Track Challenge ===
A nationwide search for a driver commenced with two finalists given the opportunity to race, the winner becoming the pace car driver. To facilitate this, RediAuto Sport sponsored the RediAuto Sport Track Challenge, which was held one week before the Grand Prix.

The company rented the Irwindale Speedway, and invited disabled drivers to come out to race. This was the only race where disabled drivers were specifically asked to compete. Into the mix several able bodied race drivers were invited as well with the theme becoming a competition between the two groups. Awards were given to the top three finishers in each group.

Attended by the general public, the day-long event was sponsored by Ford, Budweiser, and United Spinal. Spectators were treated to a catered lunch, disability product vendors, and a charity auction. Attending press included reporters from the New York Times, Autoweek, San Gabriel Valley Tribune, and ABC Television news. The race to qualify the driver of the Long Beach Grand Prix pace car was won by Major Lewis, who just edged out fellow Iraqi vet Greg Minnow by 1 second.

==== Participants ====
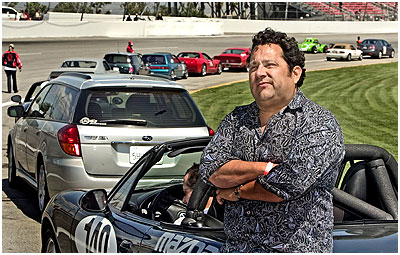
Daniel Reyes at the staging lineup for the RediAuto Track Challenge. Photo by Walt Mancini

Disabled participants included:

- John Box
- Steve Bucarro
- Stewart Goddard
- Carol Hollfelder
- Clair Russell Hesselton
- Major Lewis
- Lance Magin
- Greg Minnow
- Ray Paprota
- Daniel Reyes
- Cody Unser
- Briana Walker

==== Winners ====
Disabled Drivers:

1. Stewart Goddard
2. Daniel Reyes
3. Clair Russell Hesselton

=== Mazda Miata Race Trainer ===
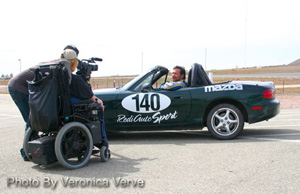
Documentary producer Jenny Gold with paraplegic race car driver Lance Magin at Willow Springs Race Track. Photo by Veronica Verve.

GO technologies maintained a 2001 Mazda Miata outfitted by Mazdaspeed and conforming to SCCA regulations. This car was used to encourage disabled drivers to experience racing. Mr. Reyes felt that giving people the opportunity to do an "impossible thing" would broaden their self acceptance and alleviate the depression associated with traumatic injuries.

Driving clinics were held on weekends for beginners in the streets surrounding the company's Camarillo, CA warehouse. More experienced drivers were given the opportunity to drive the car at Willow Springs International Motorsports Park, north of Los Angeles and a few at the Irwindale track.

"Stop & Go," one of a series of videos produced by Gold Pictures, Inc. for the Christopher & Dana Reeve Foundation was shot at Willow Springs and featured Lance Magin in the Miata trainer.

== See also ==
- Adapted automobile
