= Wheelchair ramp =

Incline allowing wheelchair users to move between areas of different height

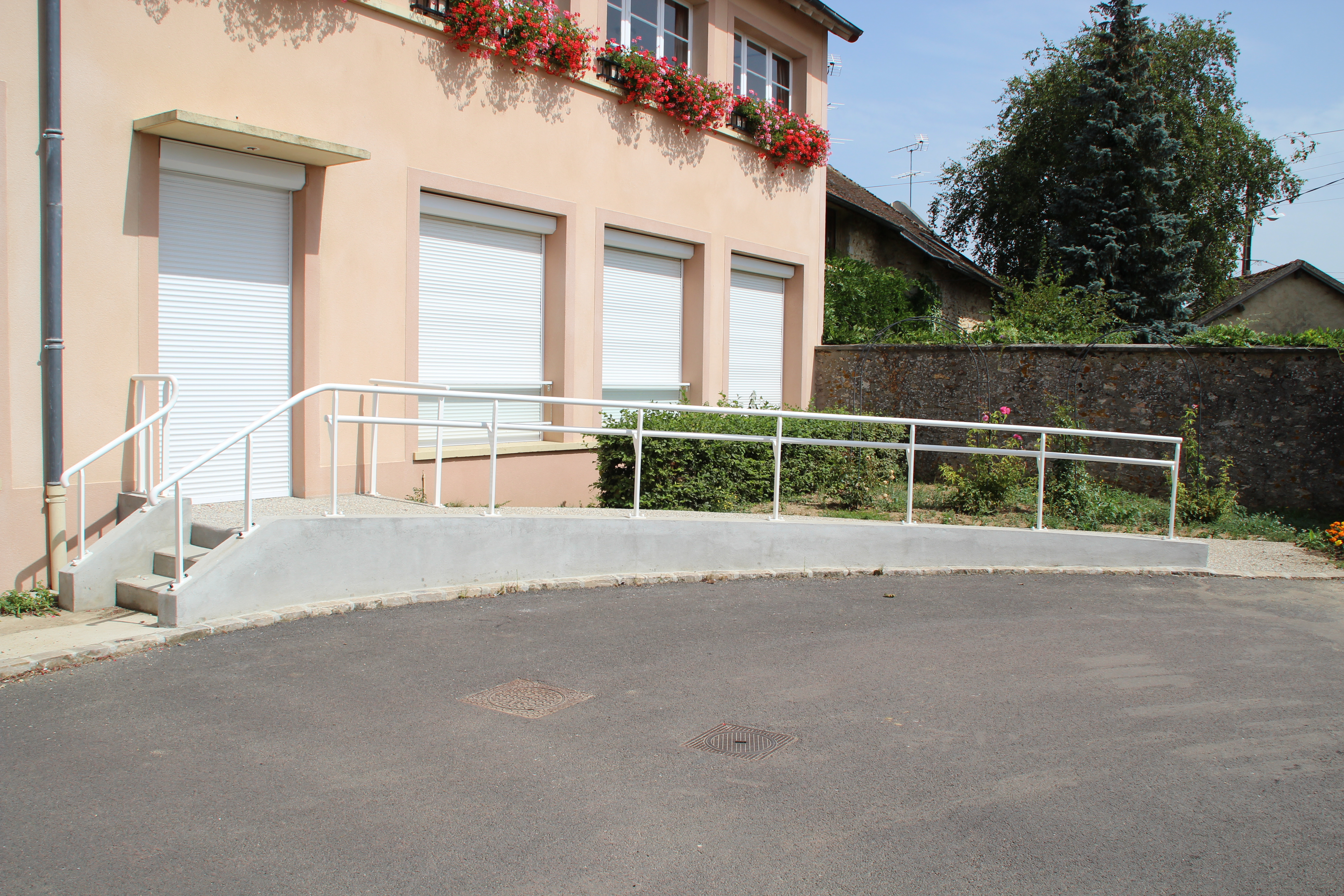
A concrete wheelchair ramp

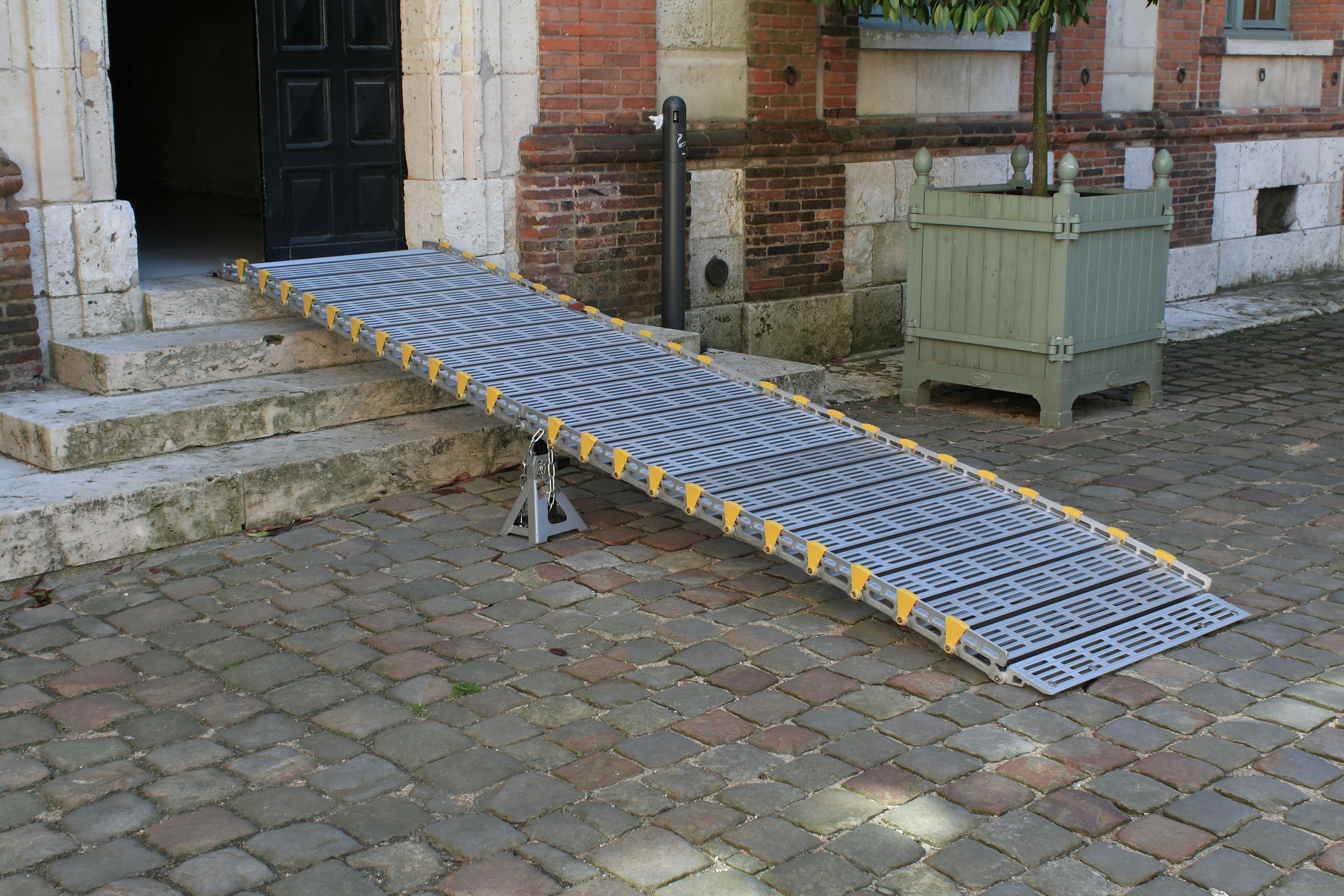
A portable wheelchair ramp

A wheelchair ramp is an inclined plane installed in addition to or instead of stairs. Ramps permit wheelchair users, as well as people pushing strollers, carts, or other wheeled objects, to more easily access a building, or navigate between areas of different height. Ramps for accessibility may predate the wheelchair and are found in ancient Greece.

A wheelchair ramp can be permanent, semi-permanent or portable. Permanent ramps are designed to be bolted or otherwise attached in place. Semi-permanent ramps rest on top of the ground or concrete pad and are commonly used for the short term. Permanent and semi-permanent ramps are usually of aluminum, concrete or wood. Portable ramps are usually aluminum and typically fold for ease of transport. Portable ramps are primarily intended for home and building use but can also be used with vans to load an unoccupied mobility device or to load an occupied mobility device when both the device and the passenger are easy to handle.

Ramps must be carefully designed in order to be useful. In many places, laws dictate a ramp's minimum width and maximum slope.

In general, reduced incline rises are easier for wheelchair users to traverse and are safer in icy climates. However, they consume more space and require traveling a greater distance to go up. Hence, in some cases it is preferable to include an elevator or other type of wheelchair lift.

In many countries, wheelchair ramps and other features to facilitate universal access are required by building code when constructing new facilities which are open to the public. Internationally, the United Nations Convention on the Rights of Persons with Disabilities mandates nations take action to "enable persons with disabilities to live independently and participate fully in all aspects of life." Among other requirements, it compels countries to institute "minimum standards and guidelines..." for accessibility.

== Design standards ==
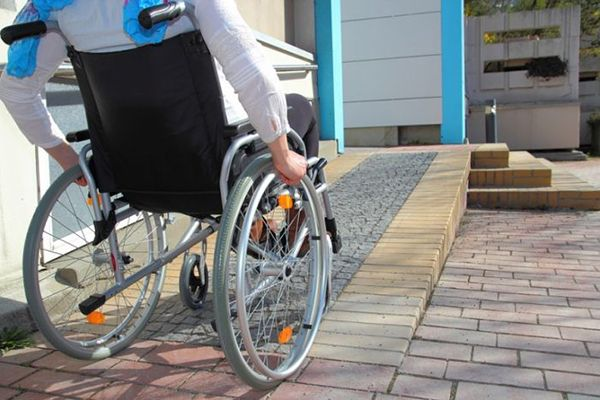
Access to the ramp in a wheelchair

In the US, the Americans with Disabilities Act (ADA) requires a slope of no more than 1:12 for wheelchairs and scooters for business and public use, which works out to 1 foot (305 mm) of ramp for each one inch (25.4 mm) of rise. For example, a 20-inch (510 mm) rise requires a minimum of 20 feet (6.10 m) in length of ramp. Additionally, ramps can be as long as needed but ADA limits the longest single span of ramp, prior to a rest or turn platform, to 30 feet (9.14 m). Residential Applications usually are not required to meet ADA standards (ADA is a commercial code).

The UK's guidelines as recommended by the Disability Discrimination Act 1995 and Equality Act 2010 are a maximum of 1:12 for ramps (with exceptions for existing buildings) "Ramps should be as shallow as possible. The maximum permissible gradient is 1:12 [...], with the occasional exception in the case of short, steeper ramps when refitting existing buildings."

In Hong Kong, wheelchair ramps may not exceed a 1:12 slope, except in some situations under the Barrier Free Access (BFA) terms.

In South Africa 1:12 is the maximum slope unless the difference in level is less than 400 mm, in which case it is 1:10. [SANS 10400-S SS2(a)].

In Australia, the National Construction Code requires a wheelchair ramp to have a maximum incline of 1 in 8. This means that for every 8 metres (26 ft 3 in) travelled horizontally, the ramp rises 1 metre (3 ft 3 in). The wheelchair ramp must also have a minimum width of 1 metre (3 ft 3 in).

== Vehicle ramps ==
Vehicles such as buses, trams, taxis, cars and vans may include a ramp to facilitate entry and exit for all. These may be built-in or portable designs. Most major automotive companies offer rebates for portable ramps and mobility access equipment for new vehicles. Access to buses and trams may involve a retractable ramp.

== See also ==
- Adapted automobile
- Bridge plate (mechanism)
- Sidewalk curb wheelchair ramp
- Wheelchair lift
