= Cars for wheelchair users =

A range of small vehicles have been produced by various manufacturers since the 1950s that have been specifically designed to be driven by a wheelchair user, without the need for the user to transfer from the wheelchair. This distinguishes them from the majority of adapted cars, which are designed to be driven from a conventional driver's seat, whether the driver is a wheelchair user or otherwise impaired. They can be considered a sub-class of wheelchair accessible vehicles, which are predominantly converted mass-production models.

== History ==
Makers of cars for wheelchair users included AC Cars in England, Fend in West Germany, Simson DUO in East Germany, SMZ in the Soviet Union and Velorex in Czechoslovakia.

The Duo was made initially by VEB Fahrzeugbau und Ausrüstungen Brandis (VEB FAB) from 1973 until 1978, whereupon manufacture was transferred to VEB Robur, more famous for making trucks in Zittau. Because many of the components are common with the Simson, the Duo is often classified as a Simson. Production ceased in 1989.

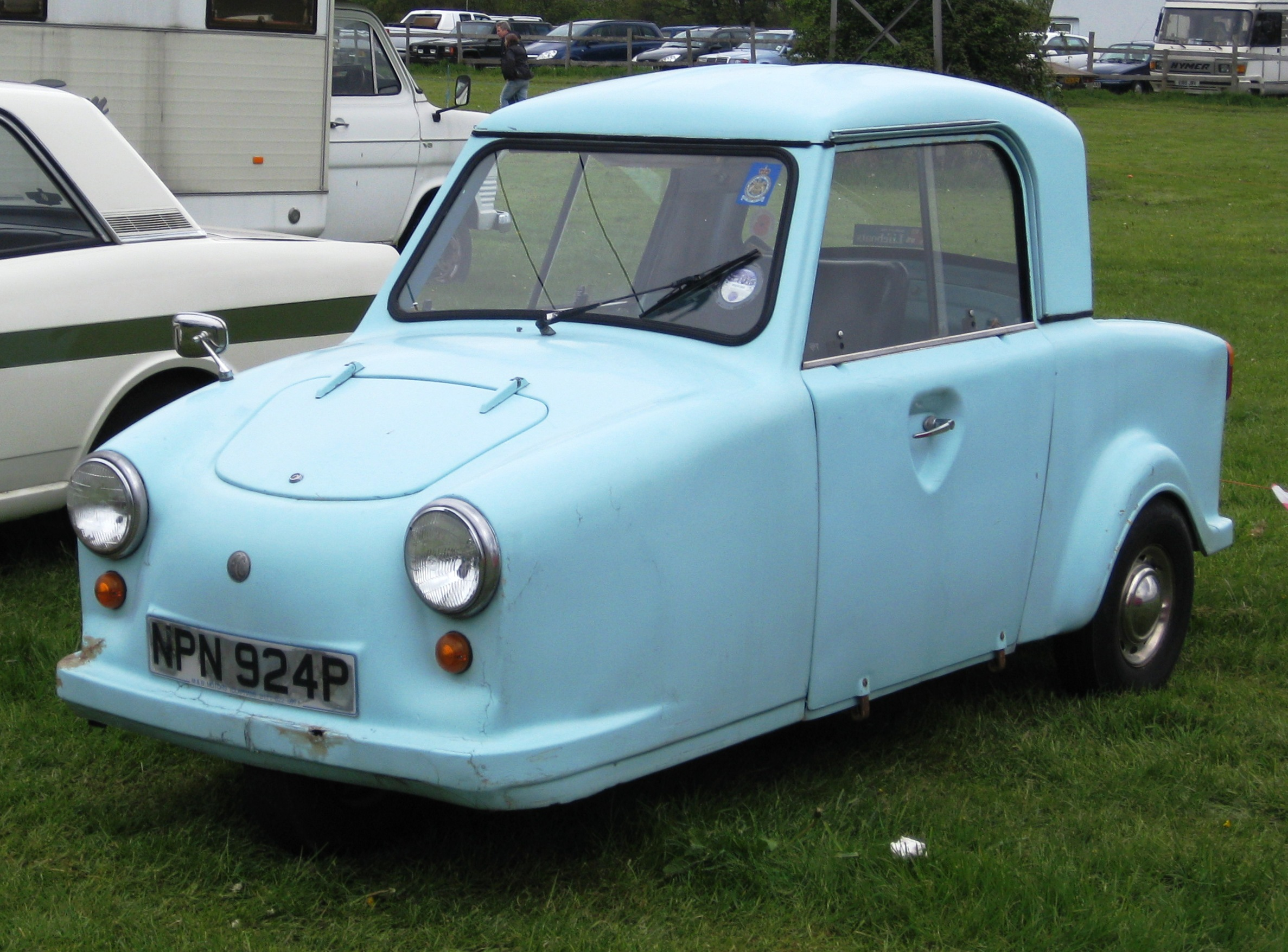
AC built Invacar 1976

In the United Kingdom in the 1960s and 1970s, the Invacar was a low-cost, low-maintenance vehicle designed specifically for people with physical disabilities. Vehicles supplied by the National Health Service had three wheels and were very lightweight, and therefore their suitability on roads amongst other traffic was often considered dubious on safety grounds. The last ones were withdrawn from the road in 2003, 27 years after the end of production, though some are still in existence. A 1976 example, one of the last made, is on display at the National Motor Museum in Hampshire.

== Recent production models ==
Several models are currently being produced:

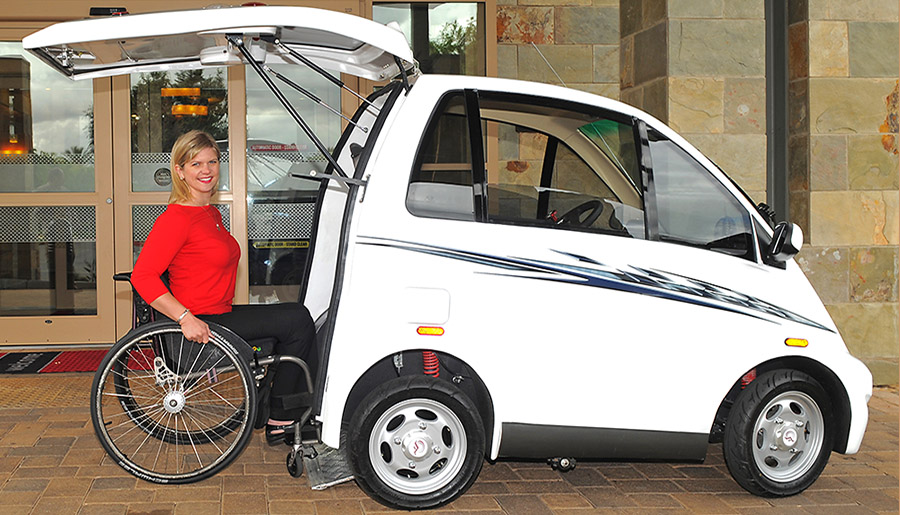
Chairiot solo

- Chairiot solo has been developed and sold in North America by Chairiot Mobility Inc., based in Riverside, California. It is a battery-electric car, classified as a low-speed or neighborhood electric vehicle, capable of traveling 40–50 miles at a speed of 25 mph (35 mph in some US jurisdictions). It features a large rear door and ramp that allows a wheelchair user to roll in and drive off.

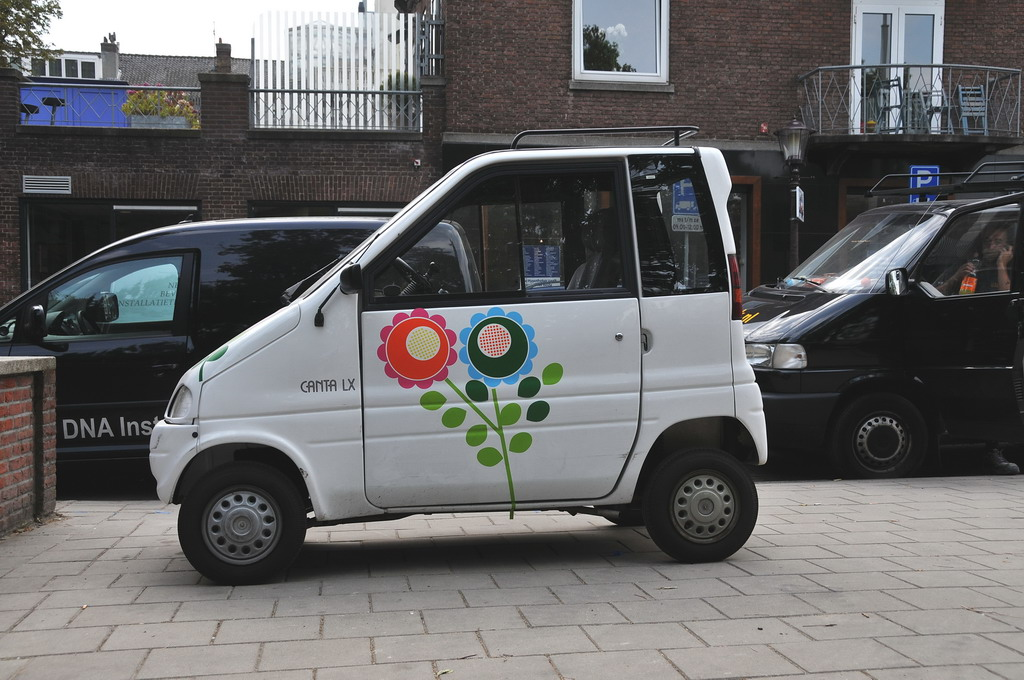
Canta LX

- Inrij-Canta by Dutch carmaker Waaijenberg. It has a pneumatic lift built in that raises the car up after the wheelchair rolls in at ground level.
- Kenguru (Hungarian for kangaroo), designed by Istvan Kissaroslaki, who moved from Hungary to Texas, where he secured investment. However, as of 2017 the vehicle has not gone into full production. It is an electric car, capable of going up to 25 miles per hour, designed for local use, with an estimated range of 60 miles.
- Elbee is a vehicle created by Czech company ZLKL. The vehicle is officially categorised as a "heavy all-terrain vehicle" and has a maximum speed of 80 km/h. It uses a unique mechanism to allow the user to roll into or out of the vehicle: the user enters through a door at the front which hinges upwards. Compact dimensions allow for parking perpendicular to the pavement, so a wheelchair user can comfortably exit the vehicle directly onto the pavement rather than the road. The vehicle can accommodate one passenger at the rear.

== See also ==
- Mobility scooter
- Wheelchair accessible van
