= Wheelchair accessible van =

Van equipped for carrying a wheelchair

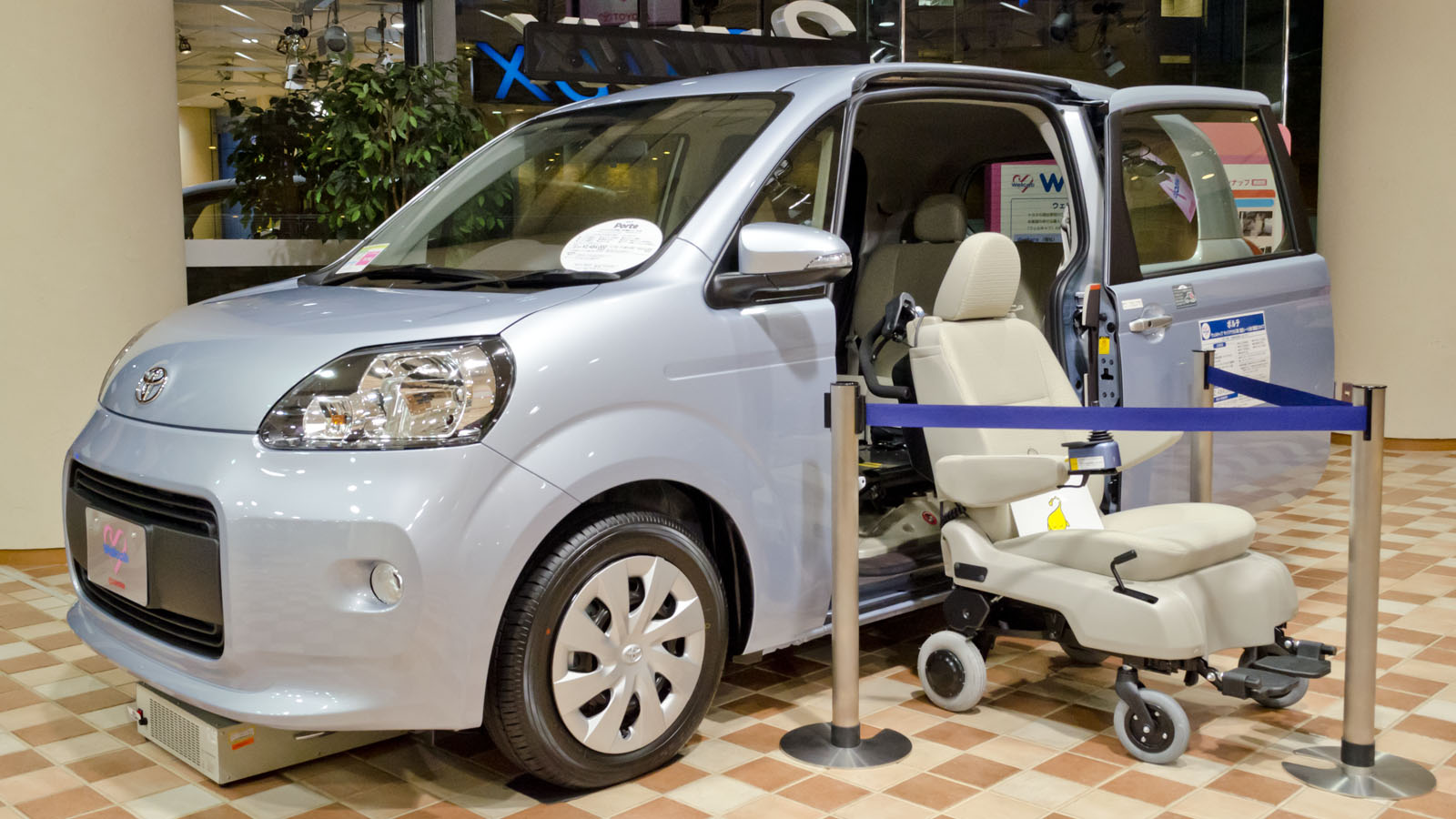
Toyota Porte Welcab (2012)

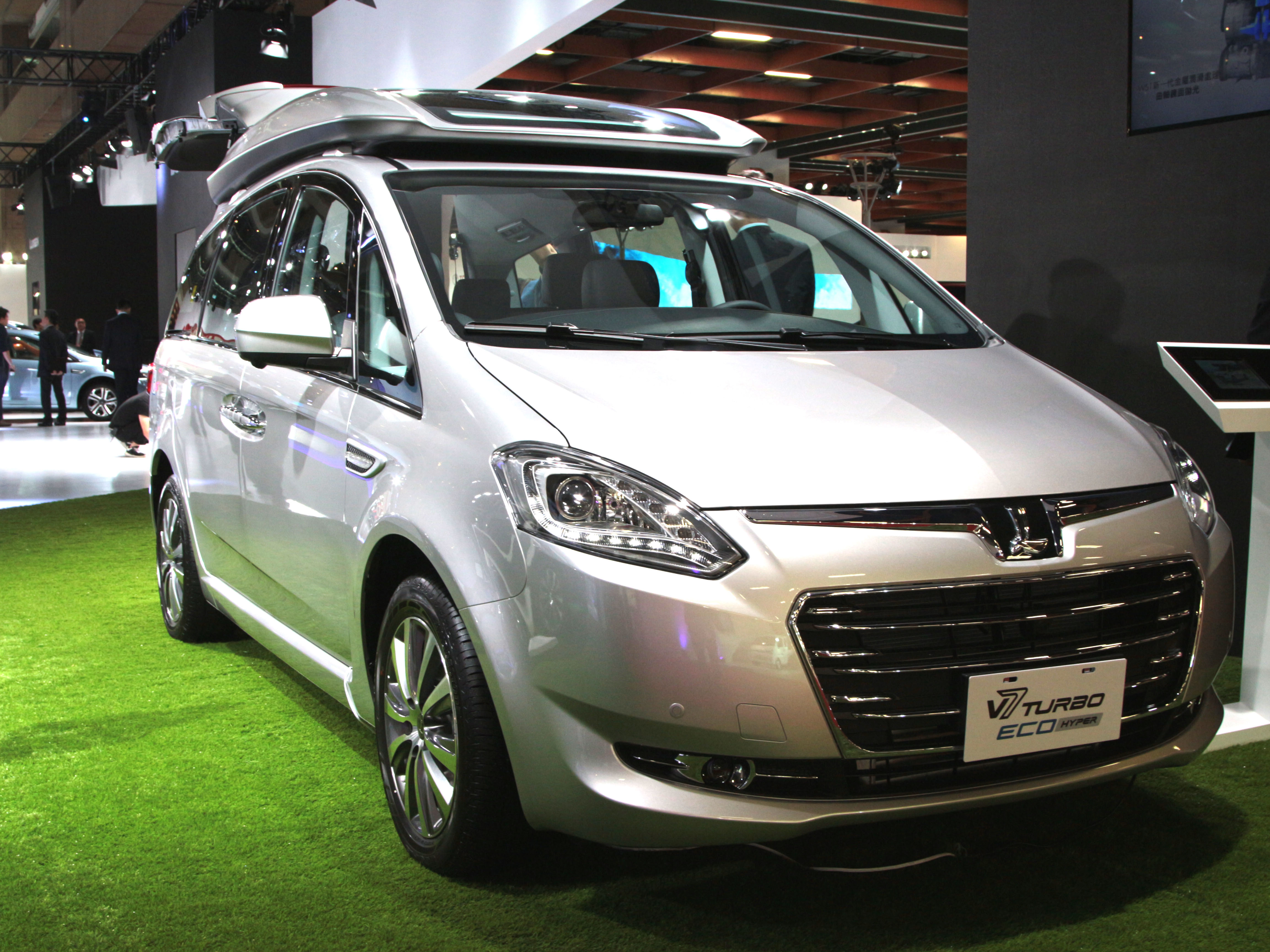
Luxgen V7 front view

A wheelchair-accessible van is a vehicle that has been modified by increasing the interior size of the vehicle and equipping it with a means of wheelchair entry, such as a wheelchair ramp or powered lift.

== Modifications ==
The general steps manufacturers undergo to convert a van differ greatly from one manufacturer to another. Modifications fall into two categories: the first is where the individual in a wheelchair is the driver and the second is where the individual in a wheelchair is a passenger.

Conversions generally involve the following:

- Some portion of the floor is lowered typically from the rear seats forward to the firewall
- Floors are typically lowered 10" to 14" on a minivan for side entry accessibility and a standard 10" for a rear entry
- An ADA compliant accessible van must meet certain requirements such as; a door height opening of 56" or greater, a ramp width of at least 30" in width, with ramp edges 2" high, and finally a ramp angle of a 6:1 ratio or rise
- A rear entry converted minivan is widely used by NEMT or Non-Emergency Medical Transportation providers as the rear entry conversion provides the easiest provision to transport and accommodate wheelchair passengers. Despite the fact that the Americans with Disabilities Act (ADA) does not extend its jurisdiction to private Non-Emergency Medical Transportation (NEMT) vehicles, individual states frequently establish separate regulations that mandate NEMT vans to adhere to ADA stipulations.
- Rear entry converted vans are typically manufactured with a manual ramp, are ADA compliant and will accommodate 99% of all wheelchairs, scooters and people
- Seating is modified to allow wheelchair access. In certain cases the front seats are removable allowing a wheelchair to be positioned in either the front driver or passenger position or ride amidships. Second row seats are removed altogether providing the lowered floor footprint allowing room for the wheelchair user to turn and sit in a forward-facing direction
- Means of external access added (This is most often a ramp, lift, or rotating seat) A rotating seat or (Turney Seat) will lower outside the vehicle allowing the individual to ambulate from the vehicle seat to the wheelchair or vice versa. Turney Seats are not typically found on a lowered floor accessible van as they are utilized by people with reduced mobility not seated in a wheelchair 100% of the time
- Suspension in the rear of the vehicle is typically raised via taller springs to allow extra weight and increased ground clearance partially compensating the lowered floor. Higher quality vehicles typically raise all four corners of the vehicle to preserve OEM driving characteristics.
- A power kneeling system is often added to side entry conversions to reduce the slope of the ramp, however, is not necessary in all cases. The geometry of newer models allows the vehicle to maintain OEM ground clearance and ADA standards without a kneeling system. While power chair users are able to ingress and egress effortlessly because of the powered wheelchair, wheel slipping is a severe safety issue and so ramp angle is critical.
- Most kneel systems are very simplistic in design as a stainless steel cable pinches the frame to the rear axle creating a lower angle for entry and exit. A modern system by FR Conversions retracts the suspension into the chassis body rather than compressing it, providing an exceptionally low effort entry for manual wheelchair users. Kneel systems are often recommended when the primary passenger is an unattended manual wheelchair user, usually is the driver of the vehicle or the typical usage evaluation indicates multiple entries / exits daily. NEMT, commercial or accessible Taxis are usually manual ramp, non-kneeling configurations.
- Gas tanks and fuel lines may be modified, brake lines and mufflers rerouted, door panels extended, electrical systems modified, etc. Modifications are far more extensive in a side-entry conversion versus a rear entry.
- The vehicle is certified to meet the safety requirements of the country in which it is to be used.
- Crash testing and or certification is not mandated by any governing authority. However any credible manufacturer will crash test and certify with NHTSA (National Highway Traffic Safety Administration) to meet all vehicle safety crash test standards.
- Tie-down points are added or referred to as L-track, which is the receiver that the tie-downs or commonly used Q-Straint 4 point tie down system click(s) into to secure the wheelchair occupant. Regular and independent users of the same vehicle often use a docking lock device where an installed pin on the wheelchair docks into a crash-tested locking receiver. These devices, made by EZLock and Q-Straint, greatly facilitate loading and unloading. They are required for unattended wheelchair drivers. All wheelchair users must be secured with traditional seat belts while in the moving vehicle.

Passenger conversions on buses or full size vans involve the following:

- The floor is reinforced and floor applique is added.
- Typically "L" track is installed on the floor, and in some cases ( in the Pro Master) on the walls, to accommodate tie downs, seat and shoulder belts.
- Seats are added
- AMF-Bruns of America, Q'Straint (or Wheelchair) tiedowns/securements are installed
- The lift platform installed, can be in the side, rear or under the vehicle.
- Windows installed (in some cases)
- Van lining (finishing)

== Entry configurations ==
There are two types of entry configurations: side-entry and rear-entry. The entry location impacts wheelchair seating positions, parking options, the ability to accommodate other passengers, and storage availability.

=== Side entry ===
Advantages of a side-entry configuration include the ability to drive from a wheelchair or sit in the front passenger position in a wheelchair or driver position, the ability to enter and exit curbside away from traffic, and more storage space. Disadvantages of this style are that it requires an accessible parking space or extra room for ramp deployment and that some driveways are not wide enough to accommodate the vehicle. About 65% of personal use wheelchair-accessible vehicles employ a side-entry configuration. Side entry vehicles can accommodate 5 passengers at most and are typically limited by total maximum load because of the extra weight of the conversion and often cannot seat more than 2-3 passengers based on total weight.

=== Rear entry ===
A rear-entry configuration can be used for attended applications in which the wheelchair occupant is not driving the vehicle but rather riding as a passenger. Rear entry vehicles are simpler, much less costly, require virtually no extra maintenance. Ride and drive quality are very similar to an unconverted vehicle. They will fit into any garage. Other advantages of a rear-entry vehicle is that, with the exception of parallel parking, no extra room is required for a ramp, and the side passenger doors aren't blocked. In addition, mid-passenger seats can be mounted next to the wheelchair position. Other advantages include more ground clearance and more room for long wheelchairs and/or leg rests. One manufacturer (FR Conversions) makes a 48" wide RE ramp. The widest in the industry which can handle virtually any wheelchair.

Rear entry vehicles are often converted from good used vehicles into a "Used / New" configuration which is much more affordable and places a wheelchair accessible vehicle within reach of many in need who otherwise could not afford one. It is a great 'starter" vehicle for consumers who are unsure of which configuration would work best and is a good entry point from a wheelchair carrier to one where transferring is no longer necessary.

Limitations of the rear-entry style are the requirement to enter and exit from a traffic area although no special parking space is required. The inability to drive from the wheelchair and/or have the wheelchair in the front passenger position and less storage space are disadvantages. Rear entry vehicles are available in two configurations. Long cut and short or taxi cut. The long cut handles two wheelchairs the short cut one. Seating can be arranged so rear-entry vehicles can seat up to 6-8 passengers.

== Types of access ==
=== Ramp ===
Ramp-based modifications are most commonly performed on minivans. To provide access for the wheelchair user, the floor on side-entry vehicles is lowered 8–12 in (203–305 mm). In rear-entry configuration, the floor is not lowered but rather removed and a composite or steel tub is inserted.

Ramps come in two styles: fold-up or in-floor and two operating modes: manual or motorised. Fold-up ramps fold in half and stow upright next to the side passenger door in a side-entry configuration or inside the rear access doors in a rear-entry configuration. Fold-up ramps present a lower ramp angle than in-floor ramps; however, in side-entry configurations, they are in the way of the passenger entrance when stowed. In-floor ramps slide into a pocket underneath the vehicle's floor and are only available for side-entry configurations.

Folding ramps are available in manual or motorized versions for both entry configurations. Older style applications may also have a "kneeling feature" that reduces the angle of the ramp by compressing the suspension of the van on the ramp side, newer ones using complex geometry eliminate the need for kneeling to meet ADA standards although they may employ a retracting system as an option, that eliminates the stress of compressing the suspension.

Some other advantages of the fold-out ramp for the side entry vehicle are that an unaccompanied wheelchair driver can "self-rescue" if a system failure and not become trapped in the vehicle; ramp deployment onto a sidewalk or over a curb is sometimes only possible with a fold-out ramp because it will deploy out and over the curb; in very snowy climates the ramp remains inside the vehicle, away from the weather. A secondary disadvantage of the side entry fold-out ramp is that they rattle inside the vehicle. Modern, solenoid controlled ramps with actuators on both sides of the ramp are self tightening and eliminate the issue.

The primary advantages of the in-floor ramp configuration are that ambulatory passengers have access to the vehicle from the curbside of the vehicle; and the ramp is stowed under the floor. The possible disadvantages are that the ramp cannot overcome or deploy onto higher curbs, snow and ice may be retained in the ramp's "tray"; not all models are ADA compliant because of the ramp's side edge height and self-rescue is not possible.

In addition, portable ramps are available for use with many vehicles and typically do not require any vehicle modification. Portable wheelchair ramps cost much less both to purchase and to maintain. Since they are not attached to the vehicle, they can also be used for other access applications.

Minivans that are most frequently converted:

- The Dodge Grand Caravan and Chrysler Town and Country were the most common converted vehicle because of cost and length of the production run, the success, of the chassis. They will continue to be converted in the "Used / New" space for years to come.
- The Chrysler Pacifica, the successor to the Town and Country and the more popularly priced Voyager are currently available and expected to replace the volume and position of the Grand Caravan in the wheelchair accessible conversion space.
- The Toyota Sienna is the second most converted chassis. It is due for some major updates in subsequent model years but is expected to retain its position in the market with several conversion configurations.
- The Honda Odyssey, a distant 3rd in market share in the market, is available from several converters in a side entry, in-floor configuration and considered by some to be the most "upscale" of the chassis adapted for wheelchair use.
- For full-size vans, the Ram ProMaster dominates the market because of its interior volume, capacity, front wheel drive and ability to handle wheelchairs of any size.

Some manufacturers also provide wheelchair accessible versions of their out-going vehicles, like Luxgen did with their M7.

=== Platform lifts ===
Full-size vans require lifts in the form of a platform that can be raised and lowered from inside the vehicle down to the ground outside. Many types of lifts are available on the market. Mono-arm lifts, double-arm lifts and under vehicle (UVL) lifts. Double-arm and underbody lifts are best-able for bigger vehicles such as minibuses or buses used for public transport. They have a bigger platform and higher load capacity, so they are suitable even for heavy electric wheelchairs with a heavy occupant (more than 600lbs in all). A mono-arm Lift is preferable for private transport because it can fit smaller vehicles. A mono-arm lift is lighter and smaller than the other ones and it ensures a clear view when it is installed in the back of the car. Moreover, mono-arm lifts are preferable for the side-door installation because they are thinner than a double-arm.

=== Other types ===
Crane type lifts are combined with seats that turn and lower to the ground as a means of providing wheelchair access to some types of vehicles.

Some companies offer the option of a "transfer seat", in which the front driver's or passenger's seat moves on a track back to the wheelchair's position allowing the wheelchair user to transfer into the OEM front seat and then move the seat back into its original position. The conversion is very simple and does not carry the complicated engineering and electronics typically found in a side-entry conversion. As a result, they are very well suited for commercial and heavy-cycle applications (i.e.-taxi, non-emergency ambulance, paratransit, assisted living, and dial-a-ride) and geographic areas prone to vehicle corrosion from salt and chloride usage on highways in winter seasons.

== See also ==
- Car for wheelchair users
- Adapted automobile
- Walter Harris Callow, inventor of wheelchair accessible bus
- Bridge plate (mechanism)
- Wheelchair accessibility
- Wheelchair accessible taxi
- Wheelchair ramp
