= Adapted automobile =

Automobile adapted for ease of use by disabled people

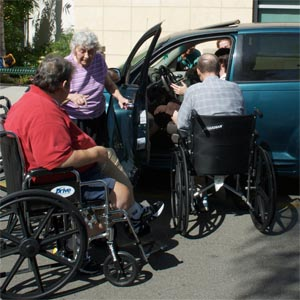
Mutual Aid Amputee Foundation conference attendees examining hand controls

An adapted automobile is an automobile adapted for ease of use by people with disabilities. Automobiles, whether cars or vans, can be adapted for a range of physical disabilities.

== Hand controls ==
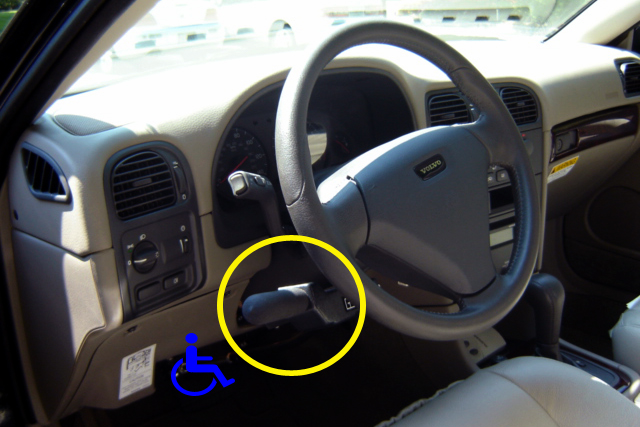
Left side hand bar control (hand-operated device) to allow a disabled person to drive an automatic car without using their feet

Foot pedals can be raised, relocated (for instance swapped to be used by the opposite leg) or replaced with hand-controlled devices. The common form of hand controls consists of a push-pull handle mounted below and projecting to the side of the steering wheel housing. The bar connects by levers to the accelerator and brake pedals, and is typically pivoted so that pushing applies the accelerator while pulling applies the brake. As there is no facility to work a clutch pedal, hand controls must generally be used in cars with automatic transmissions. One exception is the GuidoSimplex Semi-Automatic Syncro Drive Clutch System along with an over/under ring accelerator and hand controlled brake, a car with a manual gearbox can be adapted. With one hand continuously engaged working the hand controls, the steering wheel will generally also be fitted with a steering knob to allow one-handed use. More complex fittings may also connect into the electronic circuitry of the vehicle to place indicator and other switches in easy reach of the driver without requiring them to release the hand controls or steering knob. A guard plate may be fitted to prevent inadvertent contact between the driver's feet and the pedals. Extension levers or adapted grips may also be fitted to the parking brake to allow it to be applied by a driver with limited hand or arm strength.

Adaptations may be individually customized and in more extensive adaptations the traditional pedals and steering wheel may be entirely replaced by a joystick control, or by a secondary mini-steering wheel adapted for users with restricted grip and/or arm movement. Steering knobs may also be adapted for users with restricted grip, using a three-pronged tetra-grip, or for users with a prosthetic hook.

Ergonomic adaptations, such as repositioned mirrors and adapted seating may also be needed and some larger vehicles may be fitted to allow them to be driven directly from a wheelchair.

== Wheelchair and mobility device access ==
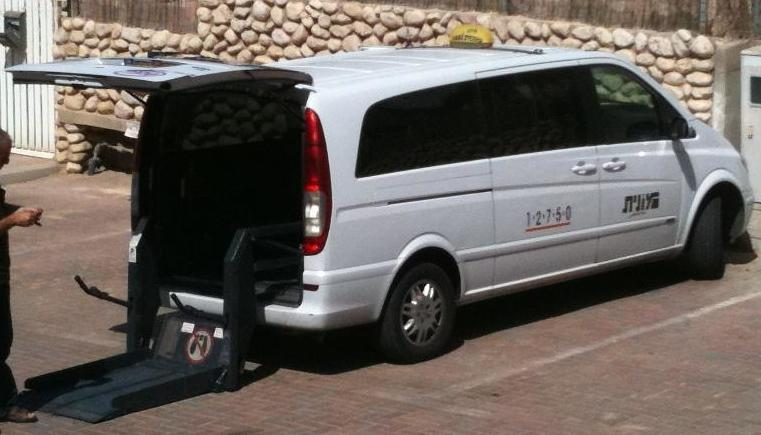
A wheelchair-adapted taxi with ramp extended in Israel

Standard vehicles are not fitted for wheelchair or mobility device access, leaving users of mobility devices with the choice of either transferring out of their mobility device, or purchasing a vehicle adapted for mobility device access via a lift or ramp, commonly referred to as a Wheelchair Accessible Vehicle (WAV). A range of vehicles can be adapted to fit a lift or a ramp, together with appropriate restraints to secure the mobility device, if necessary. Some users of mobility devices will either transfer directly from their mobility device into the vehicle, with use of a lift or they may be able to do a standing transfer. Some may be able to walk the distance between the boot (trunk) of the vehicle and the doors of the vehicle. Some may actually drive the vehicle from their wheelchair. In any case, their mobility device may still need to placed in or on the vehicle. While some users are able to lift their mobility device into the vehicle manually, stowing it either in the boot (trunk), on the front passenger seat, or behind the front seats, others may require the assistance of a hoist to lift it into the vehicle, onto the roof, or onto a trailer behind the vehicle.

== Financing (United Kingdom) ==
Generally, the more limiting the disability, the more expensive the adaptation needed for the vehicle. Financial assistance is available through some organizations, such as Motability in the United Kingdom, which requires a contribution by the prospective vehicle lessor, Motability also have a grants team who may be able to help with initial deposits and/or adaptation costs. Motability makes vehicles available for lease to disabled users in receipt of the Higher Rate Mobility Component of Disability Living Allowance (DLA) or its successor, Personal Independence Payment (PIP). If a UK-based employee with a disability requires an adapted car for work use, this would potentially be considered grounds for a "reasonable adjustment" by the employer in accordance with the Equality Act 2010. In this case the responsibility for funding the adaptation would either lie with the employer or potentially be covered by the government-operated Access to Work scheme. The Motability scheme is unique to the United Kingdom and is not replicated anywhere else in the world.

Disabled people who cannot access assisted purchase schemes must generally pay for their own vehicles to be adapted. This will add considerably to the cost of a vehicle, doubly so as adaptations generally require the purchase of a more expensive automatic model rather than one with a manual transmission, which may restrict choice to more expensive ranges, as may the need for the vehicle to have sufficient space to accommodate a wheelchair in the boot or at the driver's position. In the case of a second hand vehicle the cost of typical adaptations could well exceed the value of the vehicle. Adapting a vehicle may negatively affect the resale value, as adaptations are considered unattractive to non-disabled users, in the case of a low value vehicle sometimes rendering it worthless.

== Rental ==
A challenge for mobility-impaired drivers is renting a vehicle when they travel. Organizations that specialize in adaptive tourism can assist in finding a vehicle, when possible. In New Zealand, Enable Tourism is an organization that helps drivers with disabilities to locate car rentals offering adapted cars or vans. In France, adapted cars with hand-controls are available from leading car rental businesses, however, it is advisable for drivers with disabilities to reserve a car well in advance of travelling. Several designs of portable push-pull hand-controls are also available which may be quickly connected to a new vehicle by screwing clamps to the pedals, however these may not be suitable for drivers with more extensive requirements.

== See also ==
- Automatic transmission
- Cars for wheelchair users
- Disabled parking permit
- GO technologies
- ISO/IEC 17025
- Modified car
- Wheelchair/Platform lift
- Wheelchair accessible van
