= Bridge plate (mechanism) =

Mechanical wheelchair ramp

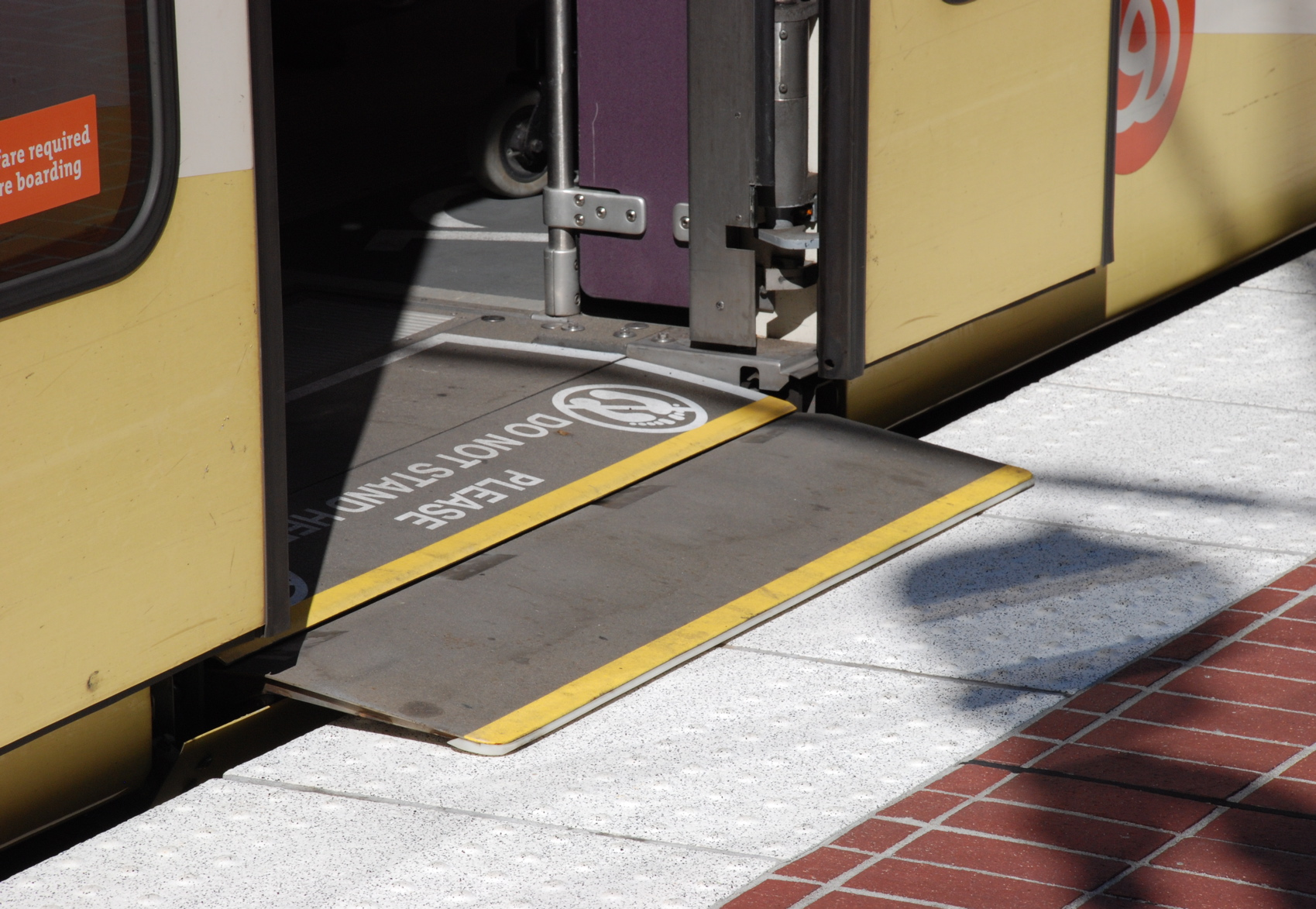
An extended bridge plate in a low-floor light rail car

A bridge plate, or bridgeplate, is a mechanical, movable form of wheelchair ramp that is used on some low-floor light rail vehicles (LRVs) to provide for wheelchair access. The bridge plate extends from the vehicle to the platform, which must be raised to close to the level of the floor of the vehicle so that the wheelchair need not travel over an excessively steep ramp (in the United States, the Americans with Disabilities Act specifies that the slope must be no more than 1 inch of rise for every 12 inches of length). Some low-floor buses also use bridge plates (in this case, extending to the curb) to provide for wheelchair access, but many low-floor buses instead use a ramp that normally serves as part of the floor but can be flipped out through the door (using a hinge at the door) onto the curb or street; in this case the ramp is long enough that it can serve as a true wheelchair ramp rather than a bridge without being excessively steep.

Bridge plates can be manually deployed (by the vehicle operator or other crew person) or powered, retractable ramps. The first passenger rail cars in North America to be equipped with retractable bridge plates were TriMet's (Portland, Oregon) Siemens SD660 LRVs, the first of which were completed in 1996. Earlier, in 1987, the newly opened SacRT light rail system used non-powered, station-platform-mounted bridge plates to bridge the gap between a high-platform section at each station and the floor of an LRV.

== Manually operated bridge plates ==
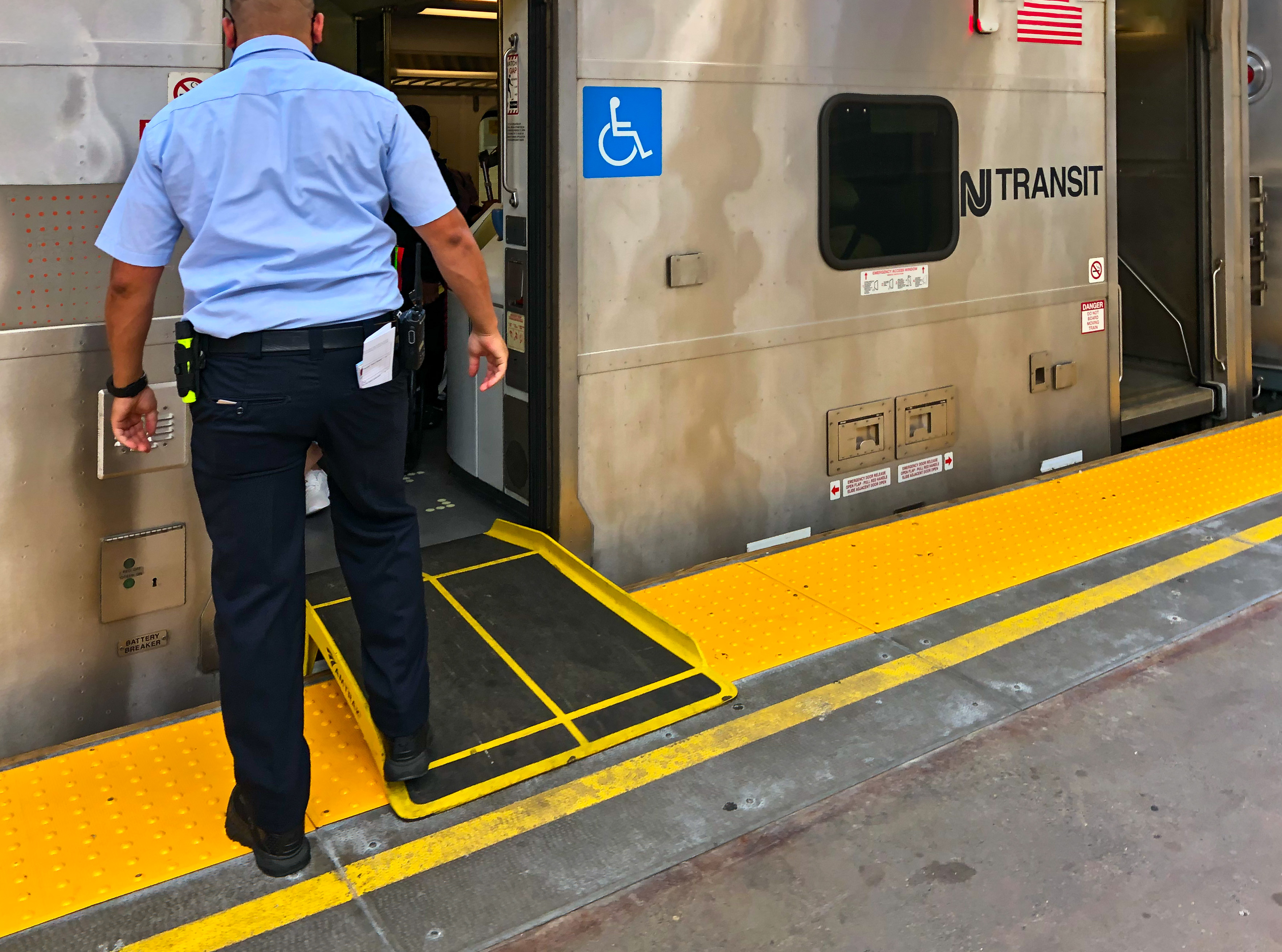
Bridge plate in use at Newark Penn Station for a wheelchair customer to exit an NJ Transit commuter train

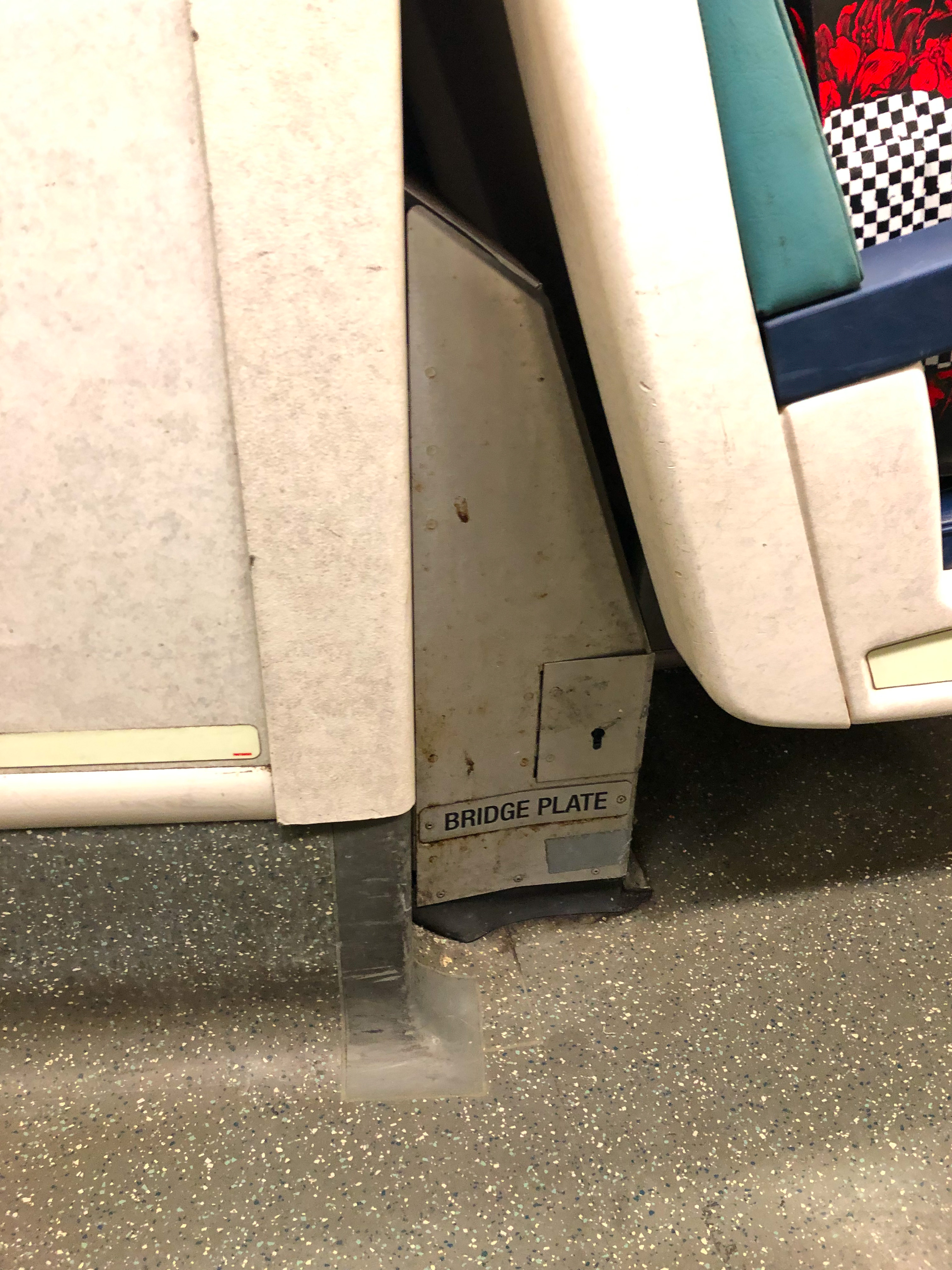
Bridge plate is stored hidden behind seats on LIRR M7 cars

On some railway stations in France and the United Kingdom, it may not be possible provide permanent level access from the platform to the train if different types of trains pass through or serve the station. To overcome this issue, a station may have one or more staff-operated boarding ramp on the platforms, to be deployed when a wheelchair user boards the train.

== Bridge plates across tracks ==
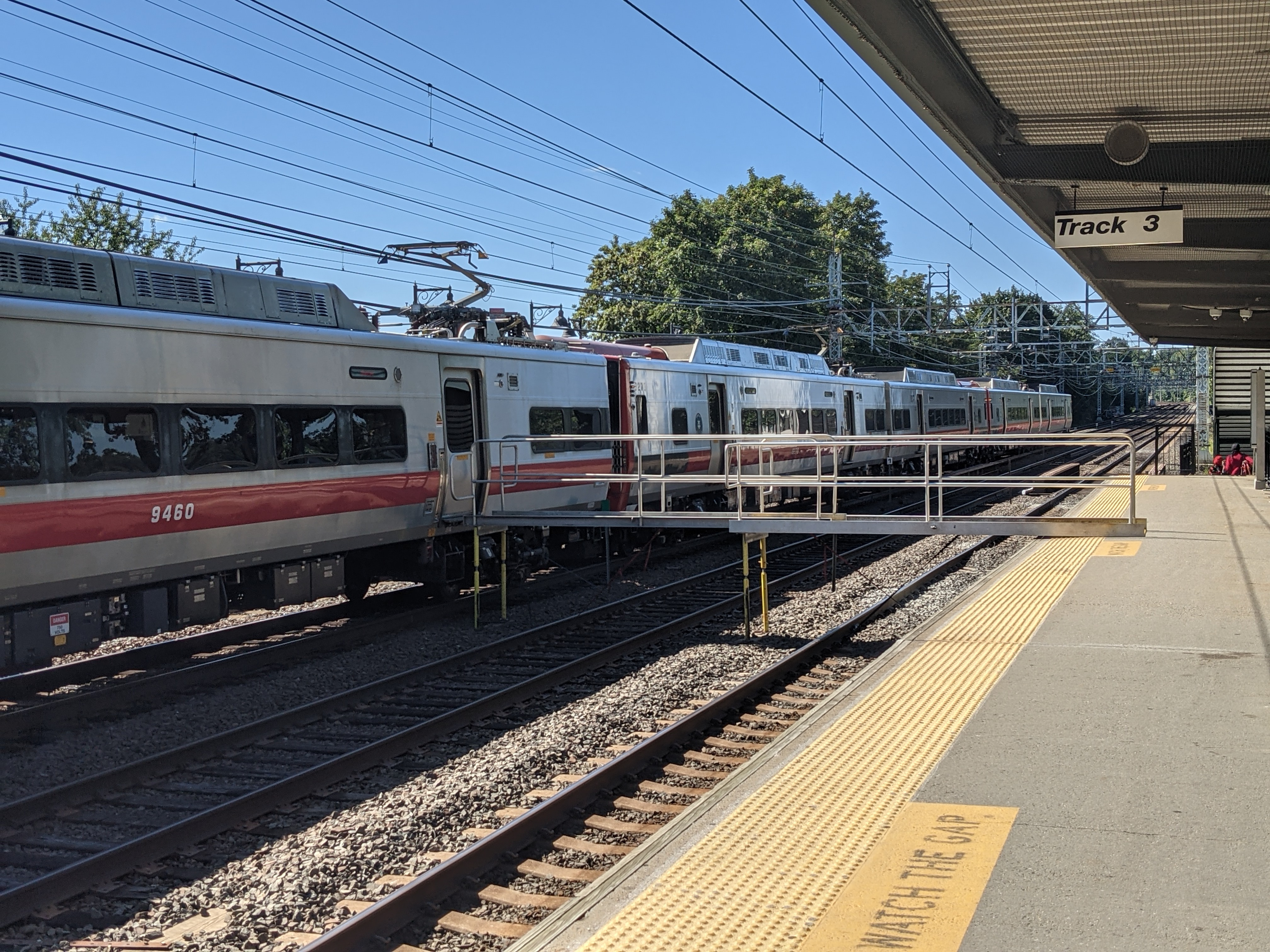
A bridge plate spanning two tracks.

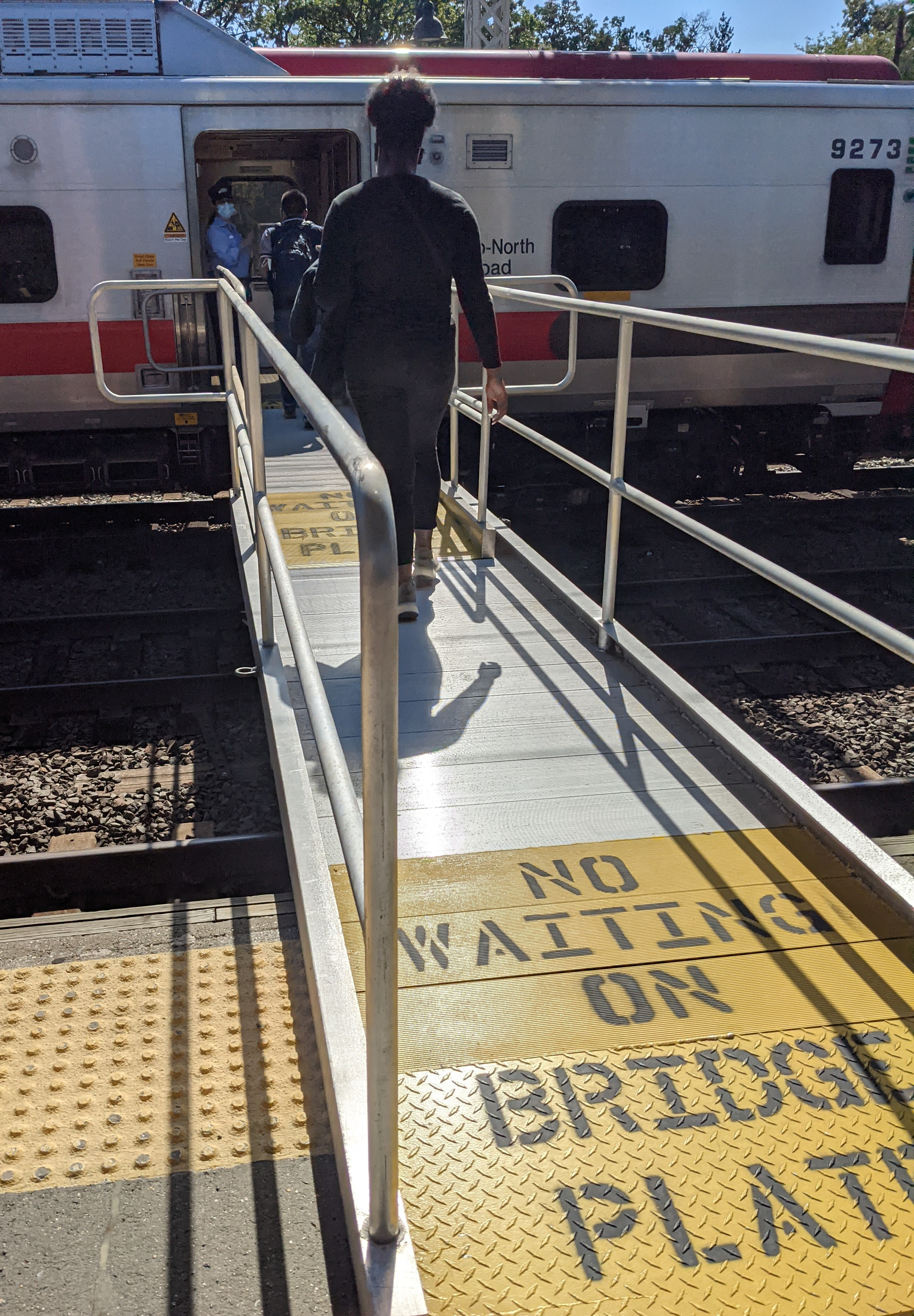
A bridge plate spanning two tracks being used for boarding.

Much larger bridge plates, spanning across tracks, are used for boarding when the track next to the platform is closed, especially for maintenance. These plates can be dangerous, as the section of track must be taken out of service and trains rerouted to avoid colliding with the plates.

== See also ==
- Platform gap filler
- Wheelchair lift
- Wheelchair ramp
