= Brodie knob =

Knob on a steering wheel rim

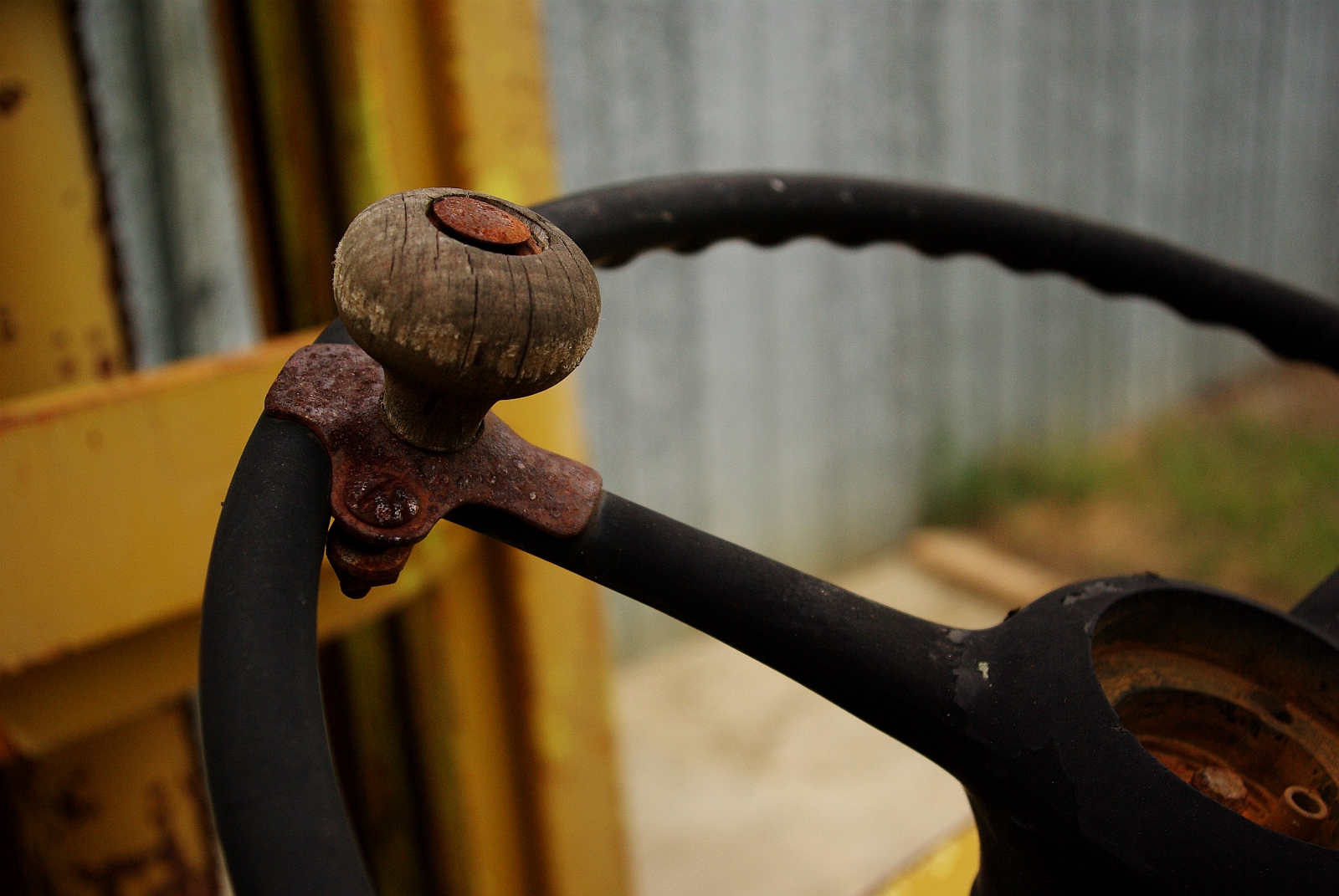
Aged Brodie knob on the steering wheel of a forklift

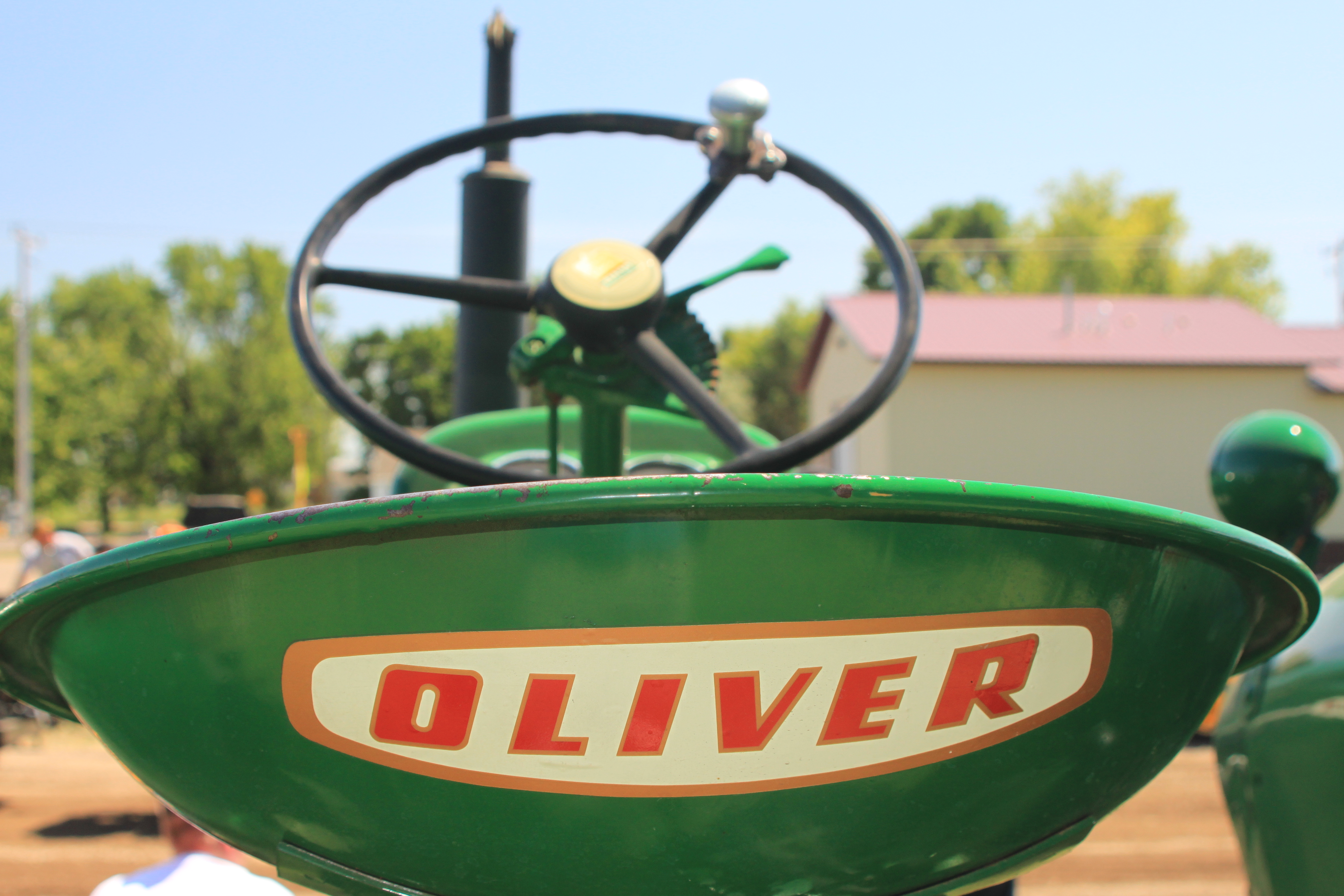
Brodie knob on an Oliver tractor

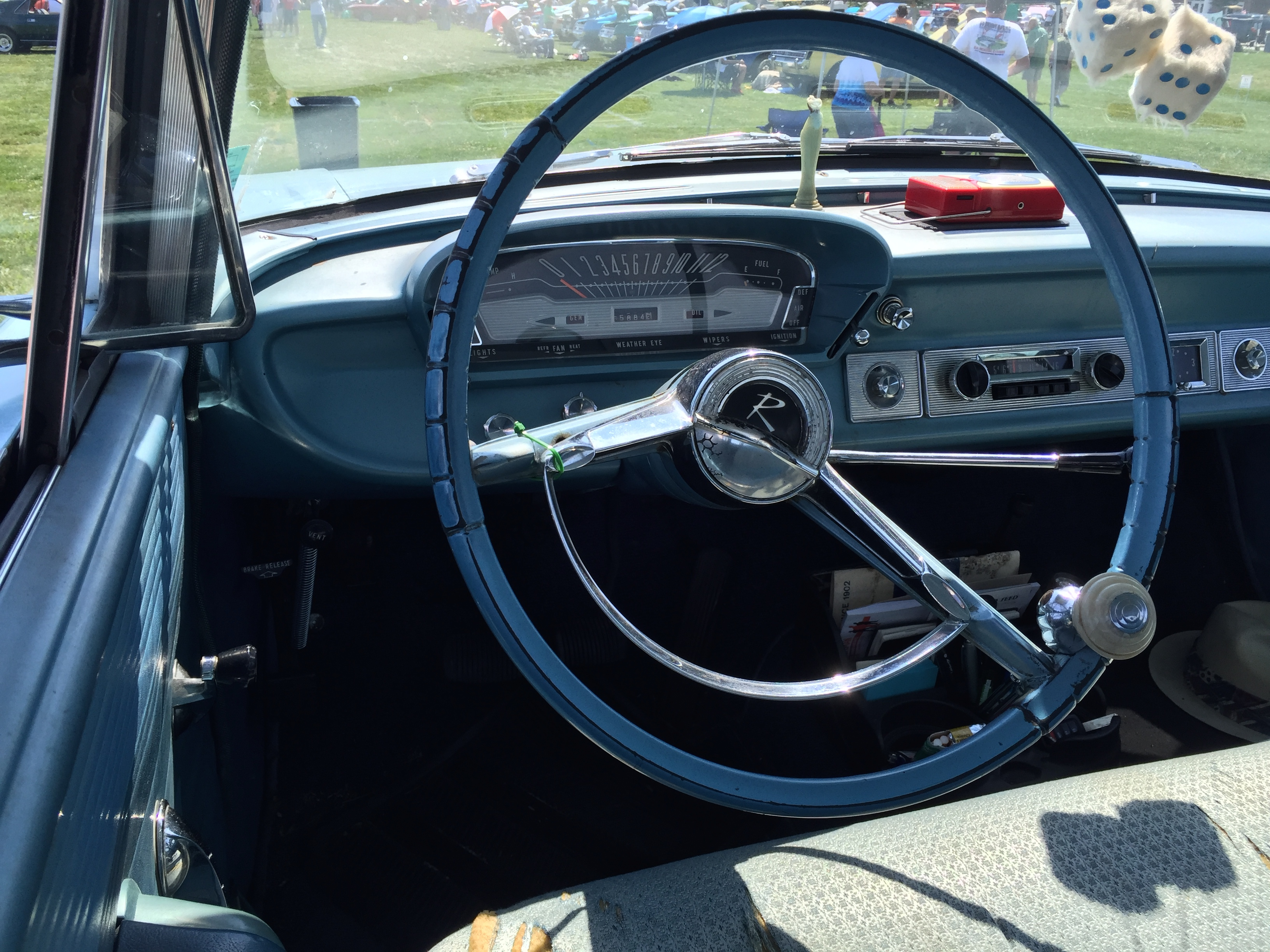
Spinner added to the steering wheel of a Rambler Classic

A brodie knob (alternative spelling: brody knob) is a doorknob-shaped handle that attaches to the steering wheel of an automobile or other vehicle or equipment with a steering wheel. Other names for this knob include suicide, necker, granny, knuckle buster, and wheel spinner.

== Design and use ==
The device is a small, independently rotating knob (similar to a U.S. classic door knob) facing the driver that is securely mounted on the outside rim of a steering wheel. The protruding knob is an aftermarket accessory. The free rotation is intended to help make steering with one hand easier or faster.

Some heavy automobiles without a power steering system tended to have heavy and slow responses requiring hand-over-hand turning of the wheel by the driver, and the knob allowed the driver to "crank" the steering wheel to make faster turns.

Brodie knobs were popular on trucks and tractors before the advent of power steering. Their primary use is still in trucks, particularly semi trucks, where they allow simultaneous steering and operation of the radio or gearshift. They are also used on forklifts, farm tractors, construction equipment, riding lawnmowers, and ice resurfacers, where frequent sharp turning is required.

The knobs are sometimes installed as an aftermarket accessory on farm and commercial tractors, their primary purpose being to ease one-handed steering. At the same time, the driver operates other controls with the other hand or is moving in reverse.

Some boats are equipped with a helm featuring a stainless-steel wheel with a brodie knob.

== Etymology and disadvantages ==
The "Steering Wheel Spinner Knob" was invented by Joel R. Thorp of Wisconsin in 1936. The name "Brodie knob" is a reference to Steve Brodie and was meant to describe all manner of reckless stunts that can be performed with the spinner knob.

The device allows the driver to turn the steering wheel quickly from fully one side to the other, making it possible to make cars "spin like a top" on snow-covered streets, but it also causes drivers to oversteer at speed because of the reduced driver's feel for the car's steering system and the road.

The device is often called a "suicide knob" because of being relatively ineffective for controlling the wheel during an emergency.

It is also called a "knuckle buster" because of the disadvantage posed by the knob when letting go of the steering wheel after going around a corner, the wheel spins rapidly, and the knob can hit the user's knuckle, forearm or elbow. If the driver is wearing a long-sleeved shirt, the protruding accessory on the steering wheel's rim can also become caught in the sleeve's open cut by the button. Attempting to free a tangled shirt sleeve from the knob may cause the driver to lose control of the car. The knobs can be dangerous if improperly installed, and in case of a collision because they can cause additional injuries to the driver upon impact.

Other names include "wheel spinner," "granny knob," and "necker's knob" because it facilitated driving by using only one arm, leaving the other arm for romantic purposes.

== Legality ==
Some U.S. states have laws that regulate or prohibit the use of brodie knobs. Some states allow the use of an accessory knob on the steering wheel for drivers who need them to operate a vehicle because of a disability.

The U.S. Occupational Safety and Health Administration (OSHA) regulations restrict the use of auxiliary devices for specific construction vehicles. Moreover, OSHA prohibits modification of industrial equipment without the approval of the equipment manufacturer.

In the Netherlands, brodie knobs are only allowed if the driver has a valid medical reason for it. In forklifts and other equipment requiring frequent sharp steering, they are permitted regardless of medical reason.

The regulations in the UK do not allow any protrusions of the steering wheel, except for those with disabilities who need modifications for their cars.
