= Amigo Mobility =

American manufacturer of mobility vehicles

Amigo Mobility International, Inc.
- Company type: Private
- Industry: Electric mobility devices
- Founded: 1968
- Founders: Al Thieme
- Headquarters: Bridgeport Township, Michigan
- Key people: Al Thieme (Chairman); Beth Thieme (President and CEO)
- Products: Aircraft tugs; Material handling equipment; Mobility scooters; Motorized shopping carts
- Website: Official website

Amigo Mobility International, Inc. is an American manufacturer that produces electric mobility devices for use in aviation, healthcare, logistics, and retail.

== History ==
Amigo Mobility was founded by Allan "Al" R. Thieme in 1968 to manufacture and sell the electric mobility scooter he had developed. At the time, Thieme was working as a plumbing and heating contractor in Bridgeport, Michigan.

Thieme developed the company's first mobility scooter in 1968 to assist a family member who had begun losing their mobility due to multiple sclerosis. He named the device Amigo in reference to a Portuguese and Spanish word for friend.

Originally not considered eligible for healthcare insurance coverage as a personal mobility device usable for healthcare purposes (similar to a wheelchair), the company had to seek an amendment to existing laws by the United States Congress to quality the mobility scooter for federal reimbursement. By the mid-1980s, the United States federal government was reimbursing nearly a portion of the cost of nearly half of the mobility scooters sold - primarily through Medicare, Medicaid, and the Veterans Health Administration. The passage of the Americans with Disabilities Act of 1990 increased the usability and popularity of the devices in the United States.

In 1970, the company introduced their first motorized shopping cart, a variation on their mobility scooter with a built-in basket.

The company began selling their mobility scooters in the United Kingdom in 1978 through Raymar, an independent and recently formed company based in the UK.

Thieme received the National Small Business Person of the Year award in 1981 from the United States Small Business Administration. His wife, Beth Thieme, joined him in receiving the Michigan Manufacturer of the Year award from the Michigan Manufacturer's Association in 2012.

Amigo Mobility began providing electric mobility devices for logistical support by introducing their first electric material-handling cart in 2015.

In 2020, the company began construction on an expansion to their headquarters and manufacturing facility in Bridgeport Township, Michigan. The expansion was completed a year later in 2021.

Amigo Mobility acquired the company AeroTow in 2021 and expanded into providing electric mobility devices for the aviation industry.

== Products ==
=== Aircraft tugs ===
==== AeroTow ====
In 2021, Amigo Mobility acquired AeroTow in 2021 and expanded into manufacturing and selling aircraft tugs - used during an aircraft's pushback procedure.

AeroTow, also known as Aero-Tow, was founded in 1996 by Terry Railing. Railing was an original owner of Chapter 2, a machine shop that produced the Gettelman Lug-Bug. He also owned and operated a True Value Hardware store prior to starting AeroTow.

The company's AeroTow produces and sells electrical and manually powered tugs for a variety of small aircraft.

=== Material handling equipment ===
Amigo Mobility introduced their first electric material handling cart in 2015. They produce a variety of platform trucks with different tow capacities.

=== Personal mobility devices ===
==== Amigo scooters ====
Amigo Mobility's founder, Al Thieme, developed their first personal mobility device - the Amigo scooter - in his garage in 1968 to assist a family member who had begun losing their mobility due to multiple sclerosis. He named the device Amigo, the friendly wheelchair, in reference to amigo, a Portuguese and Spanish word for friend. The first device operated at up to 4 miles per hour (6.4 km/h).

In 1970, the company introduced a motorized shopping cart. The design remained in use until it was modernized in 2002.

Amigo introduced a personal mobility device designed for use on more rugged terrain in 1987.

==== Amigo TravelMate ====
They introduced the Amigo TravelMate in 1998, marketed as the world's first folding personal mobility device.

== See also ==
- Mobility scooter
- Motorized shopping cart
