= Motorized wheelchair =

Wheelchair propelled by electric motor

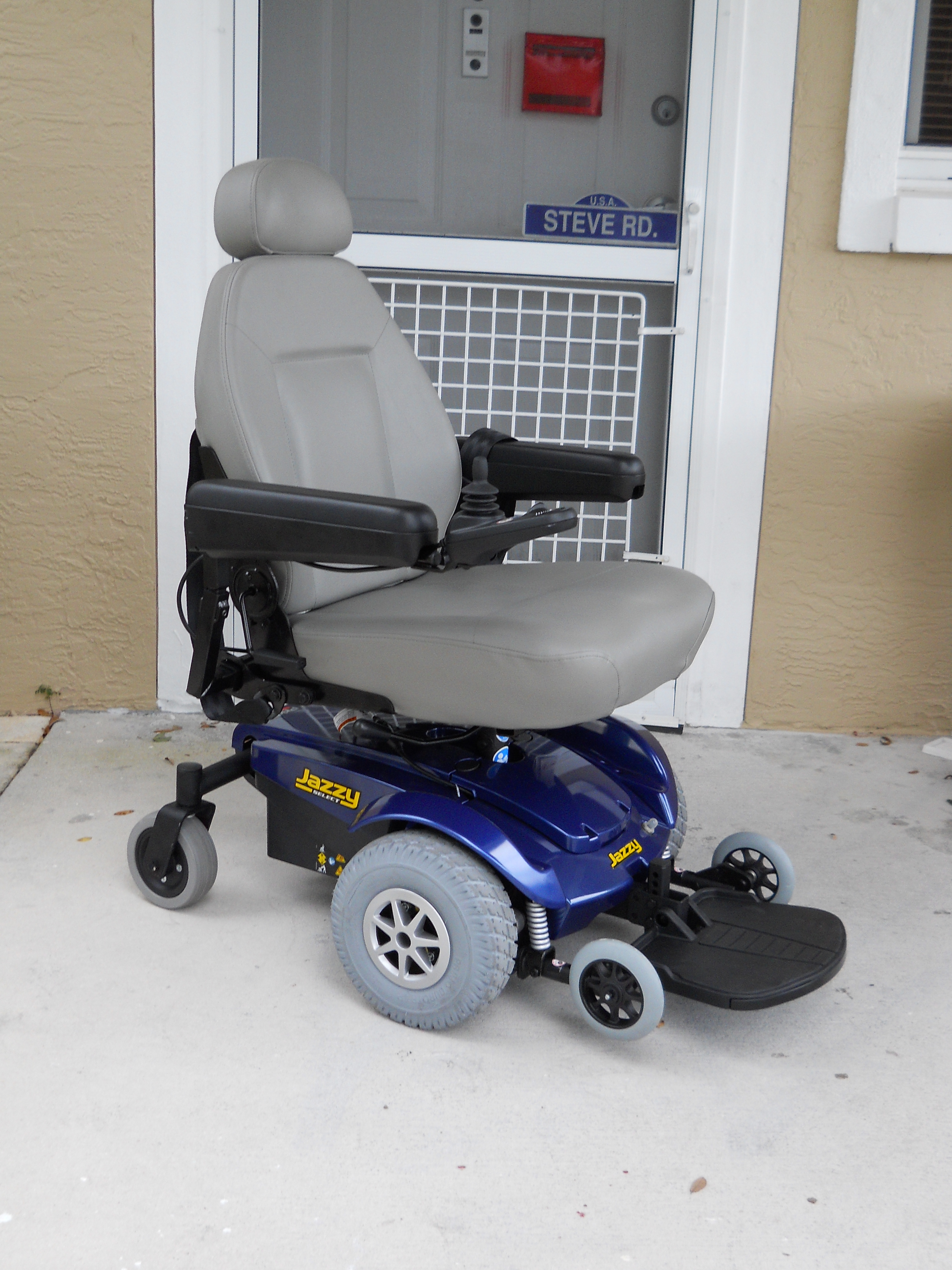
A front-wheel-drive chair with a "captain's chair" seat

A motorized wheelchair, also known as a powerchair, electric wheelchair, electronic wheelchair, electric-powered wheelchair, and electronic-powered wheelchair, is a wheelchair that is propelled by means of an electric motor (usually using differential steering) rather than manual power. Motorized wheelchairs are useful for those unable to propel a manual wheelchair or who need to use a wheelchair over long distances or on terrain that would otherwise be fatiguing in a manual wheelchair. They may also be used not just by people with 'traditional' mobility impairments, but also by people with cardiovascular and fatigue-based conditions.

== History ==
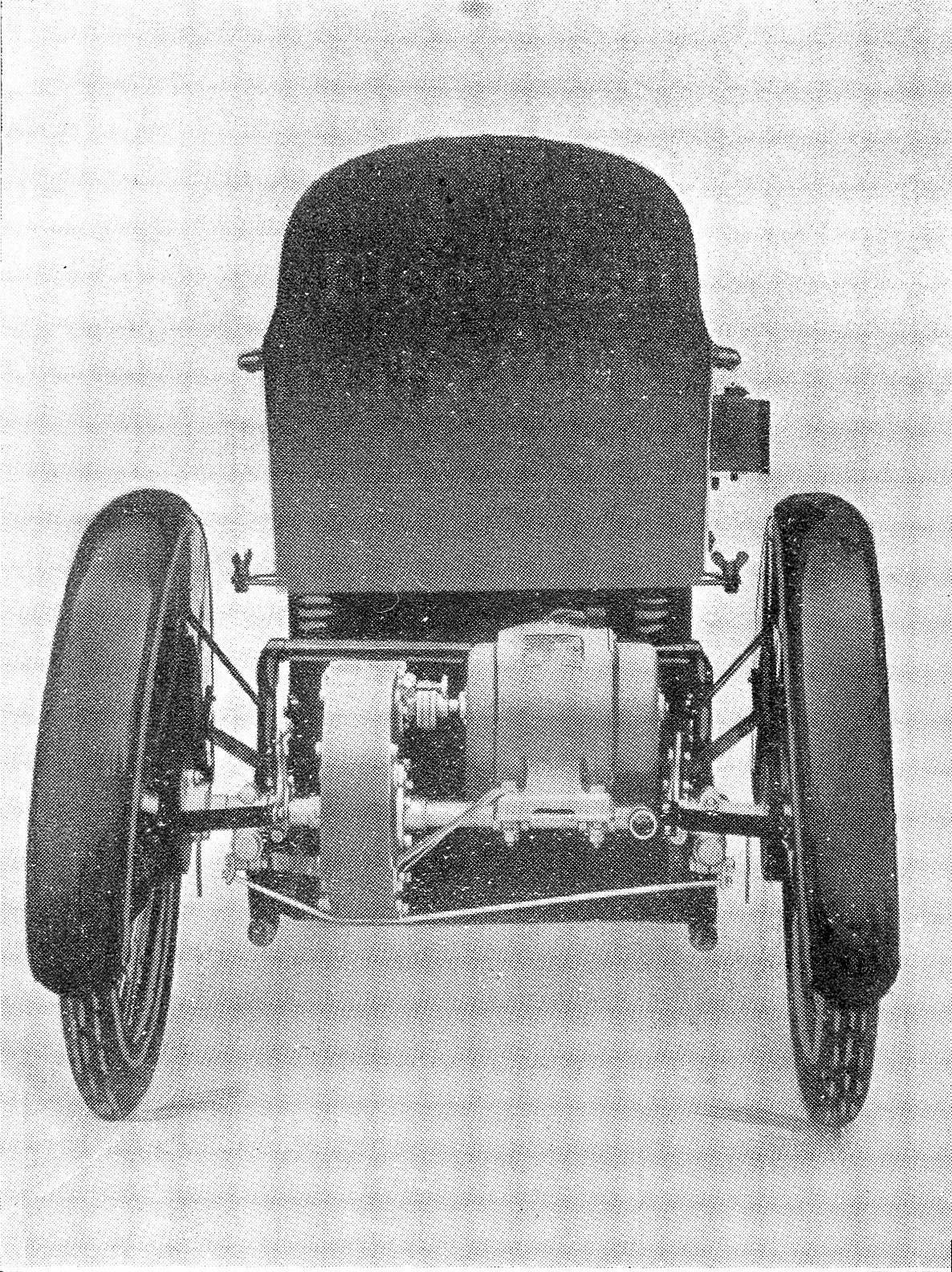
Harding electrically propelled invalid chair (1930s)

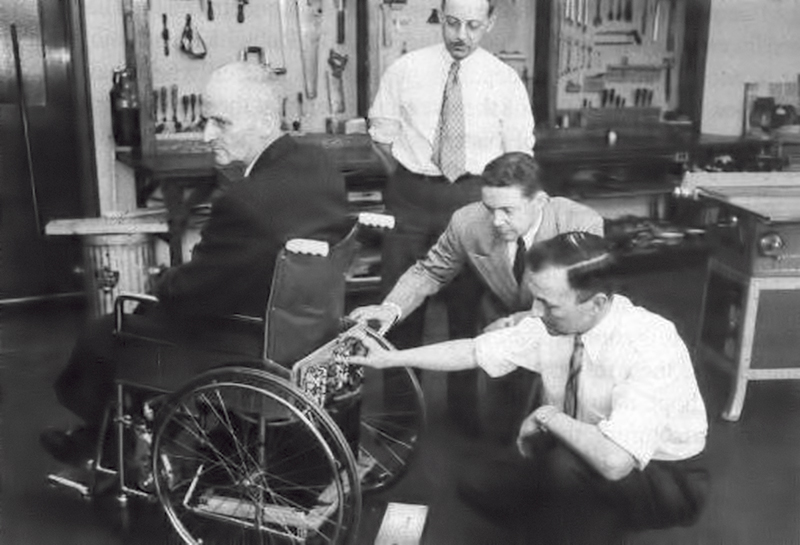
George Klein and others with his Klein Drive Chair, 1953

An early motorized wheelchair was invented by Levitt Luzern Custer in 1919 at Dayton Soldiers' Home in Dayton, Ohio to help wounded World War 1 veterans. An electrically propelled tricycle was developed by the R.A. Harding company in England in the 1920s. The first electric-powered wheelchair to be put into production was invented by George Klein, who worked for the National Research Council of Canada, to assist injured veterans after World War II.

== Design ==
Powerchair design may be categorized by drive system/chassis, battery, controller, seat, and use. Because of their use as the primary method of locomotion, they must be of the utmost reliability both electrically and structurally, and are classified as Durable medical equipment by Medicare in the United States.

=== Drive System/Chassis ===
Powerchairs are generally four-wheeled or six-wheeled and non-folding, however some folding designs exist and other designs may have some ability to partially dismantle for transit.

Four general powerchair drive systems exist: front-wheel drive, centre-wheel drive, rear-wheel drive, and all-wheel drive. Powered wheels are typically somewhat larger than the trailing/castoring wheels, while castoring wheels are typically larger than the castors on a manual chair. Centre wheel drive powerchairs have castors at both front and rear for a six-wheel layout.

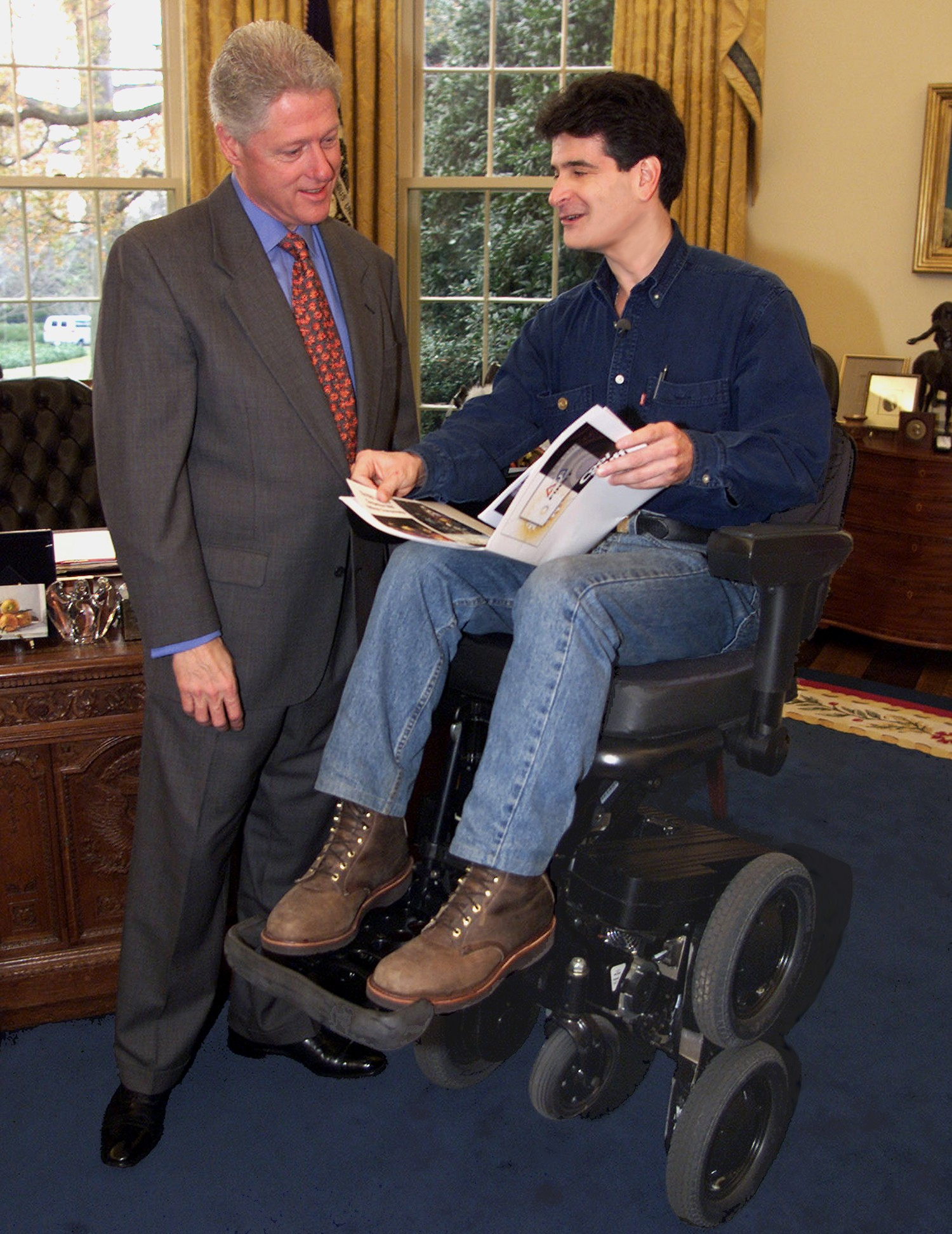
Former US President Bill Clinton, Dean Kamen and the iBot

Powerchair chassis may also mount a kerb-climber, a powered device to lift the front wheels over a kerb of 10 cm or less.

Some manual wheelchairs may also be fitted with an auxiliary electric power system. This can take one of three forms: integrated with the hub of hand-propelled wheels, so that any force on the pushrims is magnified by the drive system, or mounted under the wheelchair and controlled as for a powerchair, but with the motive force either transmitted to the main wheels via a friction drive system, or delivered directly through an auxiliary drive wheel.

Some experimental all-terrain powerchair designs have been produced with tracks rather than wheels, but these are not in common use.

Other experimental designs have incorporated stair-climbing capabilities; Dean Kamen's iBOT design, introduced in 1999 and discontinued in 2009, featured both this capability and the ability to 'stand' on its upended chassis using advanced gyroscopic sensors.

Some modern power wheelchairs incorporate omnidirectional front wheels, each consisting of multiple small rubber tires that can rotate independently. One example is the WHILL, which uses two such front wheels combined with a four-wheel-drive system and motor controller. This design allows movement in any direction with a tight turning radius suitable for both indoor and outdoor use.

=== Battery ===
The electric motors of powerchairs are usually powered by 2 batteries that are connected to the 2 motors, the smaller batteries are used in pairs to give the chair enough power to last at least one day between charges. These are available in wet or dry options. As wet-cell batteries may not legally be carried on an aircraft without removing them from the wheelchair and securing them in a shipping container, dry-cell batteries are preferred for powerchair use. Many powerchairs carry an on-board charger which can be plugged into a standard wall outlet; older or more portable models may have a separate charger unit.

=== Controller ===
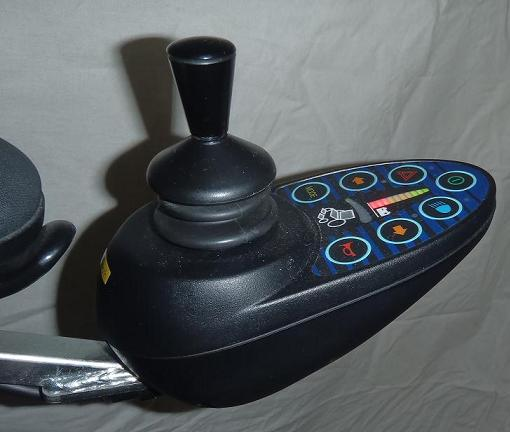
A typical joystick controller

Controllers are most commonly an arm-rest mounted joystick which may have additional controls to allow the user to tailor sensitivity or access multiple control modes. The controller may be swung-away to aid in side-transfers. For users who are unable to use a hand controller various alternatives are available such as sip-and-puff controllers, operated by blowing into a sensor. In some cases the controller may be mounted for use by an aide walking behind the chair rather than by the user. Capabilities include turning one drive wheel forward while the other goes backward, thus turning the wheelchair within its own length (differential steering).

Mind-controlled wheelchairs, actually working by the detection of brainwaves or nerve signals via sensors on the scalp or elsewhere, have been demonstrated in laboratory environments.

=== Seat ===
The seating on a powerchair can vary in design. Seating ranges from a basic sling seat and backrest made of vinyl or nylon, some chairs have an optional padding, some have more comfortable cushion and backrest options which may include a head rest. There are companies that can fit their own backrests and seat cushions for people with increased need for stability in the trunk, or at increased risk of pressure sores from sitting out. Finally, specialist seating solutions are available for users who need individually tailored support. Leg rests may be integrated into the seating design and may have powered adjustment for those users who need to vary their leg position. Powerchairs may also have a tilt-in-space, or reclining facility for users who are unable to maintain an upright seating position indefinitely. This function can also help with comfort by shifting pressure to different areas for a while, or with positioning in a wheelchair when a user needs to be hoisted in.

Certain high-end powerchairs feature a 'standing' capability in which either the entire seat elevates to bring the user to standing height or the seat-base, seat-back and leg rests move in conjunction to bring the user into an upright position. The powerchair may or may not be able to move while in the elevated position.

=== Environment ===
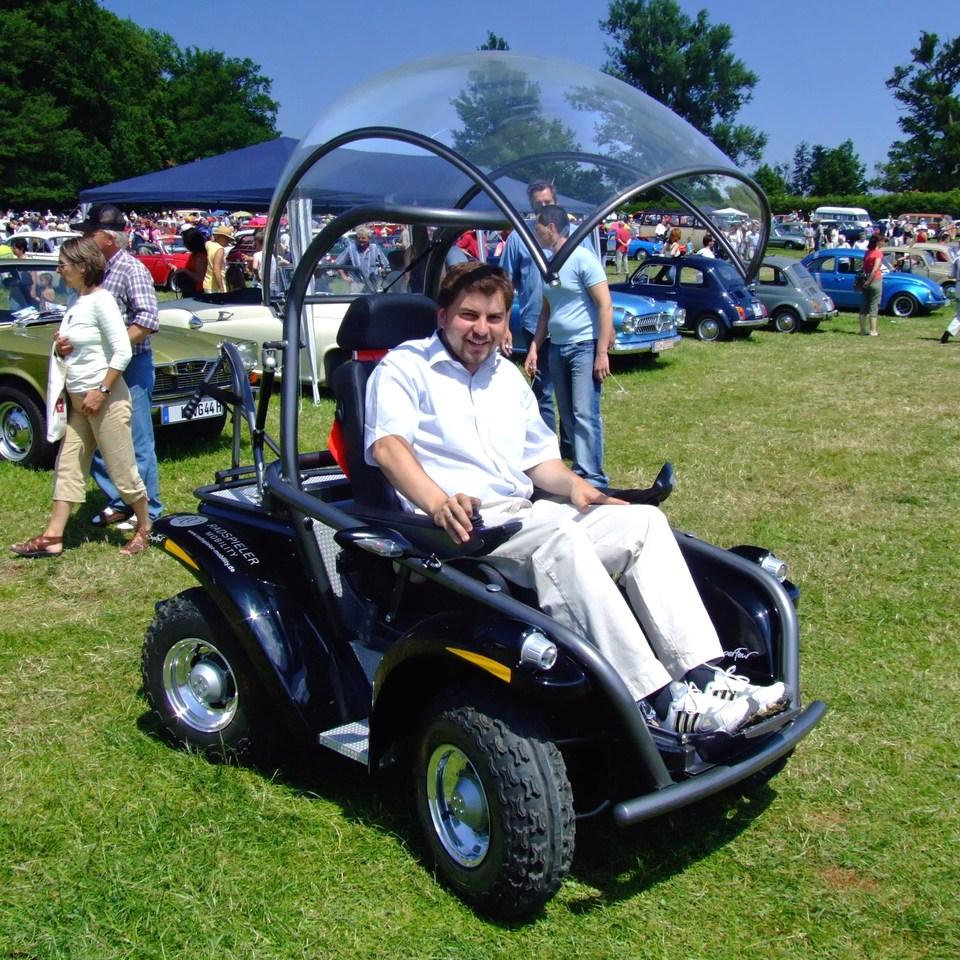
A large ATV-style outdoor chair

Powerchairs may be designed for indoor, outdoor or indoor/outdoor use. A typical indoor powerchair will be narrow and short, to enable better maneuver around tight environments. Controls are usually simple, and due to the smaller design, the chair would be less stable outdoors. Tires are often smoother (once called carpet tires) to protect the flooring in a home. Indoor/outdoor powerchairs again will be as small in design as possible, but with a reasonable range in the batteries, some grippy tires (but not big wobbly off-road tires), these often include a curb-climber to assist with manoeuvres where there are no drop curbs. Intended for pavement use only. Outdoor powerchairs have a considerable range, a large wheelbase to help with stability, and large tires which improve the comfort and handling of the chair. These can sometimes be driven indoors in adapted environments, but not around a typical home.

Some very large outdoor powerchairs have been designed with cross-country mobility in mind and show design convergence with other types of cross-country vehicle.

=== Transportation ===
Most wheelchairs are crash tested to standards 7176, and ISO 10542. These standards mean that a wheelchair can be used facing forward in a vehicle if the vehicle has been fitted with an approved tiedown or docking system for securing the wheelchair, and a method of securing the occupant of the wheelchair.

== Use ==
Powerchairs are generally prescribed for use by users who are unable to use a manual wheelchair. However, in both the US (Medicare and some private insurers) and the UK (National Health Service) powerchairs are generally not prescribed to users who have any ability to walk within the home, even if that ability is variable or so functionally constrained as to be practically useless under most conditions. For example, someone might be able to walk around the kitchen or office, but is not able to walk as far as the bus stop - or even less far whilst carrying shopping. Neither is consideration given as to whether the user is able to move a manual wheelchair themselves. For example, a wheelchair user who is not strong enough to wheel themselves to a bus stop is still not eligible for a power wheelchair. Disability rights activists are campaigning for prescription procedures to focus on an individual needs-based assessment rather than on inflexible application of prescription rules. The restricted prescribing leads to many users being forced to procure a solution privately, in some cases settling for a powerchair or a mobility scooter that is less than ideal to their needs but which falls within their budget.

The use of powerchairs is not restricted solely to users unable to use manual chairs. Any disabled person with a mobility, fatigue or pain-based impairment or cardio-vascular issues may find a powerchair advantageous in some circumstances; however, existing prescription practices generally mean that powerchairs for such use must be privately procured or hired for the occasion.

=== Sports ===
Sports such as Powerchair Football and Power hockey have been designed specifically for power wheelchair users along with purpose built power wheelchairs.

== Limitations ==
Access adaptations such as wheelchair spaces on public transport and wheelchair lifts are frequently designed around a typical manual wheelchair (in the UK referred to as a 'reference wheelchair'). Powerchairs, however, frequently exceed the size and weight limits of manual wheelchairs as they are not constrained by the ability of the user to self-propel. Some designs are too large or heavy for certain wheelchair spaces and lifts. However, there are new designs and innovations seeking to overcome these issues.

Power wheelchairs are produced by several major manufacturers. A 2014 study of 945 users with spinal cord injury found that the most commonly prescribed models came from Invacare, Permobil, Pride, Sunrise Mobility and Everest & Jennings. Repair rates were high across all manufacturers (54.5% to 73.9% of users required at least one repair in a 6-month period), with statistically significant differences between brands for certain wheelchair groups.

== See also ==
- Mobility scooter
- Motorized shopping cart
- Rehabilitation engineering
- Standing wheelchair
- Wheelchair ramp
