= Motorized shopping cart =

Shopping cart equipped with an electric motor and navigational controls

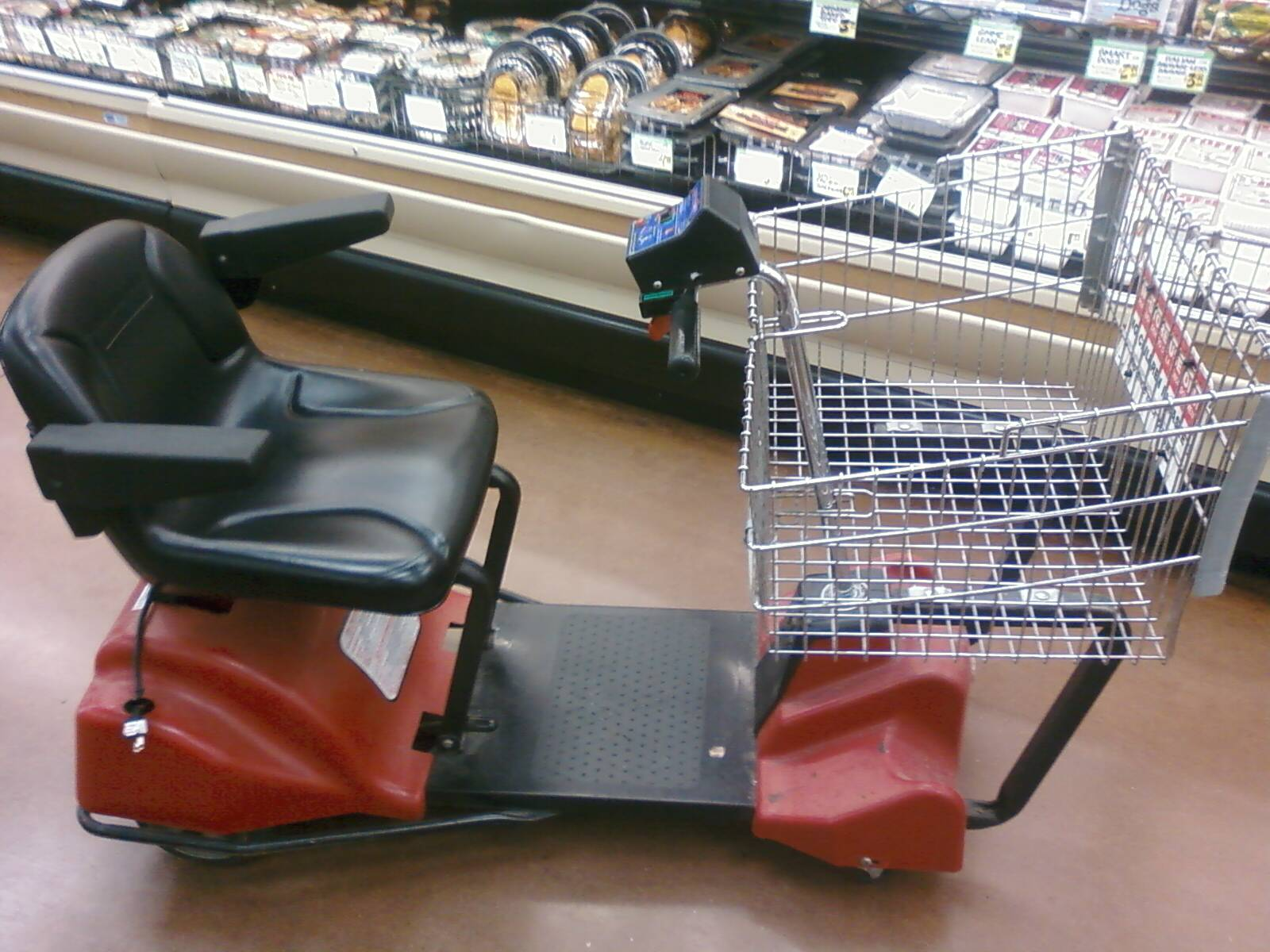
A motorized shopping cart in a supermarket

A motorized shopping cart (also known as electric shopping cart) is a shopping cart equipped with an electric motor and navigational controls. It includes a seat (often equipped with an occupant seat switch activating movement of the motorized shopping cart from the occupant's weight) thereby also making it a motorized wheelchair, and it has a rechargeable battery that can be charged by plugging in the device when not in use in order to maximize usage. Motorized shopping carts are provided by supermarkets and other large retail stores for those with permanent or temporary physical disabilities who may have difficulty walking through a large store or pushing a regular cart.

== Issues ==
=== Theft ===
While shopping cart theft has also been a costly matter for retailers, the higher cost of the motorized carts makes their theft a greater issue to the store, and thereby leads stores to establish policies prohibiting the carts from exiting stores, even though a disabled person may have the need to bring the cart all the way to their vehicle.

In May 2009, a Florida man was charged with felony theft of a motorized cart due to its $2,500 value. He was caught not far from the store, riding the cart. Had a non-electric cart been stolen, the theft would have been a misdemeanor.

In the same month, two South Carolina men were charged with the theft of a cart, and likewise faced felony charges due to it being valued at over $2,000.

Such thefts are rare and difficult to sustain as the carts are obviously grocery store carts, which are designed with a maximum speed of two miles per hour. Most power-operated mobility devices, such as powerchairs and scooters, have an average maximum speed of 5 miles per hour, though many are faster. The baskets and seats are of commercial strength and the wheels are much smaller than those of consumer mobility devices.

=== Injuries ===
There has been concern over the carts leading to injuries when used by those who do not know how to control them well. The injuries can occur to the user if they crash into an object with the cart, or to a person the user crashes into. To reduce the risk of injury, most carts have a back-up warning system similar to those found on trucks. They also are programmed with a low maximum speed of up to two miles per hour.

In Louisiana in 2011, a lawsuit was filed by a woman who claimed injury while using a motorized shopping cart. The case was dismissed as the defendant filed a motion asserting that the accident and injuries were caused by the woman's own actions and she could not meet the burden of proof. The store manager immediately tested the cart after the claimed injury and further testing was done by the store mechanic and an engineer.

=== Permission to use ===
While motorized shopping carts are generally reserved for disabled people, most stores will take one's word for being disabled and will not challenge one's need for a cart. However, there have been cases reported in which a person with a non-visible disability has requested the use of a motorized cart, but has been denied the use by store employees who did not believe the customer had a disability.

There has also been concern over minors using the carts. In January 2009, a Wal-Mart store in Tennessee did not allow an 11-year-old girl with a broken leg to use a motorized cart, despite the fact that she had been allowed by other stores to use them.

== See also ==
- All-terrain wheelchair
- Hobcart
- Wheelchair
- Mobility scooter
