= Wheelchair lift =

Powered device to raise a wheelchair and its occupant over a vertical barrier

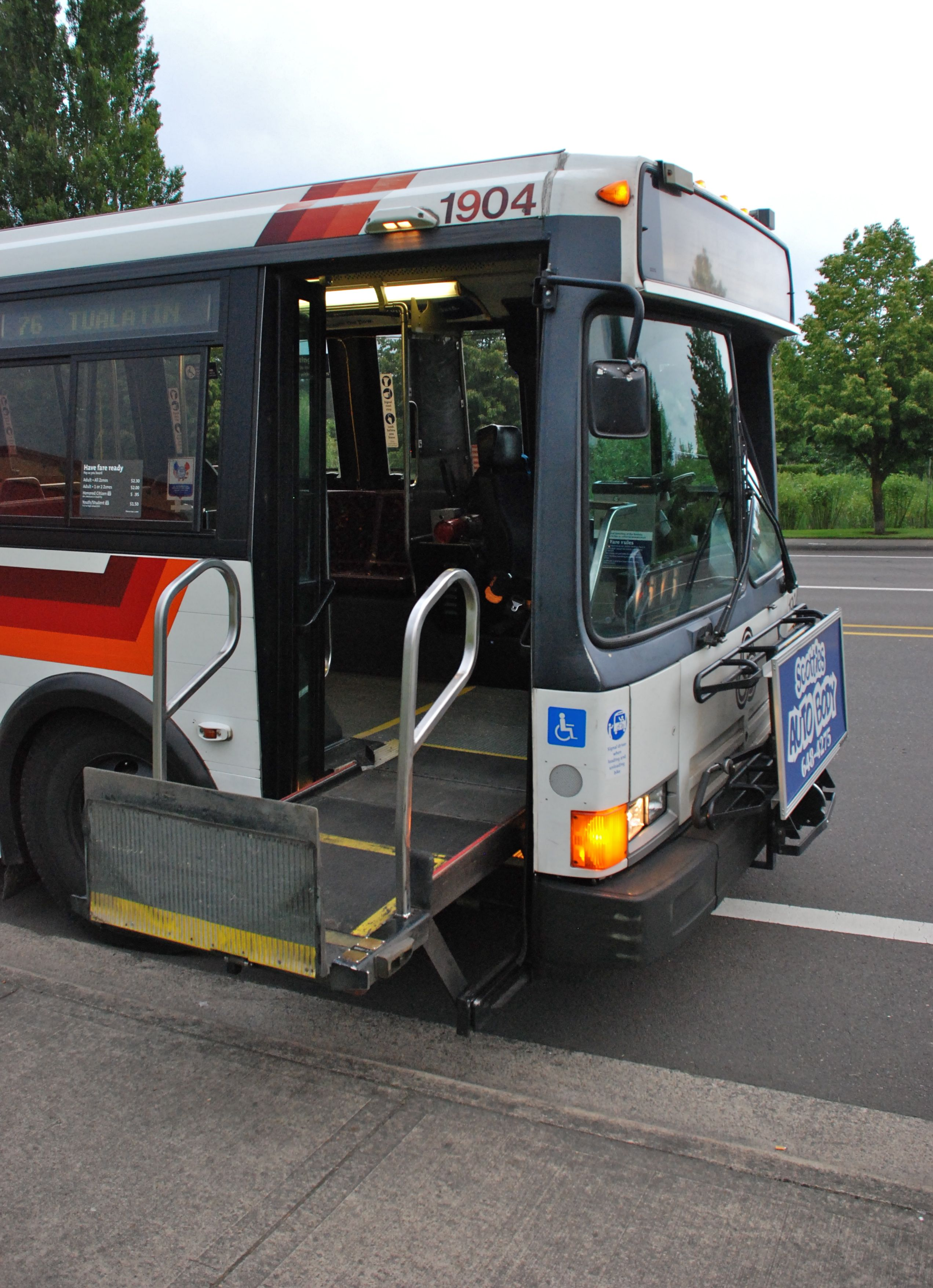
A wheelchair lift in the front door of a TriMet bus in Portland, Oregon, in 2010

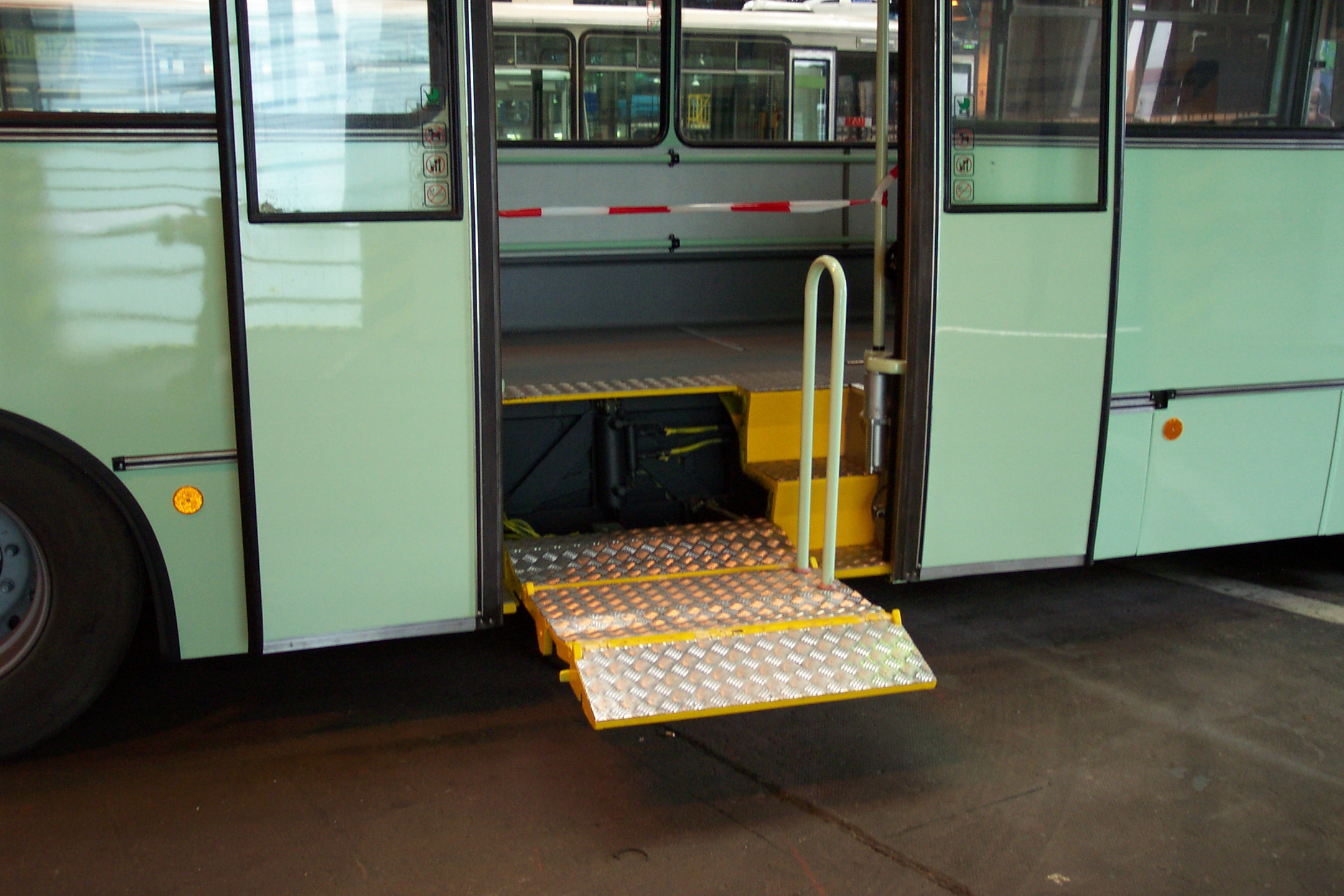
A bus in Prague with wheelchair lift extended, 2006

A wheelchair lift, also known as a platform lift, or vertical platform lift, is a fully powered device designed to raise a wheelchair and its occupant in order to overcome a step or similar vertical barrier.

Wheelchair lifts can be installed in homes or businesses and are often added to both private and public vehicles in order to meet accessibility requirements laid out by disability acts. These mobility devices are often installed in homes as an alternative to a stair lift, which only transport a passenger and not his/her wheelchair or mobility scooter.

== Regulations ==
In the United States, the Americans with Disabilities Act of 1990 (ADA) required that all new mass transit vehicles placed into service after July 1, 1993, be accessible to persons in wheelchairs, and until the 2000s, this requirement was most commonly met by the inclusion of a wheelchair lift. In 1993, there were 29,033 transit buses in the U.S. equipped with wheelchair lifts or ramps, representing 52 percent of all U.S. transit buses. By 2001, this figure had grown to 58,785 buses (although the percentage that were equipped with lifts, as opposed to ramps, is unknown).

A number of legal regimes in various countries regulate the use of wheelchair lifts, setting forth standards for the devices and requiring certain kinds of businesses to make parking lots accessible to vehicles bearing the devices. In some instances, accessibility standards have been achieved in legal settlements. For example, in the 2005 case of Dilworth, et al. v. City of Detroit, NO. 2:04- cv-73152 (E.D. Mich. 2005), the defendant city conceded that the ADA and its supporting legislation required the city "to maintain the wheelchair lifts on its buses in operative condition; promptly repair wheelchair lifts if they are damaged or out of order; establish a system of regular and frequent maintenance checks of wheelchair lifts; remove a vehicle from service if the lift is inoperative (with limited exceptions); provide alternative transportation when the lift doesn't work and the next accessible bus is more than 30 minutes away."

As mandated by the National Highway Traffic Safety Administration (NHTSA), wheelchair-accessible vans with wheelchair lifts are equipped with a safety lift interlock. Designed to prevent operation of the wheelchair van or wheelchair lift in unsafe situations, the safety interlock will sound an alarm if an unsafe condition exists (e.g., the vehicle attempts to move while the lift is deployed) or prevent the vehicle from shifting into drive while the wheelchair lift is in operation.

In Europe, vertical lifting platforms for people with impaired mobility are covered by EN 81-41. Its 2024 edition, published on 27 November 2024, applies to electrically powered platforms fixed to a building structure, travelling between predefined levels at no more than 15 degrees from the vertical, carrying people standing, seated or in a wheelchair, and limited to a rated speed of 0.15 m/s.

== Ramps ==
In 2002, innovations allowed the development of wheelchair lifts that assist people in entering truck cabs, so that they may drive or operate heavy equipment. Wheelchair lifts can also be used to move an unoccupied scooter into a vehicle.

Low-floor transit vehicles (buses, streetcars, light rail cars) – fitted with ramps or bridge plates rather than lifts – later began to become more common than lifts for heavy-duty transit vehicles, while lifts continue to be used in paratransit vehicles.

While some wheelchair-accessible vans use a powered lift to assist the occupant in boarding, a wheelchair ramp is usually less expensive for this purpose and is often installed on minivans. Full-size vans require the use of a platform lift. There are two types of platform lifts installed on wheelchair-accessible vans: single-arm and dual-arm. Single-arm wheelchair lifts are only used in side-entry applications. They take up less interior space and leave the passenger entry open; however, they have less lifting capacity than dual-arm lifts. Most dual-arm wheelchair lifts have a lift capacity up to 800 pounds. These lifts consume more interior space and block the side entry and, for these reasons, are often mounted in the back of the vehicle for rear-entry applications.

== Residential and commercial lifts ==
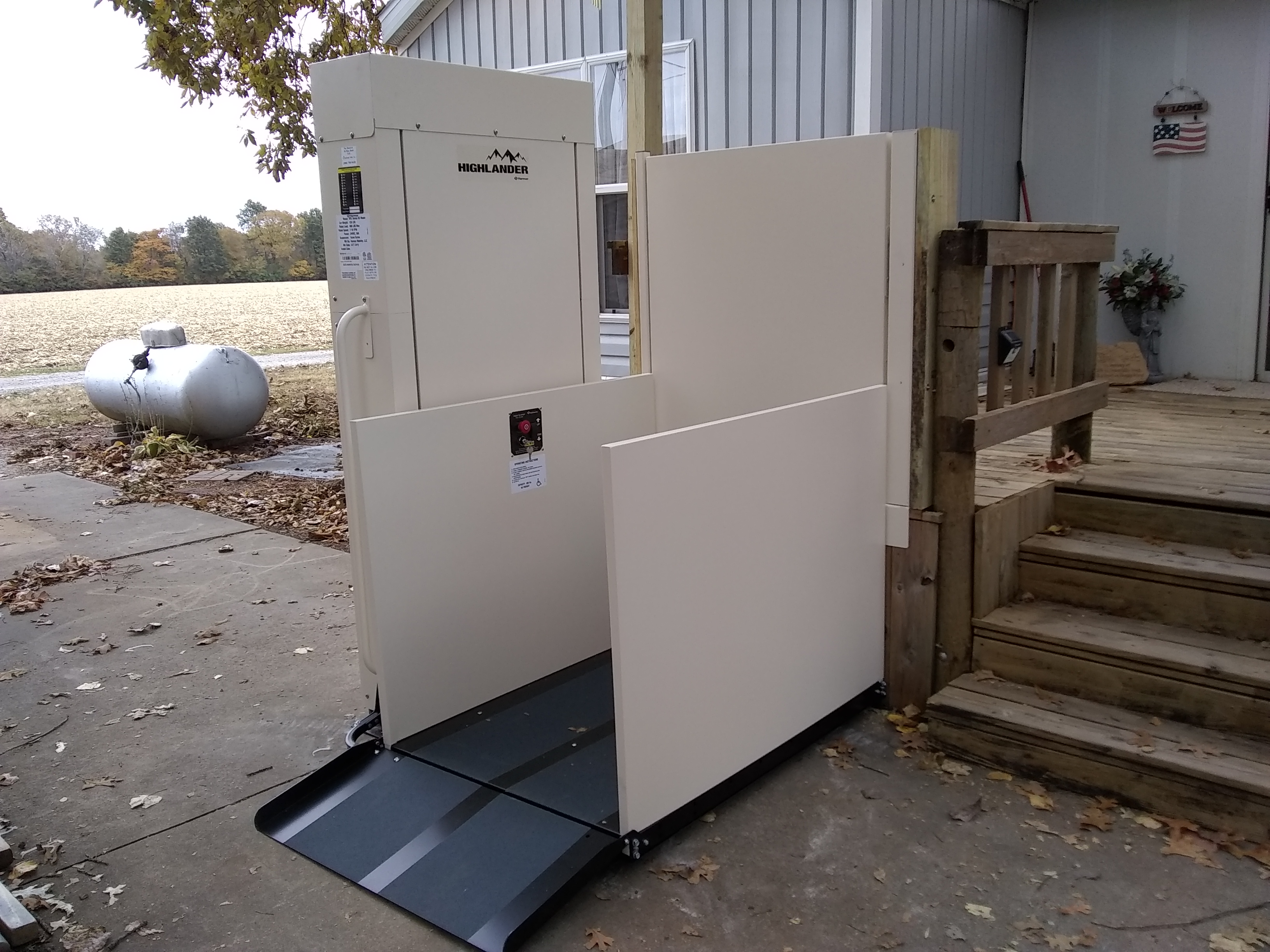
Residential wheelchair lift installed against raised deck

A residential wheelchair lift is typically installed inside or outside of an individual's home to provide wheelchair access. Most often the wheelchair lift is installed against a deck, porch, or raised entryway door. The lift can take the place of a set of stairs in some situations. Additionally, a set of stairs and a landing can be custom built to provide access via the lift or stairs.

Commercial wheelchair lifts are often installed to meet ADA requirements, when an elevator is cost prohibitive or will be used only occasionally. These lifts are typically planned for during the construction or renovation of a commercial/business space. Commercial wheelchair lifts can be found in restaurants, bars, churches, community centers, and many other places of business.

== Indoor vs. outdoor vertical lifts ==
An indoor vertical platform lift operates much like an elevator which is installed within a hoist-way or shaft-way. Although the installation of a vertical platform lift is similar to that of an elevator, it's much less expensive. Some models offer options to finish a vertical platform lift to make it operate more like a home elevator.

An outdoor vertical platform may include factory-built enclosures that protect the user from the weather and keep them dry. The enclosure acts as a shaft-way inside the unit with gates or doors that are added to the entrance or exit.

== See also ==
- Adapted automobile
- Bridge plate
- Home lift
- Stairlift
- Walter Harris Callow, inventor of wheelchair-accessible bus
- Wheelchair ramp
