= Home lift =

Elevator for use in a residential home

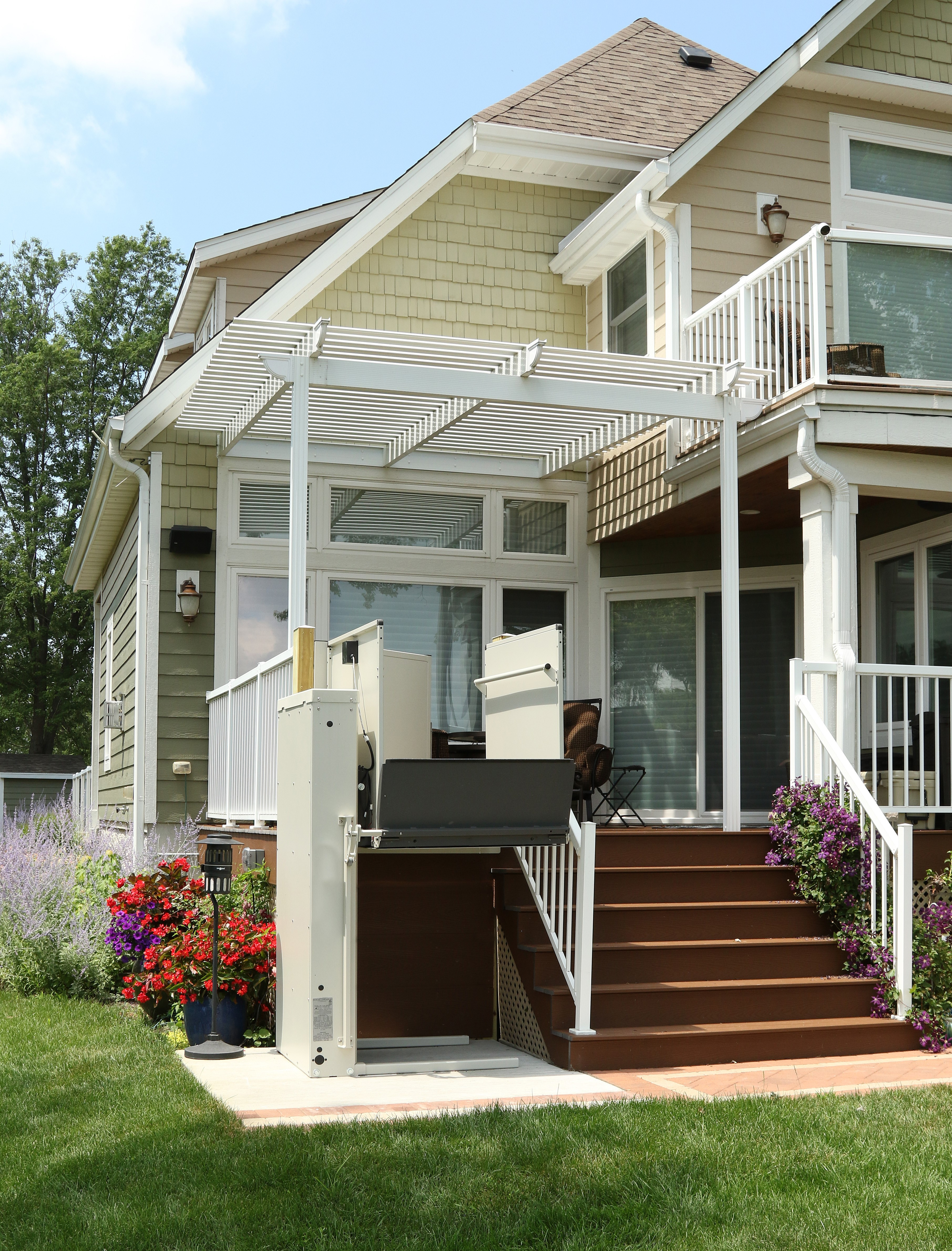
Residential lift used to circumvent porch stairs at the entrance (e.g. for wheelchair users)

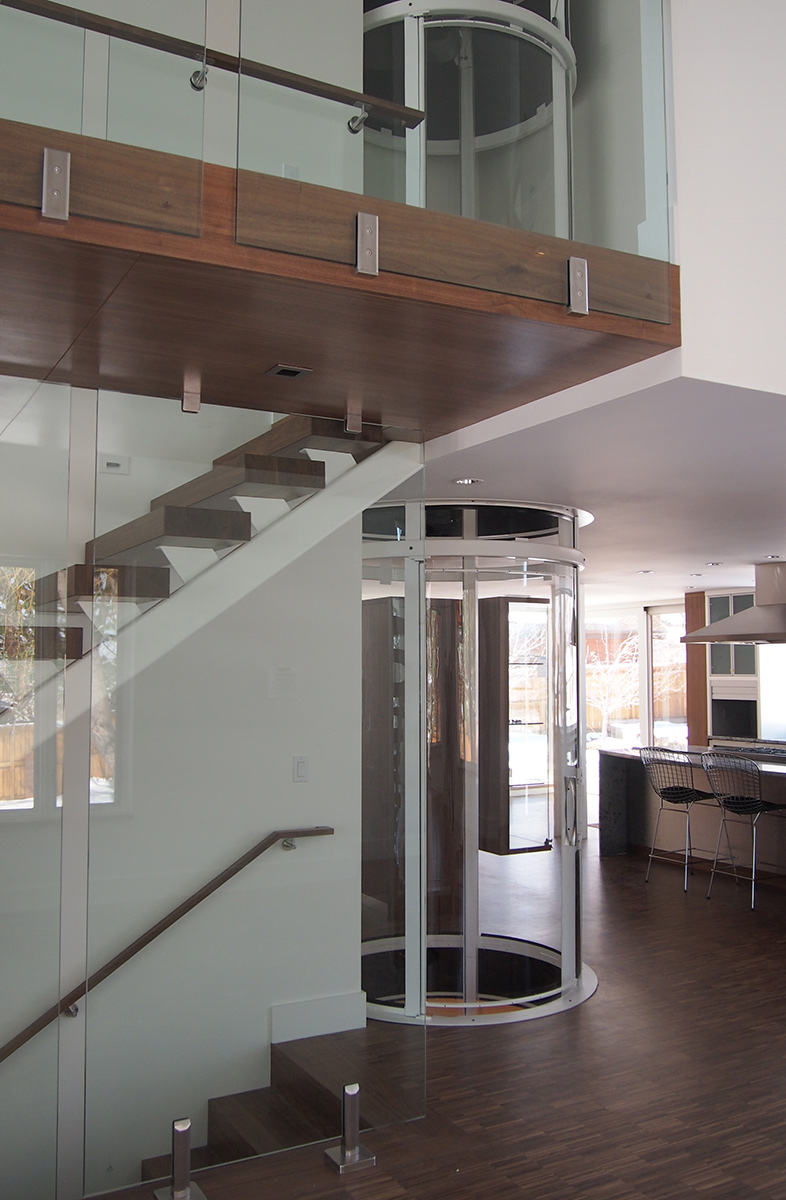
Residential elevator with closed cab and a machineroom-less design

A home lift is a type of lift specifically designed for private homes. Home lifts do not require a shaft and usually has an open cab, which means that they generally can be more basic and lower cost, compared to a home elevator which requires a shaft and usually has an enclosed cab.

Home lifts usually takes into consideration the following non-functional requirements:

- Compact design in view of the limitations of space in a private residence
- Usage of the lift restricted primarily to the residents of the private homes
- Special facilities to meet the needs of elderly or disabled persons, including wheelchair users
- Quiet, smooth and jerk-free movement of the lift
- Controls have ease of operation

A home lift may be linked to specific country codes or directives. For example, the European standard of Machine Directive 2006 42 EC requires compliance with 194 parameters of safety for a lift to be installed inside a private property.

== Overview ==
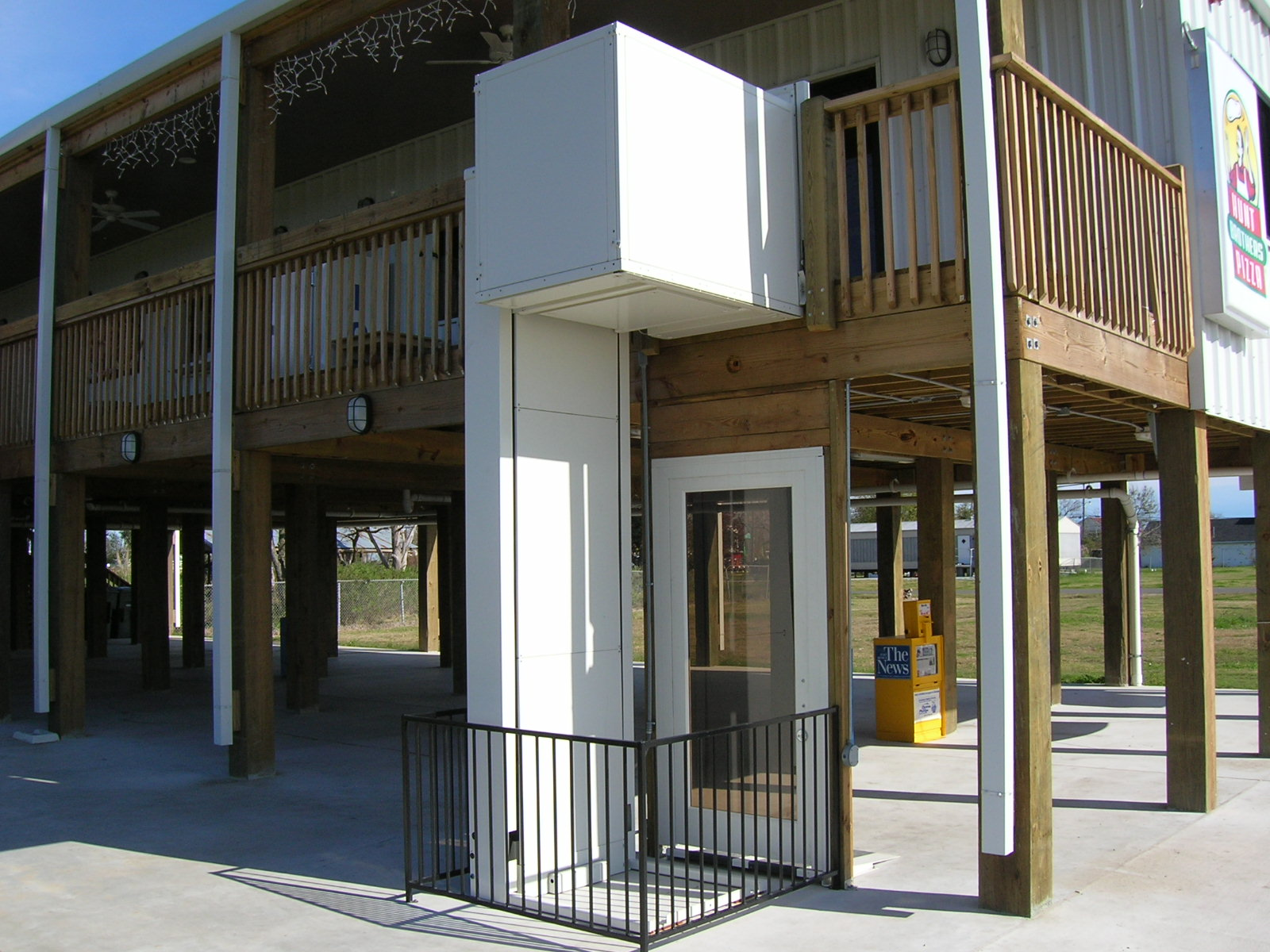
Outdoor lift from ground to first floor

Home lifts are compact lifts for 2 to 4 persons which typically run on domestic electricity. Unlike hydraulic lifts or traditional "gear and counterweight" operated elevators, a home lift doesn't require additional space for machine room, over head, or pit, making it more suitable for domestic and private use. Often, maintenance costs are also lower than a more conventional lift.

The driving system for a home lift can be built inside the lift structure itself and features a screw, an electric motor, and a nut mounted behind the control panel of the lift's platform; it is thus referred to as a "screw and nut" system. When the lift is operated, the engine forces the nut to rotate around the screw, pushing the lift up and down. Most home lifts come with an open platform structure to free even more space and grant access from 3 different sides of the platform. This requires all producers to include specific safety mechanisms and, in some countries, to limit the travel speed..

Home lifts have been present on the market for decades, and represent a growing trend. Many home lifts producers sell their products through their network, but it is not rare to see them providing their lifts to bigger elevating system groups. Several lift manufacturers enter new markets like India with customization and installation partners who have scaled up their technical capabilities.

== Types ==
=== Electric home lifts ===
Electric home lifts are powered by an electric motor that plugs into a common power socket (e.g. 13 A), like any other household appliance. They use a steel roped drum-braked gear motor drive system which means it is self-contained within the roof space of the lift car itself. 'Through floor' dual rail lifts create a self-supporting structure and the weight of the entire structure and lift are in compression through the rails into the floor of the home.

=== Cable-driven home lifts ===
Cable-driven home lifts consist of a shaft, a cabin, a control system and counterweights. Some models also require a technical room. Cable-driven lifts are similar to those found in commercial buildings. These elevators take up most space due to the shaft and the equipment room, so installing a cable system in a new building is much easier than trying to retrofit an existing building. Traction elevators need a pulley system for movement. They are less common for new buildings, as hydraulic technology is used in most cases.

=== Chain-driven home lifts ===
Chain-driven home lifts are similar to cable-driven lifts, but they use a chain wrapped around a drum instead of a cable to raise and lower the car. Chains are more durable than cables and do not need to be replaced as often. Chain-driven home lifts also do not require a separate machine room, which saves space.

=== Machine room-less home lifts ===
Machine room-less home lifts operate by sliding up and down a travel path with a counterweight. This type is an excellent choice for existing residential buildings, since neither machine rooms nor pits reaching into the ground are required. However, traction elevators still require additional space above the elevator roof to accommodate the components required to raise and lower the car. Shaftless home lifts consist of a rectangular elevator cabin positioned on a rail. The lift travels on the route from the lower floor to the upper floor and back.

=== Hydraulic home lifts ===
Hydraulic home lifts are driven by a piston that moves in a cylinder. Since the drive system is completely housed in the elevator shaft, no machine room is required and the control system is small enough to fit into a cabinet on a wall near the elevator. For hydraulic systems with holes, the cylinder must extend to the depth of the floor corresponding to the feet of the elevator, while hydraulic systems without holes do not require a pit.

=== Pneumatic home lifts ===
See: Pneumatic elevators

Pneumatic home lifts use a vacuum system inside a tube to drive their movement. A pit or machine room is not required, so pneumatic home lifts are easiest to retrofit into an existing home. Pneumatic lifts consist of acrylic or glass tubes (typically about 800 mm in diameter). It looks like a larger version of Pneumatic mail tubes found in older buildings. Pneumatic elevators are not hidden in the wall and are normally placed in the near a staircase.

=== Screw-nut driven home lifts ===
Screw-nut driven home lifts are designed around the concept of a motor that rotates a nut, which turns the screw thus moves the lift up and down. It's known to be reliable, safe and space efficient, and requires less maintenance than hydraulic or belt driven elevators. Most commonly used up to 6 floors.

== See also ==
- Elevator
- Stairlift
- Wheelchair lift
- Scissor lift
