= Levitt Ellsworth Custer =

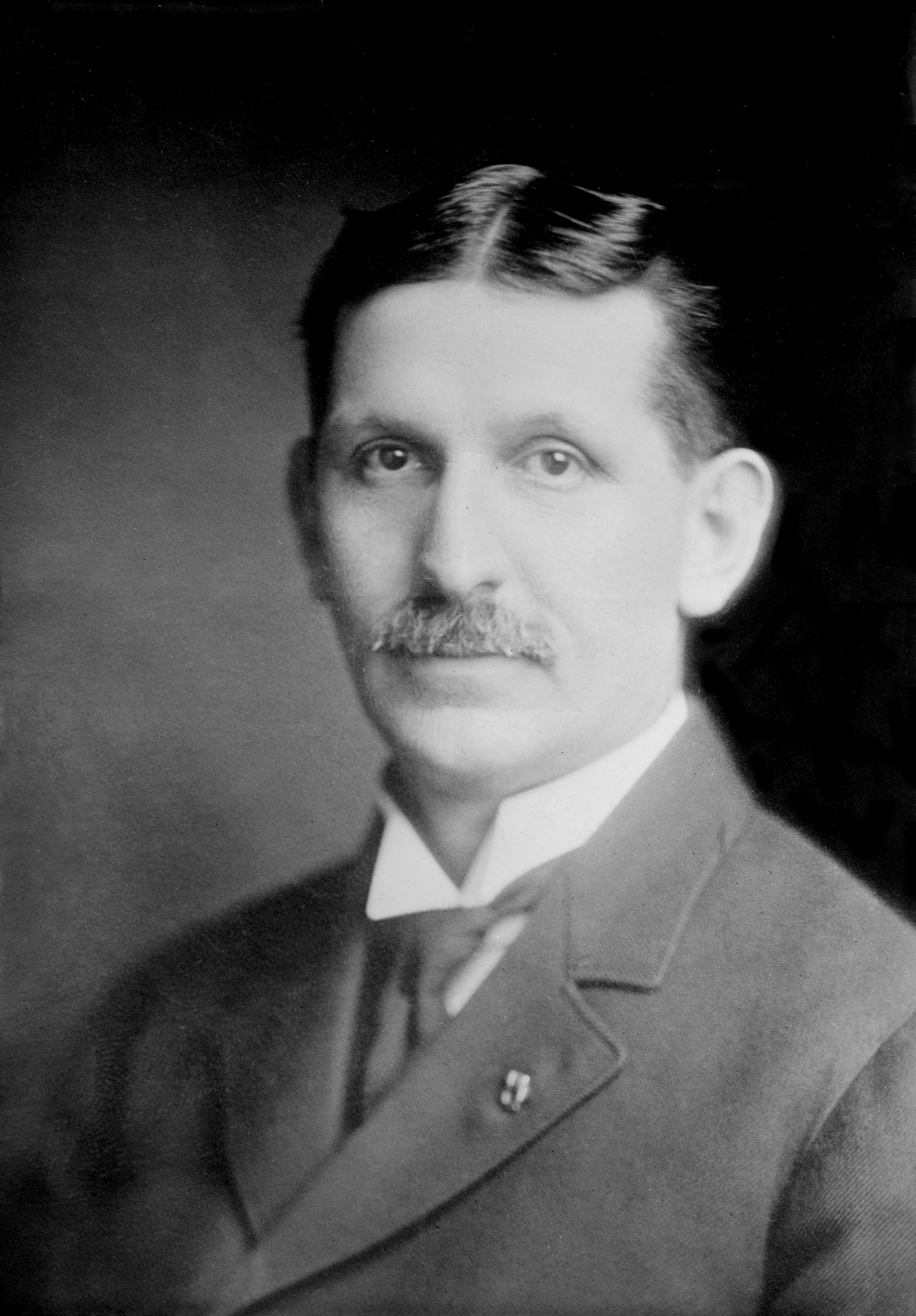
- Custer circa 1912
- Born: June 18, 1863; Perrysville, Ohio, U.S.
- Died: January 3, 1924 (aged 60)
- Education: Otterbein University
- Children: Levitt Luzern Custer
- Parent: Isaac Newton Custer

Levitt Ellsworth Custer (June 18, 1863 – January 3, 1924) was an Ohio dentist and competitive balloonist.

== Biography ==
He was born on June 18, 1863, in Perrysville, Ohio, to Isaac Newton Custer, a dentist. He attended the public schools in New Philadelphia, Ohio, and Westerville, Ohio. He saved for college from 1878 to 1879 by playing the cornet with a river circus band that traveled from Cincinnati, Ohio, to New Orleans, Louisiana. Then attended Otterbein University and graduated in 1884. He then attended the Ohio College of Dental Surgery in 1885.

He married Effie Zimmerman, and had as his son, inventor Levitt Luzern Custer. Custer received a single patent himself, awarded in 1905, for a "Shield and Support for X-Ray Tubes".

In 1912 Custer took part piloting the Cole in the annual National Elimination balloon race, held by the Aero Club of America. Custer died on January 3, 1924.
