= Stair lift =

Chair to move people up and down stairs

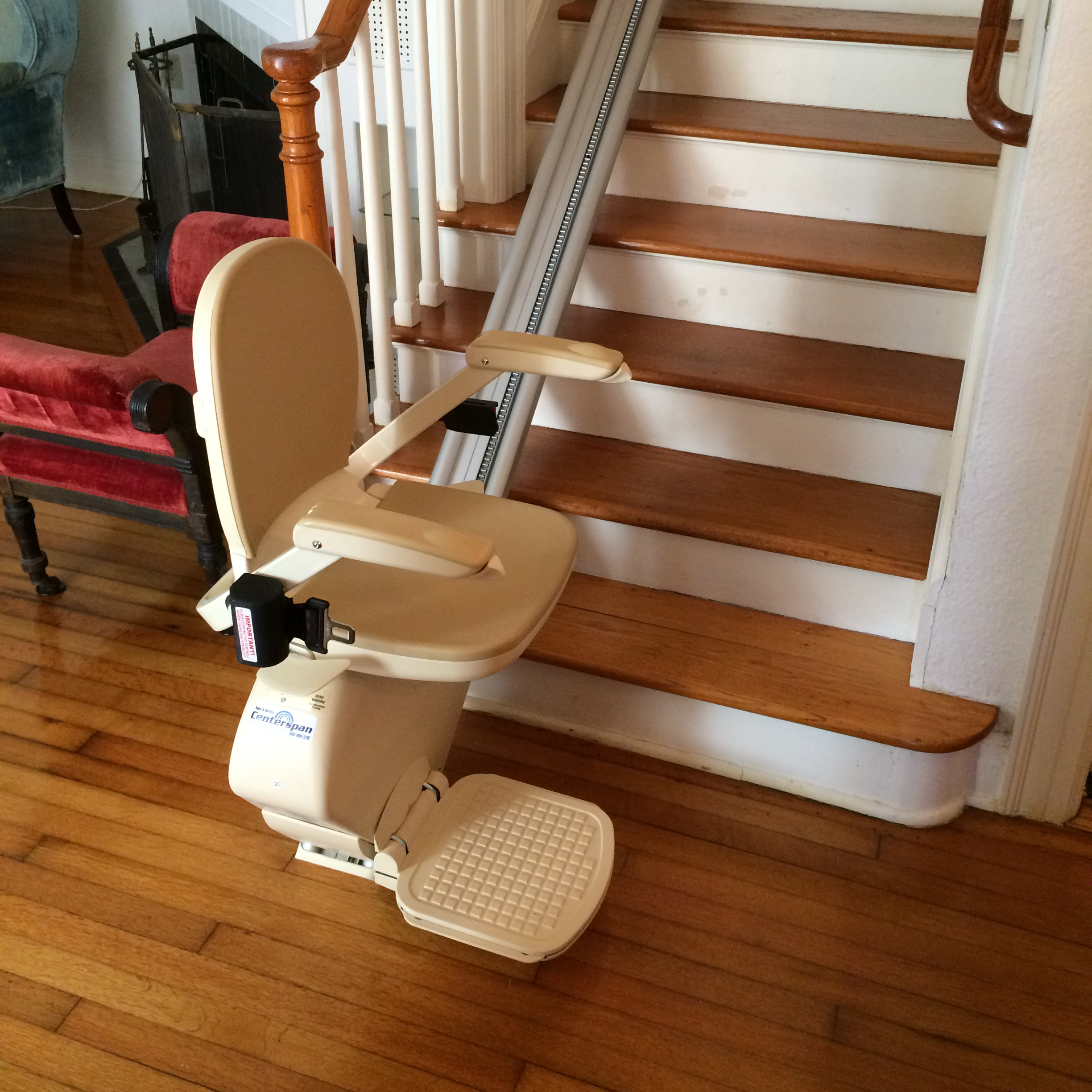
A medical stair lift

A stair lift is a mechanical device for lifting people, typically those with mobility impairments, up and down stairs. For sufficiently wide stairs, a rail is mounted to the treads of the stairs. A chair or lifting platform is attached to the rail. A person gets onto the chair or platform and is lifted up or down the stairs by the chair which moves along the rail.

Stair lifts are known variously as stairlifts, stair gliders, stair-lifts, chair lifts (but distinct from the chairlift used by skiers) and by other names. The term stair climber can refer either to stair lifts, or more commonly to the exercise equipment by the same name.

Some of the first stair lifts to be produced commercially were advertised and sold in the U.S. in the 1930s by the Inclinator Company of America. Many users at the time were victims of polio.

== History ==
In the 1920s, C.C. Crispen, a Pennsylvania entrepreneur, created a way to enable an ailing friend to travel from floor to floor. Crispen's idea was to design a seat that could climb stairs. A self-taught engineer, he built the first prototype of the inclining chair. He called it the Inclin-ator.

== Features ==
Modern stair lifts can be found with a wide variety of features such as adjustable seat height, battery isolation switches, call stations, 'flip-up' rail, key switch, folding step, speed governor, seat belt, soft start and soft stop.

== Rails ==
Straight rails for use on domestic staircases are usually made from extruded aluminum or steel and come in various cross-sectional shapes. These rails may, typically, weigh over 30 kg (66 lb), depending on the length. In most applications they are attached to the steps with metal brackets (sometimes called "cleats").

If a rail crosses a doorway at the bottom of the stairs or causes an obstruction, a hinge can be fitted so the end of the rail can be folded back out of the way when not in use.

Curved rails are made from materials such as steel or aluminum and come in various cross-sectional shapes according to the designer. Individual designs vary a lot and probably the key criterion is to make the curves with the smallest radius possible so they will wrap tightly around objects such as newel posts.

== Carriages ==
The carriage is the component which moves along the rail and normally runs on small diameter rollers. In most designs the carriage is pulled by a cable or chain, or driven along the inclined rail by a rack and pinion system or other drive arrangement.

Most domestic carriages have a seat with arms and a footrest. Some special models have a stand-on platform also known as a "perch" seat. For users with shorter legs a short seat can be fitted, to make the lift more comfortable to sit on. Seats can be tailored to suit individual needs.

The conventional layout for a typical domestic stair lift is to have the seat perpendicular to the rail so the user travels "sidesaddle". At the top of the staircase the seat can be swiveled, commonly through around 45 degrees or 90 degrees, then locked in place to allow the user to alight from it onto a landing. Stair lifts are available with either a manual swivel or a powered swivel, depending on the users ability.

Most swivel seats have a safety switch so the stair lift will not move unless the seat is locked into its travel position. Special models with seats facing the bottom of the staircase have been produced for users with conditions which prevent use of the conventional seat layout.

== Popular types ==
=== Straight-rail stair lifts ===
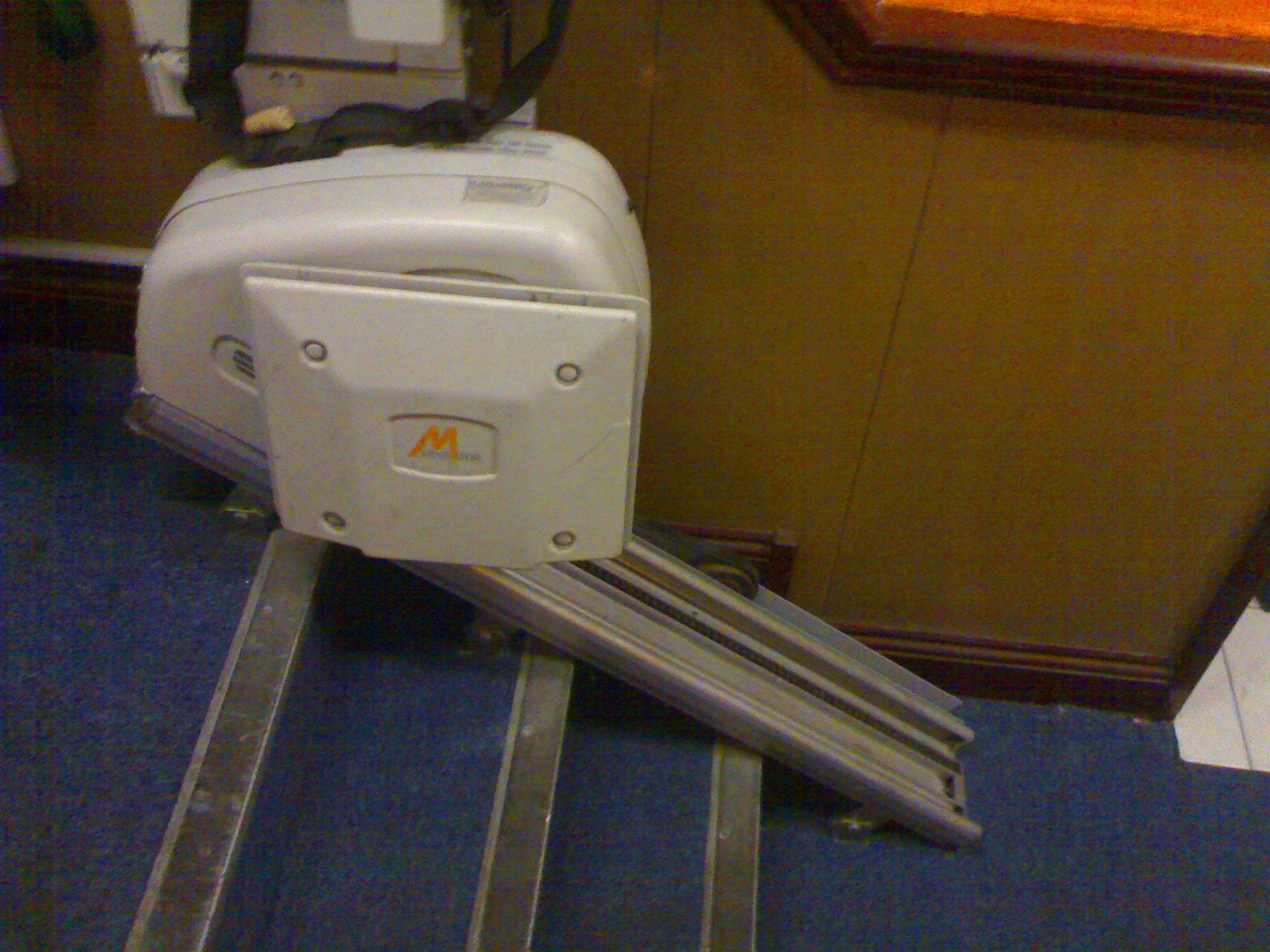
A restaurant stair lift

These are the most common type of stair lifts used in private dwellings with straight stairs and have a straight rail (track) which is attached to the steps of the staircase. Straight-rail stair lifts can usually be installed within days of being ordered and, having a rail which is simply cut to length from a stock part, they are the least expensive stair lifts.

=== Curved-rail stair lifts ===
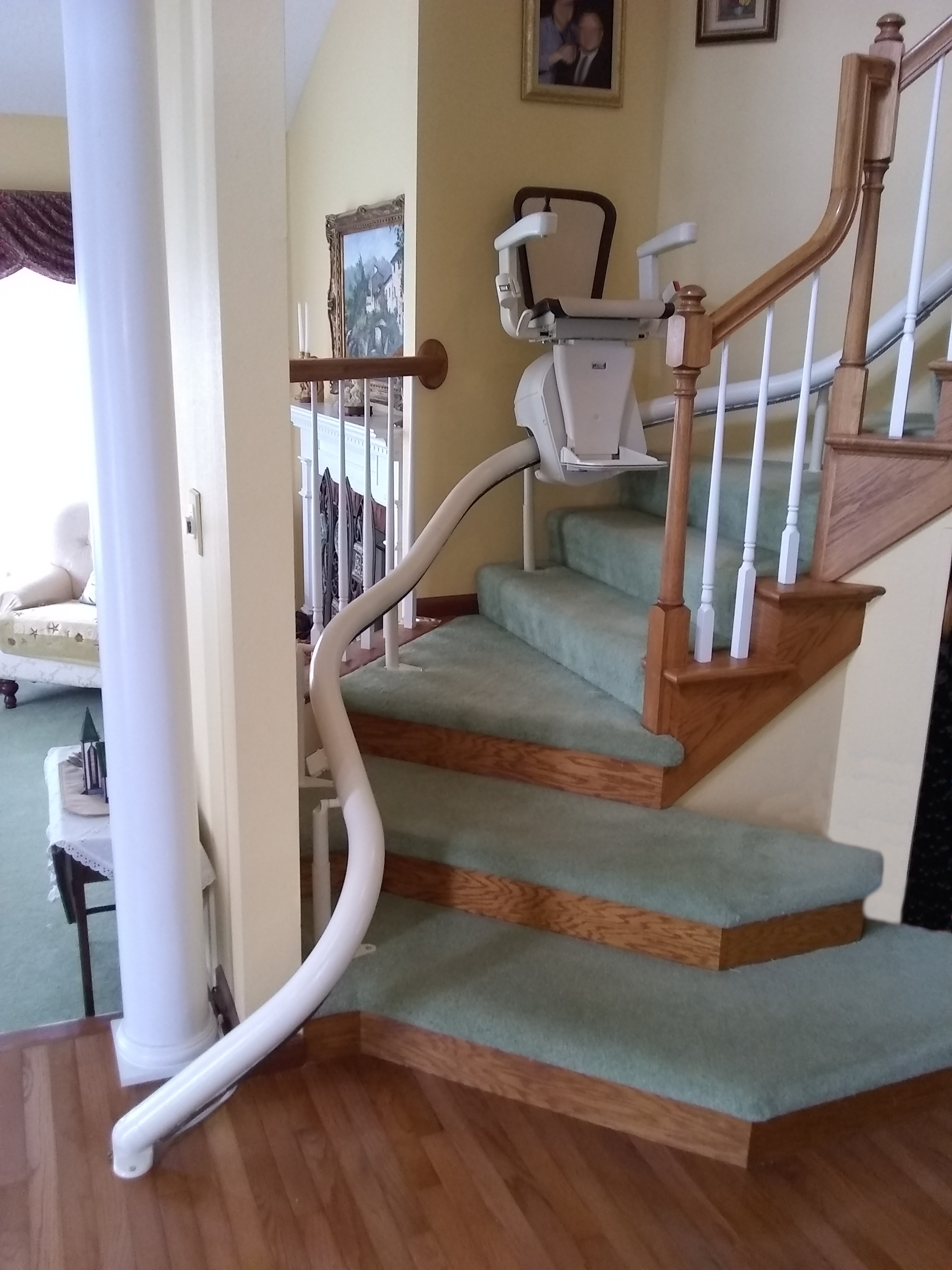
A curved stair lift

Curved stair lifts are made to follow the shape of an individual staircase (curved stairs). On staircases with intermediate flat landings they eliminate the need for multiple straight stair lifts by providing a continuous ride up the entire length of the staircase. Because the rail is custom-made to follow the staircase, and because the chair is more complex than on a straight-rail stair lift (it has to be able to remain level while traveling along a track which changes direction and angle), curved-rail stair lifts are more costly than stair lifts for straight stairs.

=== Wheelchair vertical platform stair lifts ===
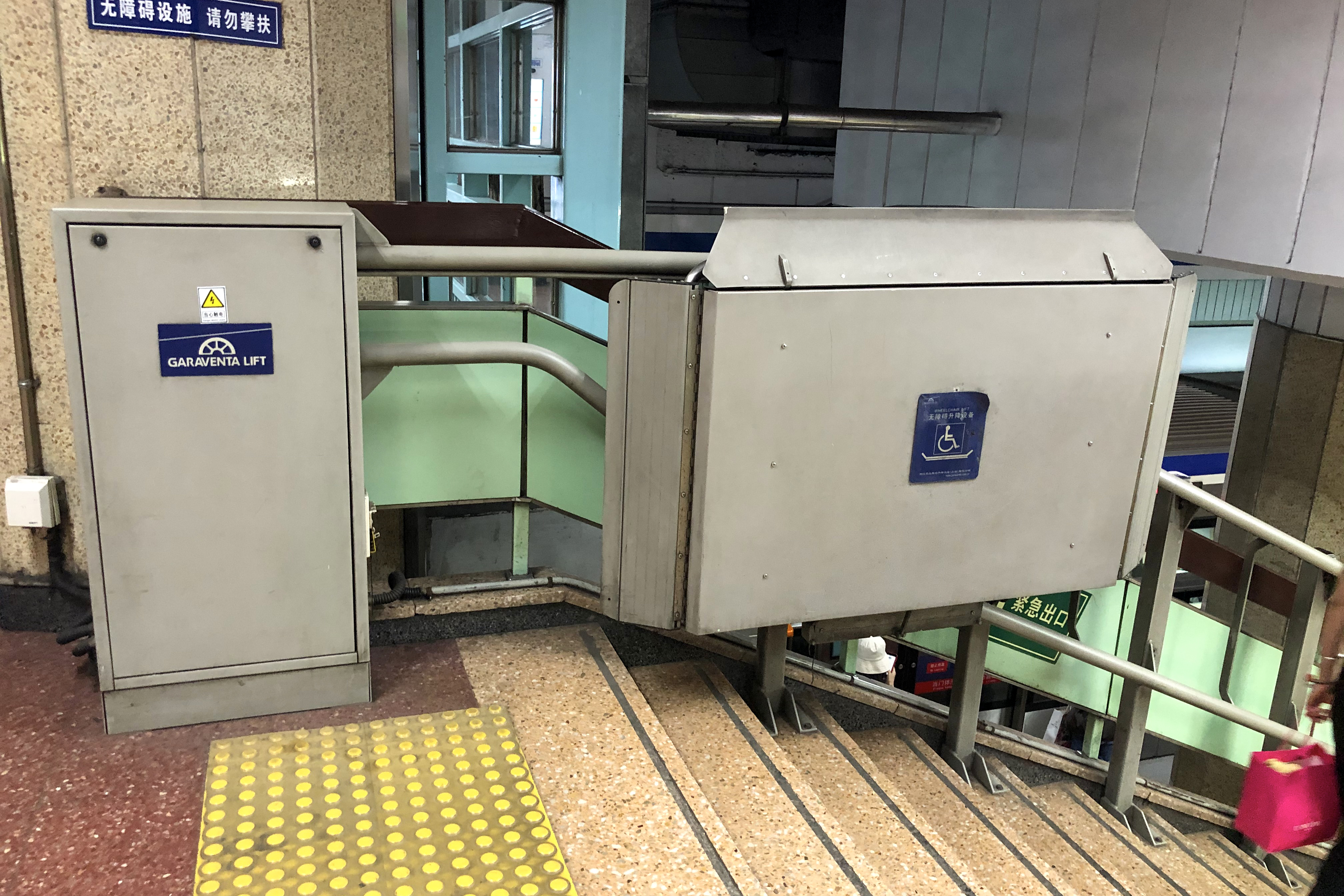
A stair lift with wheelchair platform at Dongsi Shitiao station, Beijing Subway

Vertical platform lifts come under the general definition of a stair lift and are usually of a much heavier construction than a domestic stair lift due to the fact they are going to transport a wheelchair or scooter and the person.

Most platform stair lifts are used in public access buildings or inside and outside private homes.

The platform is large enough to accommodate a wheelchair or scooter and its user, and may have folding edge flaps which drop down and act as ramps to allow for variations in floor levels. These flaps also prevent the wheelchair from going over the edge of the platform.

The rails are, necessarily, of heavy construction to support the load and the drive system is usually accommodated within a tubular section rail or aluminum extrusion. Some models have steel cables inside the tube, others have chains; yet others may use a rack and pinion system.

Many wheelchair platform stairlifts are designed and built to order. Others may comprise a standard platform and carriage, with the only special requirement being the length of rails or tracks.

Some stair lift chairs can also be moved and used as indoor wheelchairs.

=== Outdoor stair lifts ===
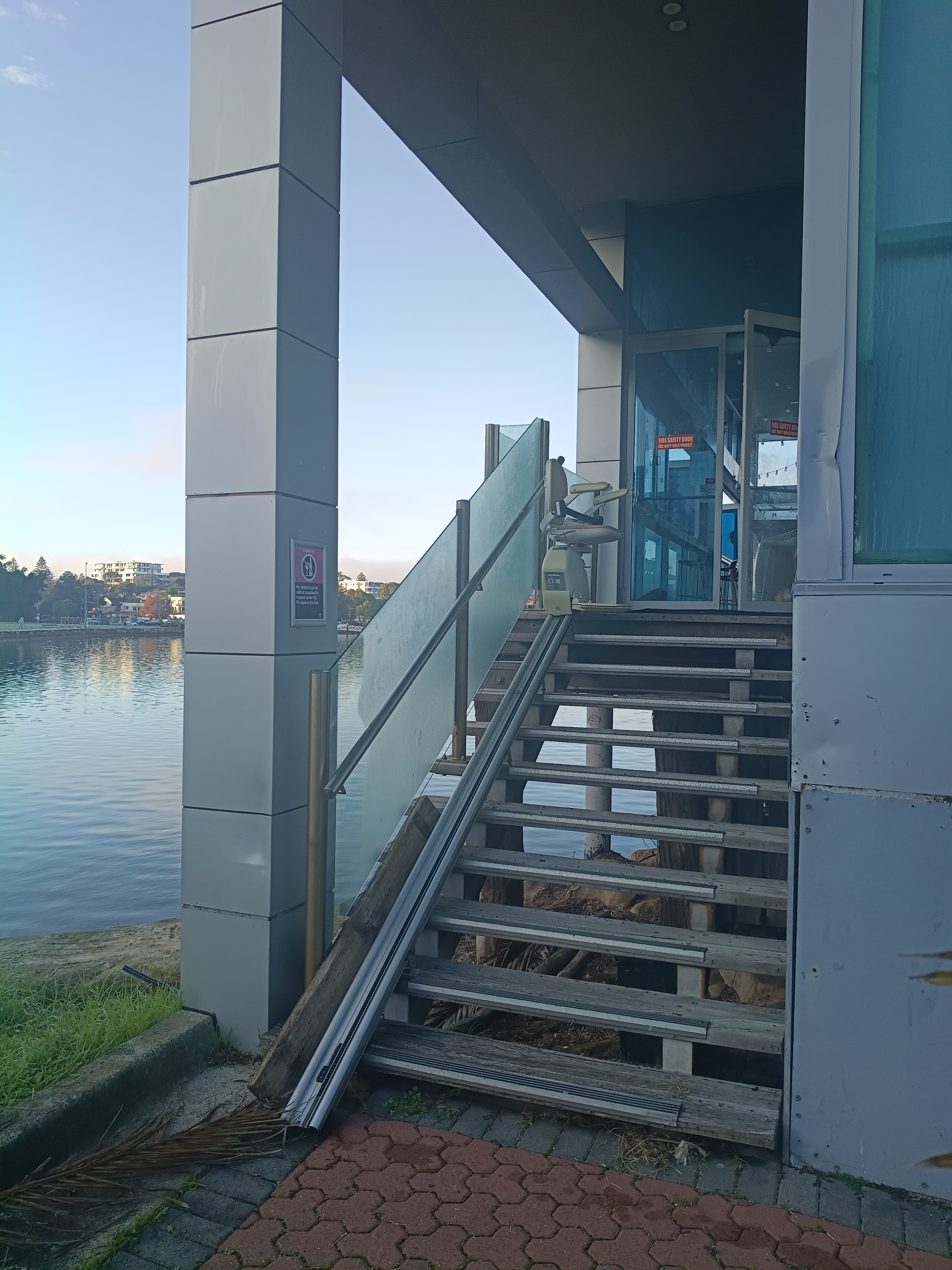
Weather-resistant outdoor stair lifts installed at Drifter's Wharf in Gosford, New South Wales.

Outdoor stair lifts are available for straight and curved staircases. They operate similar to indoor stair lifts but include weather-resistant features to help the unit withstand extreme harsh temperatures and weather conditions. Most often, outdoor stair lifts are used on staircases for decks, home entryways or lake access.

=== Goods stair lifts ===
Some manufacturers produce stair lifts with trays instead of seats for moving goods between different levels, usually in commercial or industrial buildings. Some businesses have purchased normal domestic stair lifts purely as goods transporters.

== AC and DC power ==
Early stair lifts mostly had alternating current (AC) drive motors which ran at full mains voltage (around 115 volts in North America, 230 volts in Europe). An "energy chain" ran alongside or through the rail to carry the power cable from the supply point to the carriage.

More recently, domestic stair lifts have been powered from rechargeable batteries and use direct current (DC). One of the selling points is that a DC stair lift will continue to function during a power outage, provided the batteries are sufficiently charged. Most stair lifts have a 'charge point' where the unit will 'park' to charge its batteries. Some straight stair lifts have the ability to charge continuously no matter where they are left along the track.

With most DC models the batteries are accommodated within the carriage and travel with it.

Some models, however, were designed with three phase motors and the batteries (three in total) were housed in a cabinet mounted near the top or bottom of the rail. An inverter system was used to convert the DC energy to three phase AC.

The power rating of drive motors for domestic straight rail stair lifts may be around 250 watts. The power requirement will be greater for heavy loads, very steep inclines, and wheelchair platform stair lifts.

== Controls ==
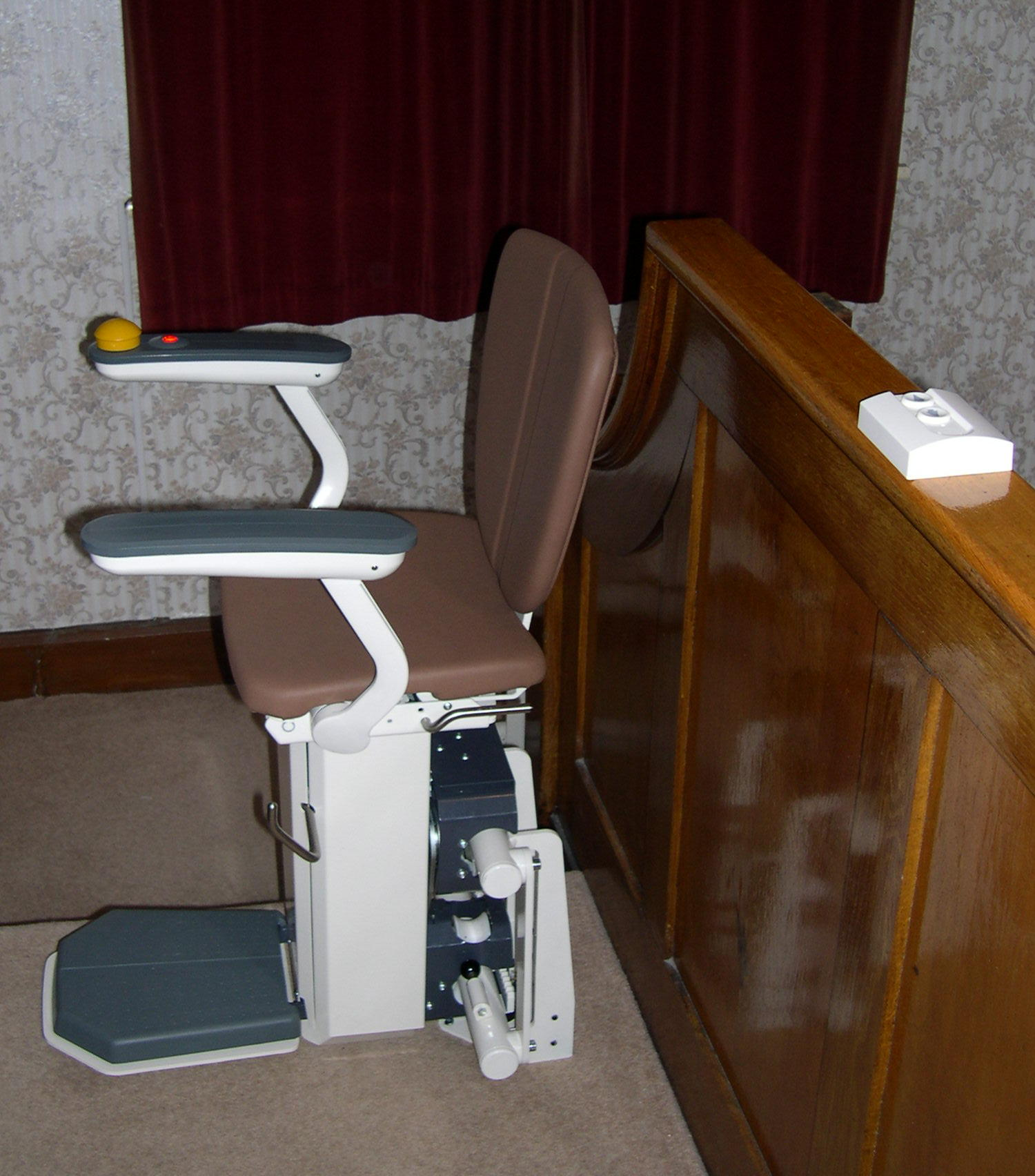
Stairlift with remote control

Stair lifts are largely operated using a control on the arm of the lift. This is either a switch or a toggle type lever. This larger toggle switch enables users even with limited mobility or painful condition to use stair lifts easily and safely.

Electronic controls are used extensively. Many stair lifts have radio frequency or infrared remote controllers. It is known that radiation from devices such as fluorescent lights can interfere with infrared stair lift controls. Also, heat and incandescent lights can, in some circumstances, have an adverse effect.

Control circuit design varies greatly among the different manufacturers and models. Curved rail stair lifts have more complex controls than those with straight rails.

The seat of a curved rail stair lift may have to be tilted so it remains horizontal whilst going around curves and negotiates different angles of incline. This requires an additional motor and link system.

Also, the carriage is slowed down on bends but travels faster on straight runs. This means a more complex control system. Modern controls have small microprocessors which "learn" the characteristics of the journeys and keep the data in memory. They also record the number of journey and direction. This assists service engineers on maintenance calls.

Some development of self-diagnostic controls began at the onset of the 21st century. The idea was that stair lifts would predict when components were starting to deteriorate and automatically pass the information to the service provider so a visit could be arranged.

== Safety ==
To comply with safety codes, stair lifts usually have cut-out switches connected to "safety edges" and other protective devices so the drive power is disconnected if something goes wrong. Modern lifts have a high degree of comfort, but safety is always paramount. "Safety edges" are a common feature to the power pack and footplate. "Safety edges" ensure that if there is any obstruction on the stairs the stair lift will automatically stop and only travel away from the obstruction.

Stair lifts usually have seat belts that help keep the rider positioned properly while using the lift. Some lifts also include a seat belt sensor so the lift will only move if the seat belt is securely fastened during operation.

== Self-installation ==
Today, self-installation of stair lifts is becoming a common trend for people interested in DIY projects. Stair lifts are available for purchase that can be self-installed.

Professionals do not recommend that people attempt to install these products themselves.

== See also ==
- Central–Mid-Levels escalator (Hong Kong)
- Elevator
- Escalator
- Funicular
- Home lift
- Lift chair
- Moving walkway
- People mover
- Shopping cart conveyor
- Wheelchair lift
