= Levitt Luzern Custer =

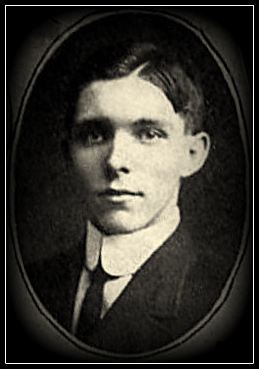
- Custer in 1909
- Born: July 27, 1888; Dayton, Ohio
- Died: August 30, 1962 (aged 74); Dayton, Ohio
- Education: Otterbein University; Massachusetts Institute of Technology
- Parent: Levitt Ellsworth Custer

Levitt Luzern Custer (July 27, 1888 – August 30, 1962) was the inventor of the statoscope and early motorized wheelchair, called the Custer chair.

== Biography ==
He was born in Dayton, Ohio, on July 27, 1888, to Levitt Ellsworth Custer. He graduated from Otterbein University in 1909 and then the Massachusetts Institute of Technology in 1913. His first patented invention was the statoscope which showed whether an aerostat was ascending or descending. Custer produced the device for the United States Navy at his factory, Custer Specialty Company, on North Ludlow Street in Dayton, Ohio. He invented a motorized wheelchair in 1919.

He died on August 30, 1962, in Dayton, Ohio.

== Legacy ==
His papers are archived at Wright State University.
