= Mobility scooter =

Mobility aid

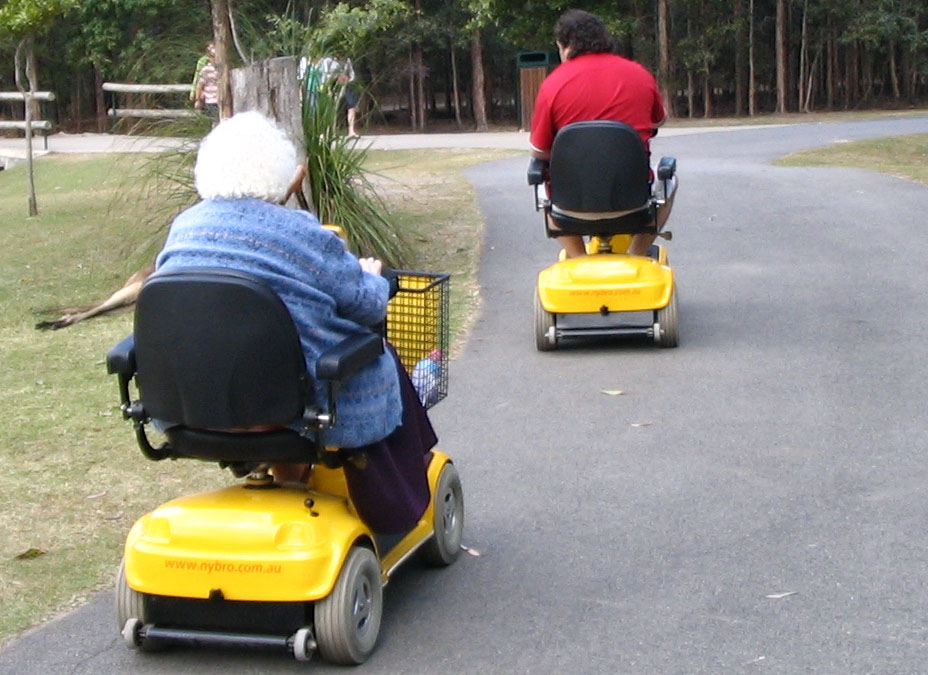
Two people using mobility scooters

A mobility scooter is an electric personal transporter used as mobility aid for people with physical impairment, mostly auxiliary to a powered wheelchair but configured like a motorscooter. When motorized, they function as micromobility devices and are commonly referred to as a powered vehicle/scooter or electric scooter. A motorized mobility scooter may also be referred to as an electric convenience vehicle (ECV), and are often referred to as gophers in Australia, owing to the first mobility scooter branded under that name around 1980.

Non-motorized mobility scooters are less common, but are intended for the estimated 60% of wheelchair-users who have at least some use of their legs. While leg issues are commonly assumed to be the reason for using scooters, the vehicles are used by those with a wide range of conditions, from spinal injuries to neurological disorders.

Mobility scooters differ from power wheelchairs in that they are usually cheaper, somewhat easier to move across uneven ground, and are more customizable. They are built for people who have trouble walking or getting around, but do not always need a power wheelchair. They are also used by people who do need a powerchair for intermediate distances or extended standing, or those not permitted to drive cars for medical reasons.

== History ==
The first vehicle somewhat resembling a mobility scooter was introduced in 1954, and billed by Sears as an electric wheelchair. It bore a large seat, an extra large battery capacity and a three-wheeled design. However the seat was shaped like a motorcycle seat - which offered no back support - making it unsuitable for disabled people suffering from common conditions such as skeletomuscular disorders or fatigue. It was not a commercial success.

Around or before 1980, Grant Telfer of Telfer Engineering, Monash, South Australia, created three- and four-wheeled electric scooters, using the brand name "Gopher". These had a type of bucket seat with a backrest and sides. He coined the name "gopher" for mobility scooters, and the name stuck, being adopted as a generic name for these mobility aids. As well as being used as a generic name in Australia, "Gopher" is also used as a model name for mobility scooters made by Pride Mobility in Australia.

== Description ==
A mobility scooter has a seat over three, four or more wheels, sometimes a flat area or foot plates for the feet, and handlebars or a delta-style steering arrangement in front to turn the steerable wheels. The seat may swivel to allow access when the front is blocked by the handlebars. Mobility scooters are usually battery powered. A battery or two is stored on board the scooter and is charged via an onboard or separate battery charger unit from standard electric power. Gasoline-powered scooters may also be available in some countries, though they are rapidly being replaced by electric models. User-powered scooters are propelled by a lever used in a push-pull rowing motion to provide exercise and mobility at the same time.

The tiller, with forward/reverse directions and speed controls, is the steering column central at the front of the scooter. The tiller may contain other features also, for example, a speed limiter, lighting controls (for nighttime use) and turn signals. A battery use indicator is also often included. Forward/reverse direction can be controlled by thumb paddles, finger controls, or a switch. There are two types of mobility scooters: front-wheel drive (FD) or rear-wheel drive (RD). The front-wheel drive is usually a smaller device and is best used indoors. Rider weight capacity is a minimum of 77 kg (170 pounds) generally upwards to 440 kg (980 pounds) maximum. The rear-wheel drive is used both indoors and outdoors with rider weight capacity of 160 kg (350 pounds). A heavy duty rear-drive can carry up to 230 kg (500 pounds), varying by manufacturer.

The device is also sometimes referred to as an electric convenience vehicle (ECV).

Mobility scooters come in various types:

- user-powered, small, light manual scooters for travel, without battery or motor, propelled by a central lever drive (CLD) in a push-pull rowing motion to provide mobility and exercise at the same time. Some models look like large tricycles without pedals that the estimated 60% of wheelchair users who have at least some use of their legs can self-propel while stimulating muscles and exercising.
- small, light scooters for travel, which fold or are easily disassembled into smaller parts for transport;
- large, heavy scooters for rough outdoor terrain;
- mid-range scooters, which are intended for both indoor and outdoor use.
- slow and steady, used for shopping in stores and other places.

Usually, mid-range mobility scooters have a speed of about 8 to 11 km/h (5 to 7 mph). Mobility scooters typically have a seat that is between 40 and 50 cm (16 and 20 inches), but many of them have various seat options available during purchase.

== Advantages ==
Assistive and small sit-down electric mobility scooters provide important advantages to people with mobility problems throughout the world. A scooter is useful for persons without the stamina or arm/shoulder flexibility necessary to use a manual wheelchair. Also, swiveling the seat of an electric scooter is generally easier than moving the foot supports on most conventional wheelchairs. A mobility scooter is very helpful for persons with systemic or whole-body disabling conditions (coronary or lung issues, multiple sclerosis, ehlers danlos syndrome, some forms of arthritis, obesity, etc.) who are still able to stand and walk a few steps, sit upright without torso support, and control the steering tiller.

A major selling point of mobility scooters for many users is that they are (slightly) better able to traverse poorly-designed kerbs, whilst also being able to carry belongings such as shopping - without the expense or license requirements of having a car. Some people say they like mobility scooters because they are assigned less disability stigma by abled people. The intermediate-distance advantages of mobility scooters versus powerchairs is due to their bigger wheels, large motors and suspension systems: this gives them the ability to better handle uneven pavements and steeper hills. Mobility scooters can therefore be used as alternatives to the car within towns but outside cities; in ways that (aside from chairs with chunky powerwheel attachments) power wheelchairs cannot. Scooters are not replacements for wheelchairs; rather, they go easily over challenging ground where power wheelchairs struggle. Conversely, powerchairs have advantages over most scooters when it comes to fitting into accessible public transport systems. Scooters can be more affordable than powered wheelchairs.

Recently, manufacturers have been modifying the appearance of scooters. Mobility scooters were shortened, thinned to look like small cars, and others to look akin to motorcycles. The redesign aims to reduce the stigma carried by mobility scooter users but also to improve handling all-weather conditions.

== Types of mobility scooters ==
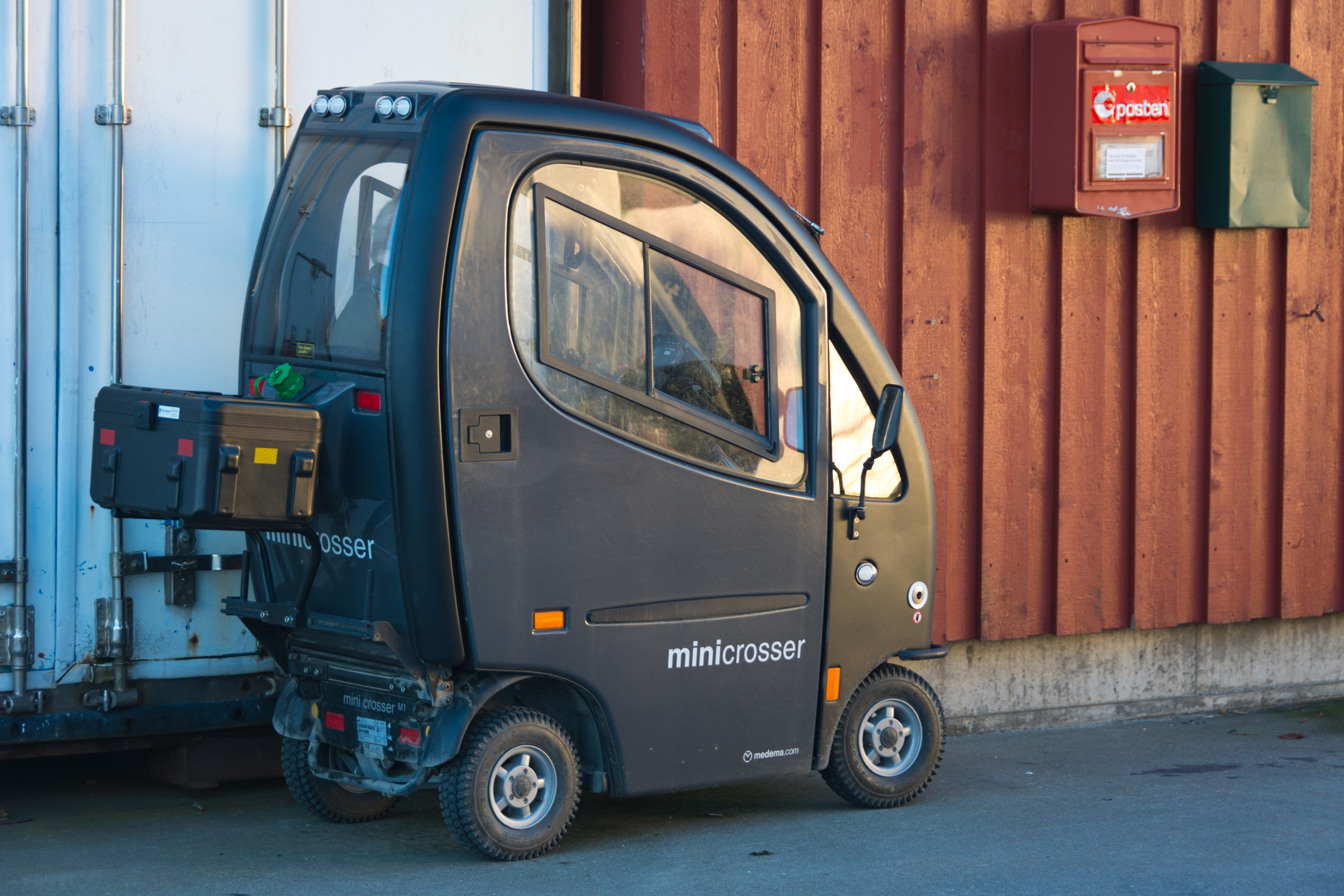
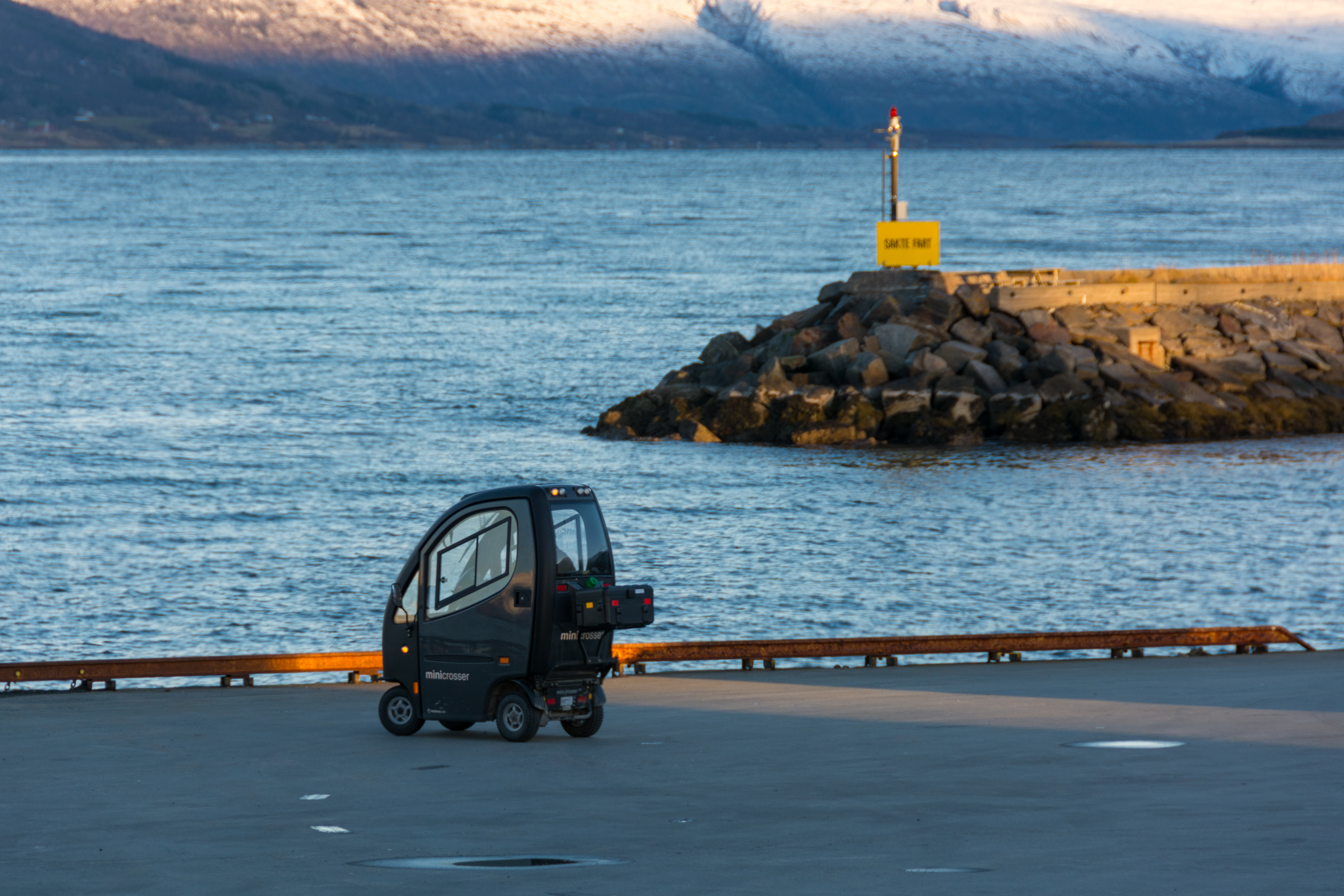
4 Wheel Mobility e-Scooter with weather cab in Norway

When it comes to Mobility Scooters they are typically categorized into the following categories:

- 3 wheel mobility scooters are lightweight and offer a great turning radius. They are designed for riders who keep on flat surfaces like a home or for shopping. These 3 wheel mobility scooters are typically the cheapest options.
- 4 wheel mobility scooters are more stable than three wheel mobility scooters and can be folding, travel, or heavy duty. Usually they are more expensive than a three-wheel mobility scooter, but offer better stability, longer battery life, and an increased weight capacity.
- Folding/travel mobility scooters fold up to provide easy transport. They are usually lightweight and compact. The do not offer a high weight capacity, nor the ability to go up steep hills, but are great for riders that are on the go.
- Heavy-duty mobility scooter These scooters are large and offer a much more comfortable ride. They better handle uneven ground (i.e. normal pavements) and journeys where dropped curbs are in short supply (i.e. most places). They can go up steep hills, off-road and have a battery that lasts longer, allowing for longer journeys. However they cannot fit into public transport or inside most shops (apart from warehouse venues). They can support riders over 140 kg (300 pounds)

== Limitations ==
While a mobility scooter eliminates much of the manual strength problems of an unpowered wheelchair, its tiller steering mechanism still requires upright posture, shoulder and hand strength, and some upper-body mobility and strength, although the delta tiller goes some way to alleviate these constraints. The arm-rest mounted controller typical of powerchair designs may be more suitable for many users. Scooters also have fewer options for body support, such as head or leg rests. They are rarely designed for ease of patient transfer from seat to bed.

Other drawbacks include longer length, which limits their turning radius and ability to use some lifts or wheelchair-designed access technologies such as kneeling bus lifts. The longer length may also make it difficult to reach door-opener buttons or doorknobs. Some mobility scooters have low ground clearance which can make it difficult to navigate certain obstacles, such as travelling in cities without proper curb cuts (aka dropped curbs). Navigating in restricted spaces, whether in the home or in public spaces and buildings, can also be a problem.

While new public buildings are usually designed with accessibility features, at least in North America, the longer length and wider turning radius may make it difficult to use them. This is a greater problem in older buildings which may have had to make compromises in retrofitting accessibility aids. For example, an elevator or lift may be adequate for a wheelchair, but too short for a mobility scooter. Hallways may be too narrow to make a right-angle turn. Or the "privacy" wall in most washrooms may restrict the entry so that the scooter cannot maneuver around it. However mobility scooters do not have the patient transfer capability to be used inside washrooms anyway.

The weight minimum and limitations may be cause for concern as well with the minimum weight requirement being 77 kg (170 pounds) and the maximum being between 110 and 180 kg (250 and 400 pounds) depending on the make.

These limitations may prevent some disabled individuals from using scooters. In addition, scooter limitations may vary depending on model and manufacturer. A limitation of one make/model does not necessarily carry over to all. Individual needs may affect the suitability of a particular model. In general, four-wheel scooters have a larger turning radius than three-wheel scooters. In particular, a purchaser should compare length, width, turning radius and ground clearance to ensure the scooter will fit with most commonly encountered obstacles in the user's environment.

Currently in the United States, Medicare will not approve a power wheelchair for persons who do not need to use the chair "inside their own home", even if their medical needs restrict the use of a mobility scooter. For example, a person with severe arthritis of both shoulders and hands may not be the best candidate for a scooter, but because they can walk a few steps in their own home, such persons are not seen as approved candidates for a power wheelchair either. Various disability rights groups are campaigning for Medicare to change this policy. For those who do qualify for Medicare, they can reimburse up to 80% of the Medicare allowable value of the scooter.

Such restrictions are also applied in at least some Canadian provinces. For example, to be eligible for partial funding by the Ontario Assistive Devices Program, the user must need the scooter for use in their own home. Scooters are too big to be used inside the average home.

Similar restrictions on NHS powerchair provision exist in the UK; manual wheelchairs are only prescribed for users who cannot walk any distance at all. They are not available to people who can shuffle or walk a little way- even if that ability is limited to just a few painful steps. This means leaves people who become disabled with no way go to out of the house; no way to buy food; no way to live. Patients must go through an extended disability assessment process of around 8 months to find out if they are judged to be deserving of a powerchair or scooter through Personal Independence Payment. This route is also not available to people over 65.

It is claimed that some users who might be better served by a powerchair are privately procuring a mobility scooter as a cheaper substitute. However mobility scooters do not fit inside a house and so cannot be a substitute there. Outside of the house most powerchairs do not do well over uneven ground. They can however operate in smooth-paved cities.

== Legal issues ==
In the UK, mobility scooters are available with government subsidy under the Motability scheme; but only to under 65s judged as having 'high mobility needs' during the PIP (Personal Independence Payment) assessment. For legal purposes, they are classified by the Use of Invalid Carriages on Highways Regulations 1988 as either Class II or Class III Invalid Carriages. A Class II scooter must be limited to 4 mph (6.4 km/h) for use on a footway only, while a Class III scooter must be limited to 8 mph (13 km/h) for road/highway use and have an additional 4 mph (6.4 km/h) limiter for footway use. To be road safe in both UK and EU due to difference in maximum legal speed (8 mph/13 km/h for UK and 26 km/h/16 mph for EU), some electric mobility scooters come with speed limiter switch. However, while users of EU countries can register a vehicle that can travel 26 km/h (16 mph) in their own country, users of UK mobility scooters will not be able to do so, if the vehicle in any way can reach more than 8 mph (13 km/h) speed, as stated by DVLA requirements regarding mobility scooters. As of March 2010 a government consultation is underway to determine how the law should adapt to increasing scooter use, whether higher road speeds should be allowed, and on a replacement for the archaic term "invalid carriage". Due to concerns over safety issues and problems with bringing prosecutions against irresponsible users under existing laws, the consultation will also consider whether to make third-party insurance mandatory, introduce compulsory training for users, and discuss how to bring scooter users under wider road traffic legislation.

Because electric mobility scooters fall under the medical aid category, when purchasing such a vehicle, people with disability or long-term illness might be eligible for VAT Relief. In addition, HMRC states that any spare parts and servicing for goods purchased on VAT relief should also be sold without VAT. However parts which could be used for taxable purposes (such as batteries) are not VAT-free. (Note: Parts and Accessories: "VAT relief does not apply to general use items such as batteries even if they're being bought for use in equipment that was bought VAT-free.")

A class 2 invalid carriage does not require registration. Class 3 invalid carriages may not be driven by a person under 14 years; they need to be registered with the DVLA and are subject to vehicle excise duty ("car tax"), though the rate is zero.

Disability Essex told the Committee about four deaths resulting from mobility scooter accidents in one year in Essex alone. Still, there is little evidence to suggest that fatalities on this scale are replicated nationwide.

In Canada, mobility scooter users are classified as pedestrians and thus may legally use sidewalks for travel. This classification is based on wheel diameter. However, a mobility scooter weighs approximately 70 to 80 kg (150 to 180 pounds) without the driver and can cause serious injury or death. Users must take care while driving around pedestrians on sidewalks. There is growing concern, and even hostility, about the use of mobility scooters in crowded urban areas tied to a growing hostility towards disabled people more generally.

An Australian Senate inquiry into mobility scooters was announced in 2017, after politician John Williams' wife Nancy was injured by one.

== Road rules ==
In some regions, only people with a reasonable need can use mobility scooters (e.g., any condition that makes walking hard for them).

While using mobility scooters, users may be expected to follow certain rules, such as:

- Do not cross the road on roundabouts.
- Do not drive mobility scooter over 10 km/h.
- Do not stay on the road longer than needed.
- Obey all the traffic rules that apply to pedestrians.
- Cross the road through the shortest, safest route possible.
- Do not use a mobility scooter under the influence of any substance.
- Users should review both state-level laws and local ordinances whenever possible.

== See also ==
- All-terrain wheelchair
- Amigo Mobility
- Golf cart
- Invalid carriage
- Lift chair
- Motor scooter
- Motorized shopping cart
- Motorized wheelchair
- Segway PT
- Wheelchair power add-on
- Wheelchair ramp
