= All-terrain wheelchair =

Wheelchair that can go off-road

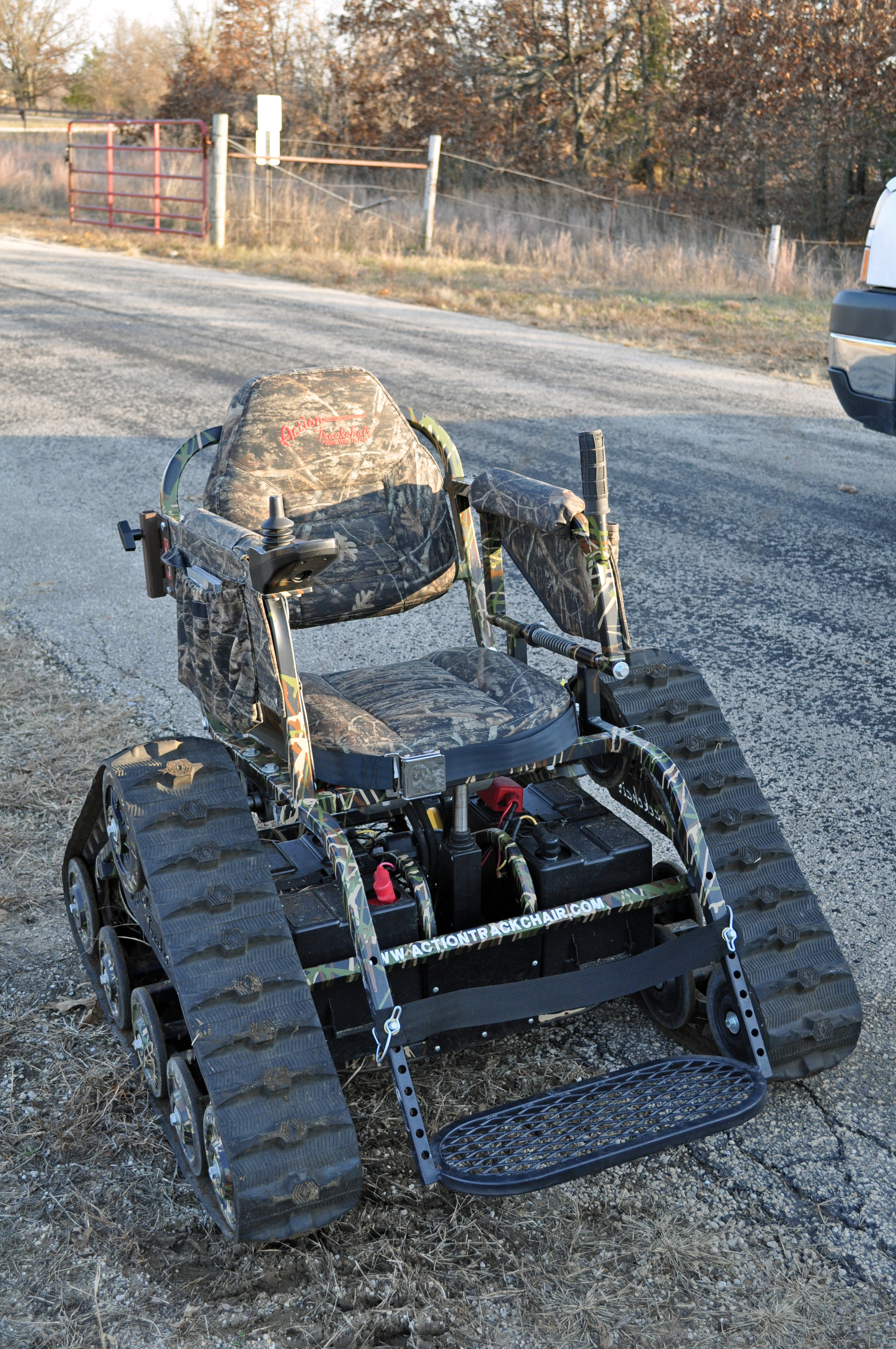
An all-terrain wheelchair with treads

An all-terrain wheelchair is designed for use on uneven surfaces that typical electric wheelchairs cannot easily handle. They enable wheelchair users to have more accessible transportation. All-terrain wheelchairs cost thousands of dollars and are too expensive for most households to afford. They are sometimes donated to specific individuals, such as a child in England, and another in Canada. Several parks have bought them to increase their accessibility to the public.

== Parks and beaches ==
Redwood Park in New Brunswick, Canada, has two of these wheelchairs available for use in their parks. In 2022, the Georgia Department of Natural Resources spent $200,000 to buy several of these wheelchairs for their state parks. Similar purchases have been made by state agencies in Colorado, Michigan, South Dakota, Connecticut, Virginia, Arkansas, Delaware, and New Jersey. Lido Beach bought a specialized model meant to traverse sand that was funded by parking fines. Lexington, a city in Kentucky, launched a program to provide its residents with the wheelchairs.

== Sports ==
In 2024, an all-terrain wheelchair was designed by the British Columbia Institute of Technology for use in the Cybathlon. Chris Kerr climbed Mount Kilimanjaro using an all-terrain wheelchair.

== Examples ==
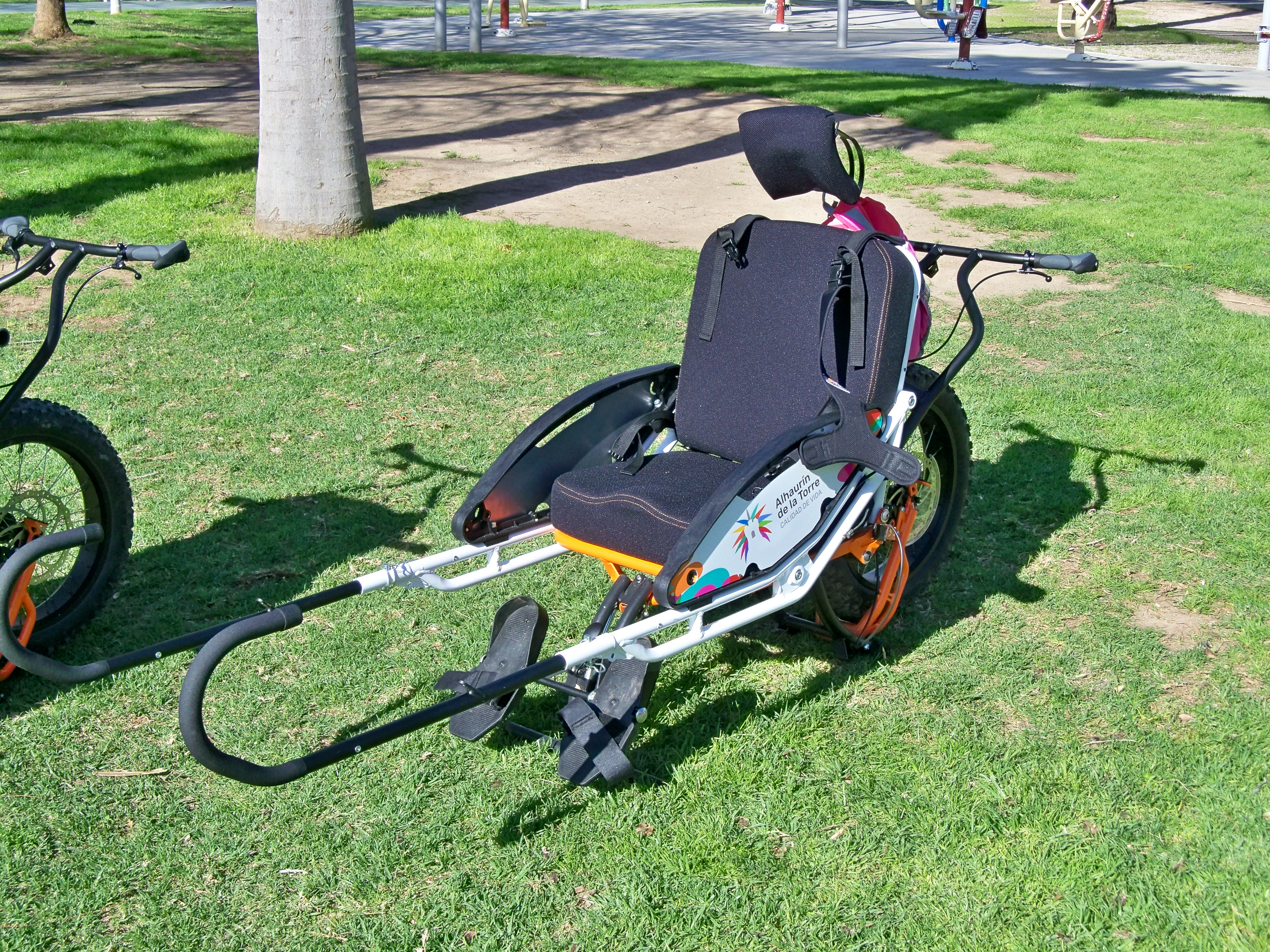
A Joëlette chair. More mobile than a regular wheelchair but requires assistants front and back to aim and push the chair. Common at wilderness parks both for disabled guests and for medevac of injured guests.

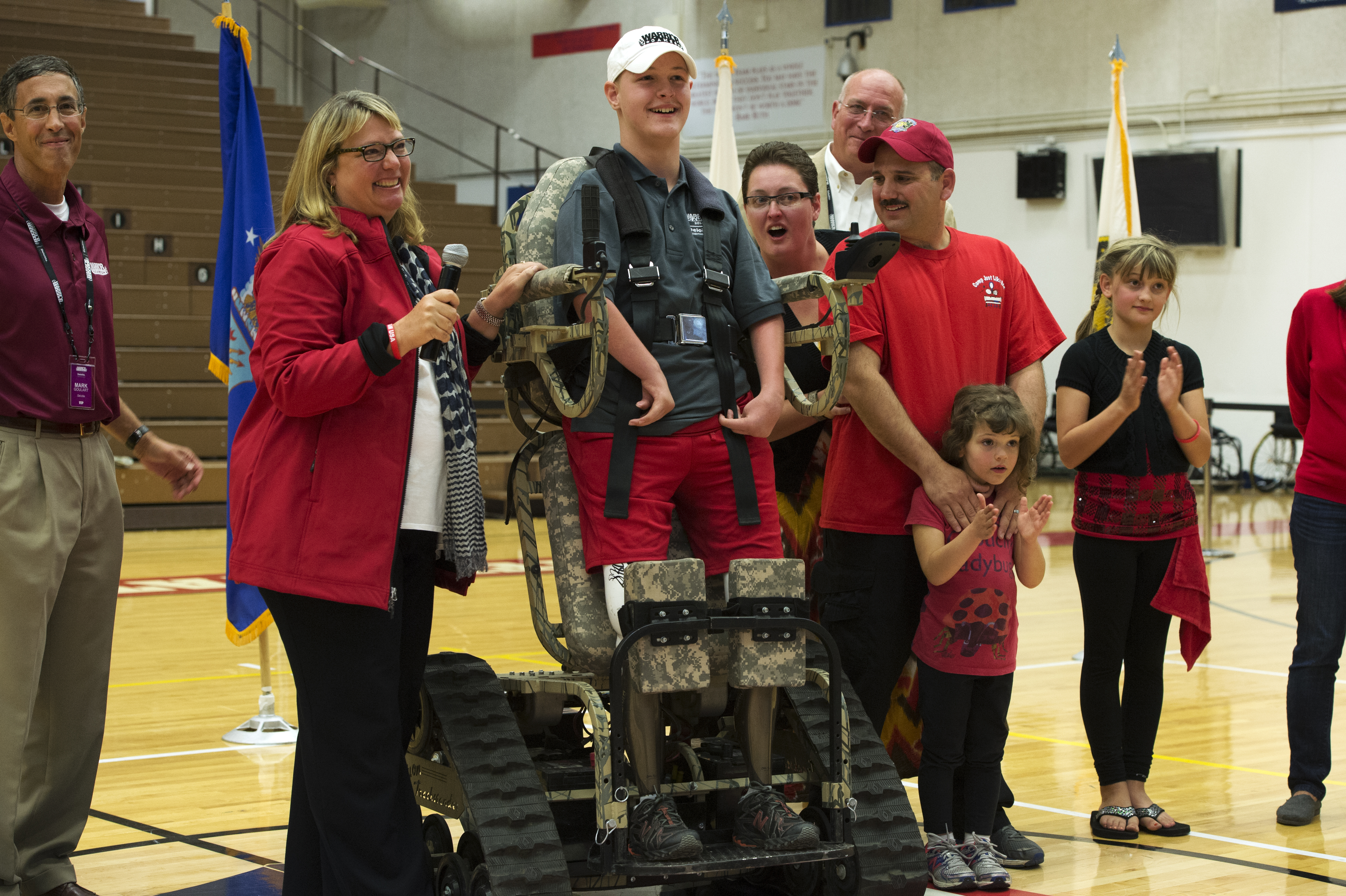
An "Action Track Chair" is gifted to Stetson Bardfield. This model allows sitting and standing without the use of legs.

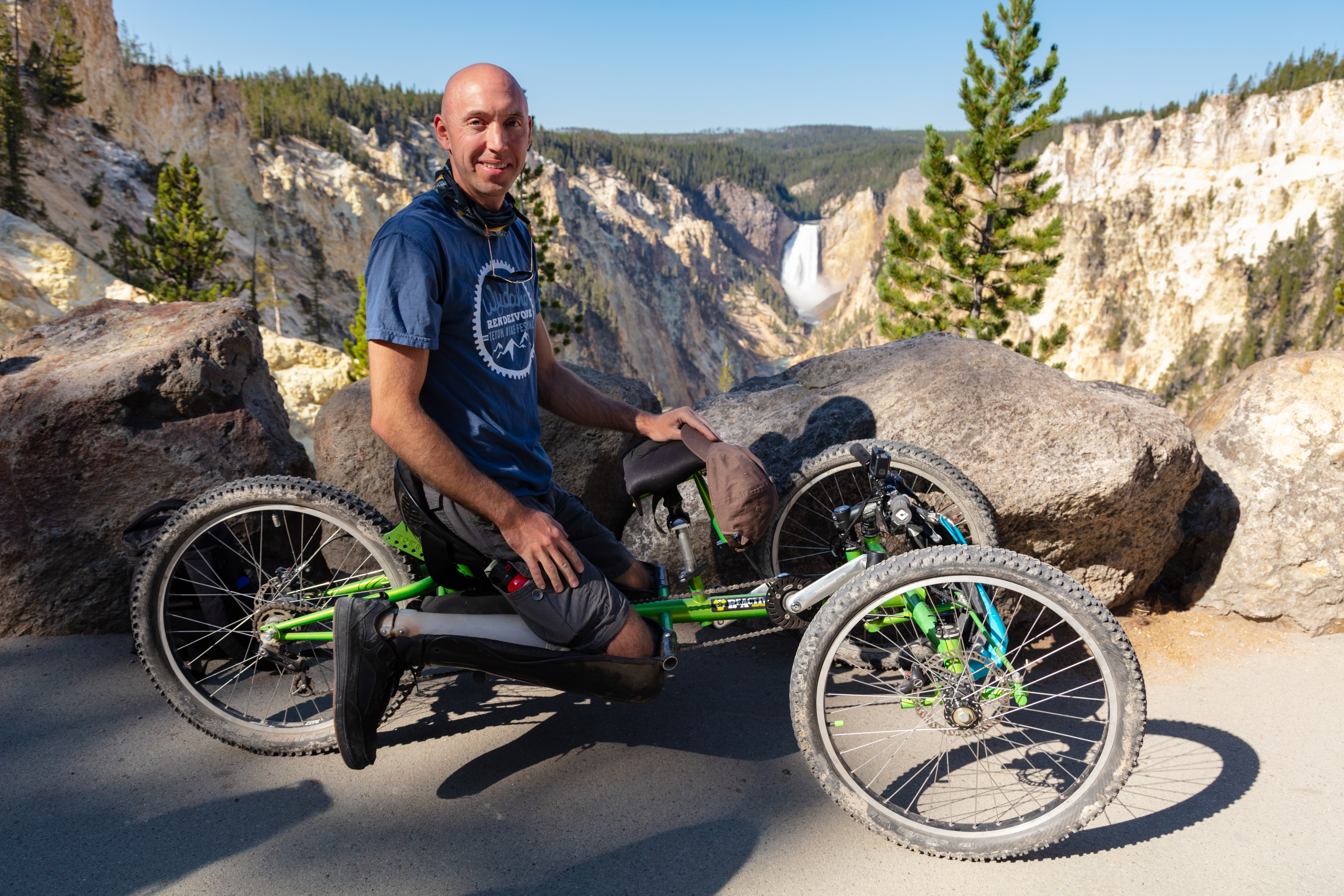
An off-road tricycle wheelchair built using mountain bike components. Some come equipped with batteries and ebike motors to allow extra mobility options.

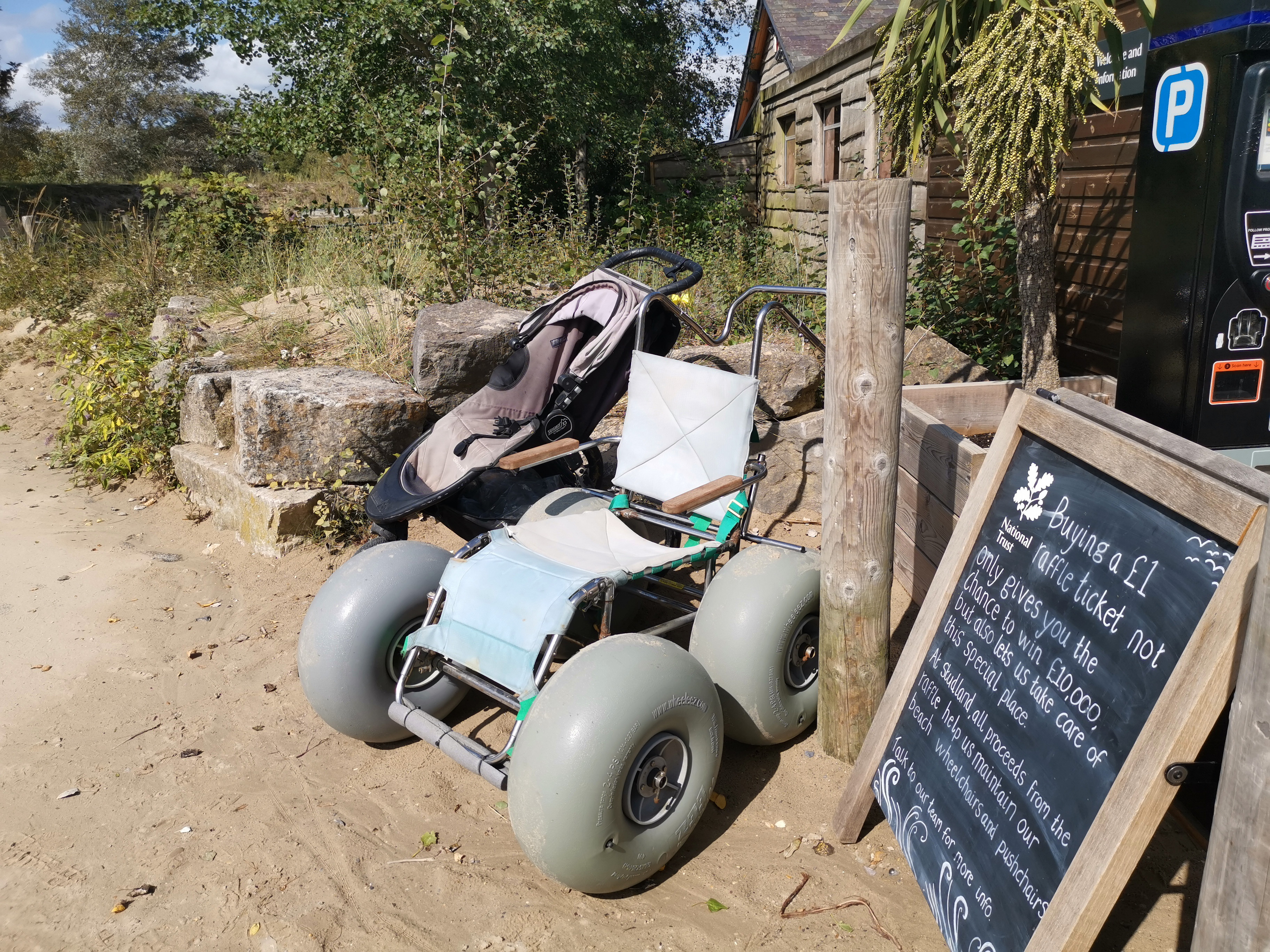
A beach wheelchair with large soft very low pressure tires designed to handle sand, driftwood, and even tidepools. The buoyant wheels allow some excursion into the water.

== See also ==
- Mobility aid
- Mobility scooter
- Recumbent bike (and recumbent trike)
- Quadracycle
