= Bergamasco =

Bergamasco may refer to:

== People ==
- Bergamasco (surname), list of people with the surname

== Places ==
- the region around the city of Bergamo, in the Italian region of Lombardy
- Bergamasco, Piedmont, a comune (municipality) in the province of Alessandria in the Italian region of Piedmont
- Caprino Bergamasco, a commune in the province of Bergamo in the Italian region of Lombardy
- Cisano Bergamasco, a commune in the province of Bergamo in the Italian region of Lombardy

== Other ==
- Bergamasco Shepherd Dog, a breed of dog with origins near Bergamo, Italy

== See also ==
- Bergamasque (disambiguation)
- Bergamo (disambiguation)
