= Outline of free software =

Overview of and topical guide to free software

The following outline is provided as an overview of and topical guide to free software and the free software movement:

Free software – software which can be run, studied, examined, modified, and redistributed freely (without any cost). This type of software, which was given its name in 1983, has also come to be known as "open-source software", "software libre", "FOSS", and "FLOSS". The term "Free" refers to it being unfettered, rather than being free of charge.

== Large free software projects ==
- GNU Project
- Linux
- Berkeley Software Distribution

== Free software by type ==
Free and open-source software packages (by type)

- Comparison of free off-line GPS software
- Comparison of free software for audio
- Free television software
- Free web application software

== Free software products ==
- List of free software project directories
- List of formerly proprietary software
- List of Linux distributions
  - List of Ubuntu-based distributions
- List of open source software packages
  - Comparison of open source wireless drivers
  - List of open source statistical packages
  - List of trademarked open source software
- List of free and open-source Android applications
- List of free and open-source software packages
- List of free software web applications

=== Operating system families ===
- Comparison of open-source operating systems
- AROS
- BSD
- Darwin
- eCos
- FreeDOS
- GNU
- Haiku
- Inferno
- Linux
- Mach
- MINIX
- OpenSolaris
- Plan 9
- ReactOS

=== Open-source software development products ===
- Eclipse
- F#
- Free Pascal
- FreeBASIC
- Gambas
- GCC
- Java
- LLVM
- Lua
- NetBeans
- Open64
- Perl
- PHP
- Python
- ROSE
- Ruby
- Tcl
- TypeScript

== Free software movement ==
- Alternative terms for free software
- Debian Social Contract
- Free-software licence
- Gratis versus Libre
- Open source
  - Open-source definition
  - Open-source software
  - Open-source-software movement
  - Comparison of open source and closed source
  - Comparison of open-source software hosting facilities
- Open standard
- Long-term support
- Software Package Data Exchange

=== Challenges ===
- Proprietary software
- Proprietary device driver ("binary blobs")
- Free and open-source graphics device driver
- Proprietary firmware
- Secure boot
- Digital rights management
- License proliferation
- Software patents and free software
- SCO–Linux controversies
- Mozilla software rebranded by Debian
- Open-source software security
- Trusted Computing

=== Free software licenses ===
==== Specific licenses ====
- Apache
- Artistic
- Beerware
- Boost Software License
- BSD licenses
- CC0
- GNU General Public License
- GNU Lesser General Public License
- ISC license
- MIT License
- Mozilla Public License
- Ms-PL/RL
- WTFPL
- zlib License

==== License types and standards ====
- Comparison of free and open-source software licenses
- Contributor License Agreement
- Copyleft
- Debian Free Software Guidelines
- Definition of Free Cultural Works
- Free license
- The Free Software Definition
- The Open Source Definition
- Open-source license
- Permissive free software licence
- Public domain
- Viral license

=== History of the free software movement ===
- Free Software Foundation
- SCO–Linux disputes
- Open Source Initiative
- History of GNU
- History of Haiku
- History of Linux
- History of the Linux kernel
- Mozilla
  - History of Mozilla Application Suite
  - History of Firefox
  - History of Mozilla Thunderbird
- Timeline of free and open-source software

=== Events ===
- List of free-software events

=== Organizations ===
- .NET Foundation
- Android Open Source Project
- Apache Software Foundation
- Blender Foundation
- The Document Foundation
- Eclipse Foundation
- F Sharp Software Foundation
- Free Software Foundation
  - Free Software Foundation Europe
  - Free Software Foundation of India
  - Free Software Foundation Latin America
- FreeBSD Foundation
- freedesktop.org
- Free Software Movement of India
- GNOME Foundation
- GNU Project
- Google Code
- KDE e.V.
- Linux Foundation
- Mozilla Foundation
- Open Knowledge Foundation
- Open Source Geospatial Foundation
- Open Source Initiative
- Outercurve Foundation
- Software Freedom Conservancy
- SourceForge
- Symbian Foundation
- X.Org Foundation
- Xiph.Org Foundation
- XMPP Standards Foundation

=== Persons influential in the free software movement ===
==== Well known scholars ====
- Lawrence Lessig
- John Gilmore
- Eben Moglen
- Eric S. Raymond

==== Other leading personalities ====
- Rick Adams
- Eric Allman
- Brian Behlendorf
- Keith Bostic
- Alan Cox
- Miguel de Icaza
- Theo de Raadt
- Jim Gettys
- Jon Hall
- Jordan Hubbard
- Lynne Jolitz
- William Jolitz
- Rasmus Lerdorf
- Marshall Kirk McKusick
- Bram Moolenaar
- Ian Murdock
- Tim O'Reilly
- Keith Packard
- Brian Paul
- Bruce Perens
- Bob Scheifler
- Mark Shuttleworth
- Richard Stallman
- Linus Torvalds
- Andrew Tridgell
- Guido van Rossum
- Larry Wall

== See also ==
- Comparison of free and open-source software licenses
- List of free and open-source software packages
- Category
- Commons
- Portal
