= Bergamot =

Bergamot may refer to:

== Plants ==
- Bergamot orange
- Bergamot essential oil
- Monarda, genus of herbaceous plants of similar odor to the bergamot orange; in particular
  - Monarda didyma, called bergamot, scarlet beebalm, scarlet monarda, Oswego tea, or crimson beebalm
  - Monarda fistulosa, called wild bergamot or bee balm
- Eau de Cologne mint, also called bergamot mint
- (in France) Citrus limetta, called sweet lime or sweet lemon in English

== Other ==
- HMS Bergamot, two ships of the Royal Navy of the United Kingdom
- Bergamot (arts center), an art gallery facility in Santa Monica, California, United States
  - 26th Street/Bergamot station, a station on the light-rail Expo Line, adjacent to the art gallery
- Project Bergamot, joint project between several European universities and Mozilla for the development of machine translation software

== See also ==
- Bergamo (disambiguation)
