= Bergamo (disambiguation) =

Bergamo is a city in Northern Italy.

Bergamo may also refer to:

== Places in Italy ==
- Province of Bergamo, a province of Northern Italy
- The Republic of Bergamo, a short-lived French client republic in 1797
- The Diocese of Bergamo, founded in the 4th century

== People ==
- Alexander of Bergamo (†c.303), Roman soldier and patron saint of Bergamo
- Viator of Bergamo (died 370), second bishop of Bergam
- Andreas of Bergamo, late-ninth-century Italian historian
- Bonagratia of Bergamo (c. 1265 – 1340), Franciscan lawyer
- Venturino of Bergamo (1304–1346), Italian preacher
- Gasparinus de Bergamo (c. 1360 – c. 1431), Italian grammarian
- Peter of Bergamo (died 1482), Italian theologian
- Paolo Bergamo (born 1943), Italian former football referee.
- Giacomo da Bergamo (1434–1520), Augustinian friar
- Padre Davide da Bergamo (1791–1863), Italian Augustinian friar and composer

== Other uses ==
- Bergamo (surname)
- Bergamo (shopping mall), a shopping mall in Chennai, India
- The 15 Infantry Division Bergamo, an Infantry Division of the Italian Army during World War II
- The University of Bergamo
- The Bergamo railway station
- Atalanta Bergamo, the Bergamo football club
- The Bergamo Lions, an Italian American football team
- Epyc Bergamo, codename for a series of server CPUs from AMD
- Volley Bergamo, the volleyball team of Bergamo

== See also ==
- Bergama, a Turkish city and district
- Bergamot (disambiguation)
