= Firefox version history =

Firefox market share overview
According to StatCounter data October 2026
Browser	% of Fx	% of total
Firefox 115 and 115 ESR	4.69%	0.12%
Firefox 120	2.73%	0.07%
Firefox 121	5.47%	0.14%
Firefox 123	1.17%	0.03%
Firefox 124	1.95%	0.05%
Firefox 125	0.78%	0.02%
Firefox 128–139	1.17%	0.03%
Firefox 140–152	7.42%	0.19%
Firefox 153 and 153 ESR	1.56%	0.04%
Firefox 154	0.78%	0.02%
Firefox 155	1.17%	0.03%
Firefox 156	4.30%	0.11%
Firefox 157	27.73%	0.71%
Firefox 158	27.34%	0.70%
Firefox 159	4.69%	0.12%
All variants	100%	2.56%

Firefox was created by Dave Hyatt and Blake Ross as an experimental branch of the Mozilla Application Suite, first released as Firefox 1.0 on November 9, 2004. Starting with version 5.0, a rapid release cycle was put into effect, resulting in a new major version release every six weeks. This was gradually accelerated further in late 2019, so that new major releases occur on four-week cycles starting in 2020.

== Early versions ==
The project that became Firefox today began as an experimental branch of the Mozilla Suite called m/b (or mozilla/browser). Firefox retains the cross-platform nature of the original Mozilla browser, using the XUL user interface markup language. The use of XUL made it possible to extend the browser's capabilities through the use of extensions and themes. The development and installation processes of these add-ons raised security concerns, and with the release of Firefox 0.9, the Mozilla Foundation opened a Mozilla Update website containing "approved" themes and extensions. The use of XUL sets Firefox apart from other browsers, including other projects based on Mozilla's Gecko layout engine and most other browsers, which use interfaces native to their respective platforms (Galeon and Epiphany use GTK+, K-Meleon uses MFC, and Camino uses Cocoa). Many of these projects started before Firefox, and may have served as inspiration.

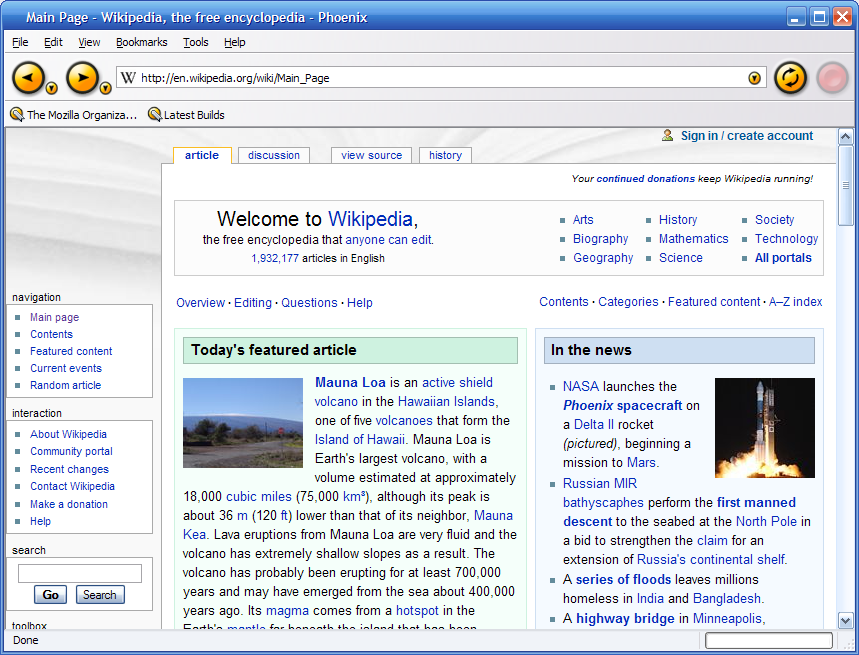
Phoenix 0.1, the first official release

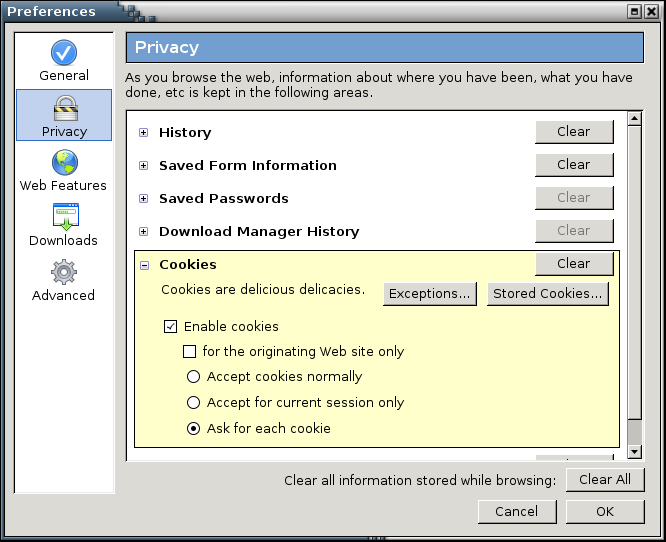
Early humorous description of what cookies are in the Preferences window of Mozilla Firefox 0.9.3. This description was soon dropped in later versions.

Hyatt, Ross, Hewitt and Chanial developed their browser to combat the perceived software bloat of the Mozilla Suite (codenamed, internally referred to, and continued by the community as SeaMonkey), which integrated features such as IRC, mail, news, and WYSIWYG HTML editing into one internet suite. After it was sufficiently developed, binaries for public testing appeared in September 2002 under the name Phoenix. This name carried the implication of the mythical firebird that rose triumphantly from the ashes of its dead predecessor, in this case Netscape Navigator which lost the "First browser war" to Microsoft's Internet Explorer. The name Mozilla began as the internal codename for the original 1994 Netscape Navigator browser aiming to displace NCSA Mosaic as the world's most popular web browser. The name for this would-be "Mosaic killer" was meant to evoke the building-crushing Godzilla.

Due to continuing pressure from the Firebird community, on February 9, 2004, the project was renamed again to Mozilla Firefox. The name "Firefox" (a reference to the red panda) was chosen for its similarity to "Firebird", and its uniqueness in the computing industry. To ensure that no further name changes would be necessary, the Mozilla Foundation began the process of registering Firefox as a trademark with the United States Patent and Trademark Office in December 2003. This trademark process led to a delay of several months in the release of Firefox 0.8 when the foundation discovered that Firefox had already been registered as a trademark in the UK for Charlton Company software.

=== Firefox 1.0 ===
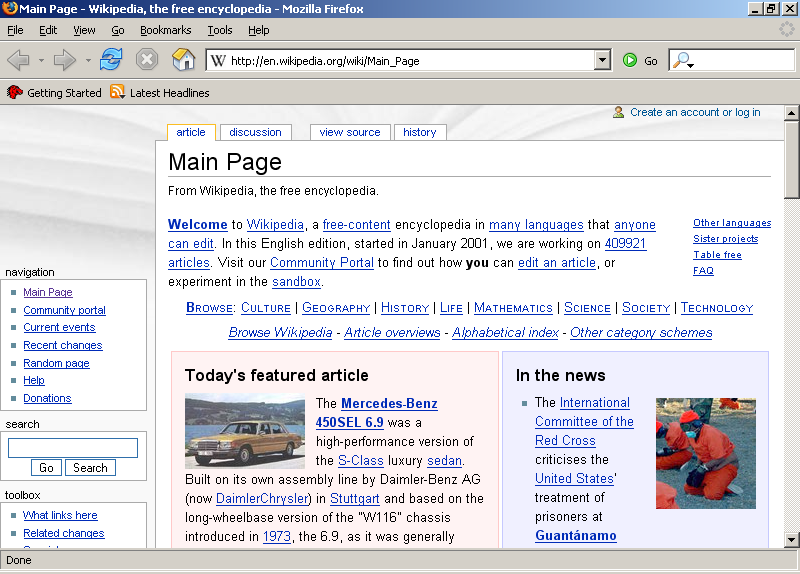
Firefox 1.0, the first release targeted for the general public

Firefox version 1.0 was released on November 9, 2004. The launch of version 1.0 was accompanied by "a respectable amount of pre-launch fervor" including a fan-organized campaign to run a full-page ad in The New York Times.

Although the Mozilla Foundation had intended to make the Mozilla Suite obsolete and replace it with Firefox, the Foundation continued to maintain the suite until April 12, 2006 because it had many corporate users and was bundled with other software. The Mozilla community (as opposed to the Foundation) continues to release new versions of the suite, using the product name SeaMonkey to avoid confusion with the original Mozilla Suite.

=== Firefox 1.5 ===
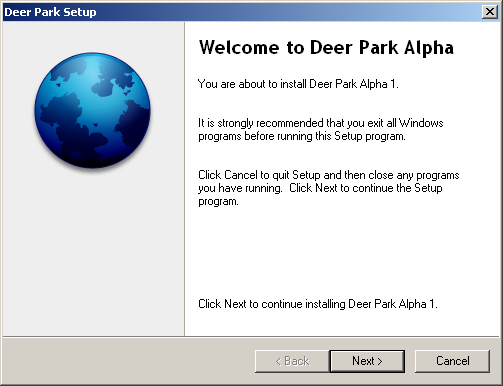
"Deer Park", the codename of the Firefox 1.1 and 1.5 Alphas, did not include Firefox branding.

Firefox 1.5 was released on November 30, 2005. Originally, it was planned to have a version 1.1 at an earlier date as the new Firefox version after 1.0, with development on a later version (1.5) in a separate development branch, but during 2005 both branches and their feature sets were merged (the Mozilla Foundation abandoned the 1.1 release plan after the first two alpha builds), resulting in an official release date between the original dates planned for both versions.

Version 1.5 implemented a new Mac-like options interface, the subject of much criticism from Microsoft Windows and Linux users, with a "Sanitize" action to allow someone to clear their privacy-related information without manually clicking the "Clear All" button. In Firefox 1.5, a user could clear all privacy-related settings simply by exiting the browser or using a keyboard shortcut, depending on their settings. Moreover, the software update system was improved (with binary patches now possible). There were also improvements in the extension management system, with a number of new developer features. In addition, Firefox 1.5 had preliminary SVG 1.1 support.

Behind the screens, the new version resynchronized the code base of the release builds (as opposed to nightly builds) with the core "trunk", which contained additional features not available in 1.0, as it branched from the trunk around the 0.9 release. As such, there was a backlog of bug fixes between 0.9 and the release of 1.0, which were made available in 1.5.

There were also changes in operating system support. As announced on June 23, 2005, by the Mozilla Foundation, Firefox 1.1, which later became 1.5, and other new Mozilla products have no longer supported Mac OS X v10.1, in order to improve the quality of Firefox releases on Mac OS X v10.2 and above. Firefox 1.5 is the final version to support Windows 95.

Alpha builds of Firefox 1.5 (id est, 1.1a1 and 1.1a2) did not carry Firefox branding; they were labelled "Deer Park" (which was Firefox 1.5's internal codename) and contained a different program icon. This was done to dissuade end-users from downloading preview versions, which are intended for developers only.

=== Firefox 2 ===
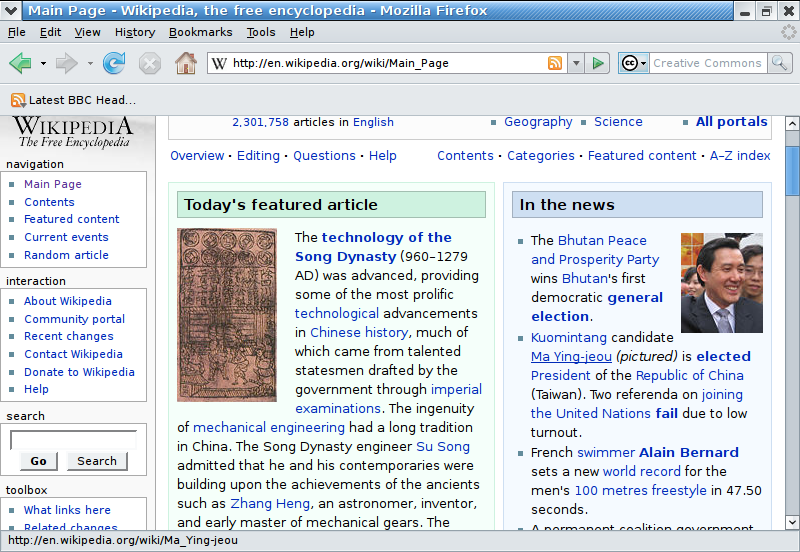
Mozilla Firefox 2.0.0.12 running on Ubuntu

On October 24, 2006, Mozilla released Firefox 2 (code named "Bon Echo" during development). This version included updates to the tabbed browsing environment, the extensions manager, the GUI (graphical user interface), and the find, search and software update engines. It also implemented a new session restore feature, inline spell checking, and an anti-phishing feature which was implemented by Google as an extension and later merged into the program itself. In December 2007, Firefox Live Chat was launched. It allowed users to ask volunteers questions through a system powered by Jive Software, with guaranteed hours of operation and the possibility of help after hours.

Firefox 2.0.0.20 was the final version that could run under an unmodified installation of Windows NT 4.0, Windows 98, and Windows Me. Subsequently, Mozilla Corporation announced it would not develop new versions of Firefox 2 after the 2.0.0.20 release, but continued Firefox 2 development as long as other programs, such as Thunderbird mail client, depended on it. The final internal release was 2.0.0.22, released in late April 2009.

Firefox 2.0 featured updates to tabbed browsing environment, the extensions manager, the GUI, and the find, search, and software update engines; a new session restore feature; inline spell checking; and an anti-phishing feature which was implemented by Google as an extension, and later merged into the program itself. As one article noted after the release of Firefox 2.0 in October 2006, "IE6 had the lion's share of the browser market with 77.22%. Internet Explorer 7 had climbed to 3.18%, while Firefox 2.0 was at 0.69%." "With support cut at the end of June, Firefox 1.5 dropped to just 2.85%."

Mozilla ended support for Firefox 2 on December 18, 2008. With roughly 26 months of support, only Firefox 3.6 was supported longer. The Gecko 1.8.1 browser core continued to receive patches for projects such as Camino, K-Meleon, and SeaMonkey, even after official Firefox releases had ceased. By 2011, the 1.8.1 core had become obsolete, as major websites dropped support for it by employing newer technologies for presentation and complex scripting. The latter can be resource-intensive with the older core, and users stuck with it should use NoScript to avoid problems with scripts that take too long to process (at the cost of losing some or all site features beyond basic functionality).

=== Firefox 3 ===
Windows Vista and Windows 7 "Strata" visual style.

Windows 2000 and Windows XP "Strata" visual style.

Mac OS X "Firelight" visual style.

"Tango" visual style for Linux and Unix-like operating systems in Ubuntu. (Icons changed based on applied GTK+ 2 theme.)

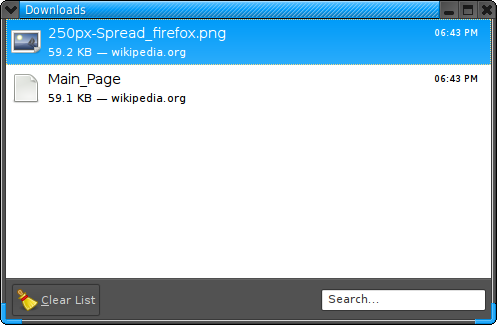
New Firefox 3 Download Manager in Ubuntu Studio.

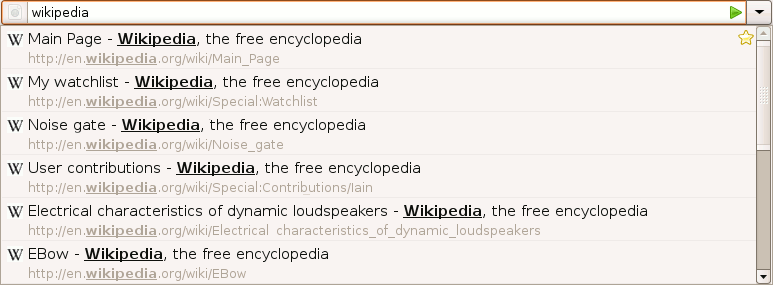
New location bar auto-complete feature in Firefox 3.

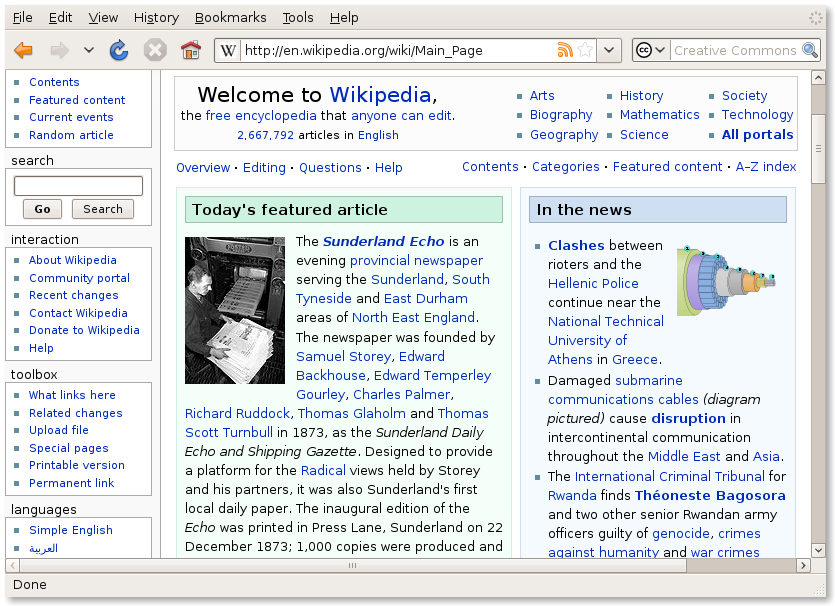
Mozilla Firefox 3.0 on Ubuntu

Firefox 3 was released on June 17, 2008, by the Mozilla Corporation. Firefox 3 uses version 1.9 of the Mozilla Gecko layout engine for displaying web pages. This version fixes many bugs, improves standard compliance, and implements new web APIs. Other new features include a redesigned download manager, a new "Places" system for storing bookmarks and history, and separate themes for different operating systems. While the new functionality of the location bar, dubbed the "Awesomebar", was overall well-received, there were those who did not like it due to user interface and performance changes, so much that extensions were made to revert it. Firefox 3 received CNET Editors' Choice in June 2008.

Firefox 3.0 was developed under the codename Gran Paradiso. This, like other Firefox codenames, is the name of an actual place; in this case the seventh-highest mountain in the Graian Alps where they first came up with the idea. Planning began in October 2006, when the development team asked users to submit feature requests that they wished to be included in Firefox 3. This was followed by several more beta releases in spring 2008 culminating in the June release. Nightly builds from the development trunk were available under the "Minefield" codename.

World map of all downloads of Mozilla Firefox 3 from June 17, 2008, to July 2, 2008

Firefox 3 had more than 8 million unique downloads the day it was released, setting a Guinness World Record. The large number of users attempting to access the Mozilla website on June 17 caused it to become unavailable for at least a few hours, and attempts at upgrading to the new version resulted in server timeouts. The site was not updated for the download of Firefox 3 until 12:00 PDT (19:00 UTC), two hours later than originally scheduled. Gareth Deaves, Records Manager for Guinness World Records, complimented Mozilla, saying, "Mobilizing over 8 million internet users within 24 hours is an extremely impressive accomplishment and we would like to congratulate the Mozilla community for their hard work and dedication."

By July 2008, it held over 5.6% of the recorded usage share of web browsers. Estimates of Firefox 3.0's global market share as of February 2010 were generally in the range of 4–5%, and then dropped as users migrated to Firefox 3.5 and later Firefox 3.6. Partially as a result of this, between mid-December 2009 and the end of January 2010, Firefox 3.5 was the most popular browser (when counting individual browser versions), passing Internet Explorer 7. Mozilla ended support for Firefox 3 on March 30, 2010, with the release of 3.0.19.

=== Firefox 3.5 ===
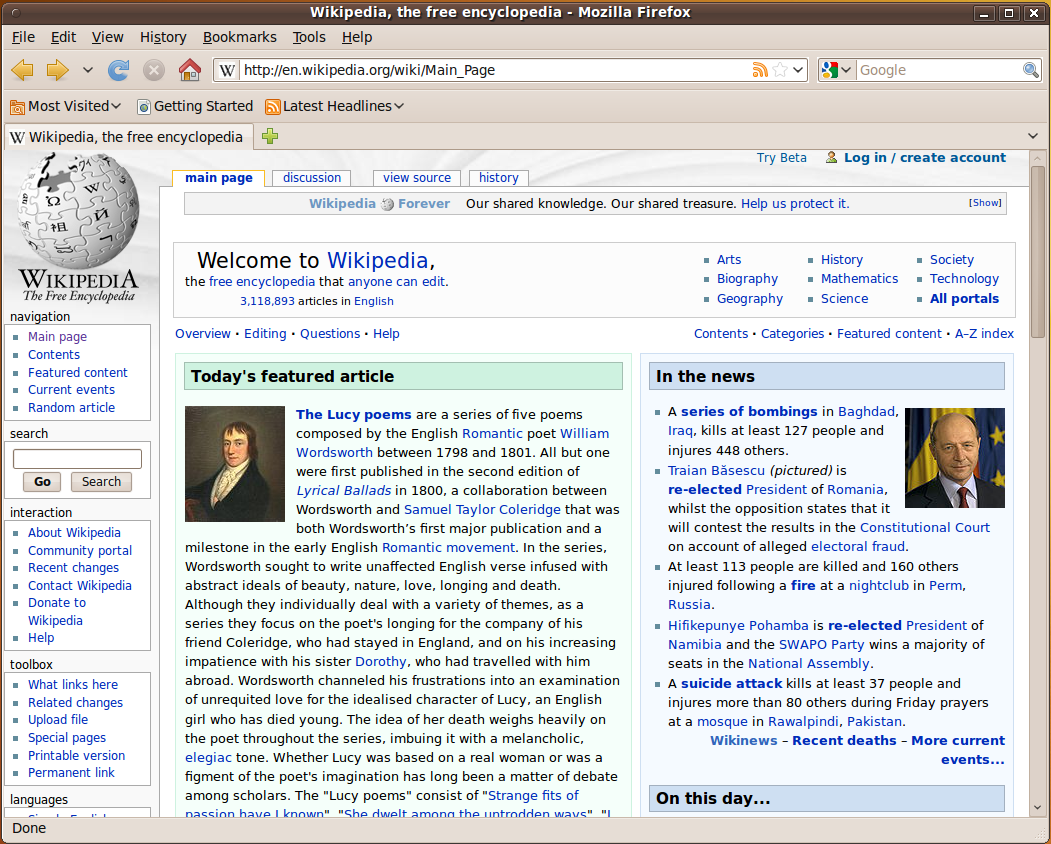
Firefox 3.5 on Ubuntu

Firefox 3.5 was released on June 30th, 2009. Firefox 3.5 added the Gecko 1.9.1 engine, support for the <video> and <audio> elements defined in the HTML 5 draft specification, a private browsing mode, native support for JSON and web worker threads, multi-touch support, and an updated logo from the previous releases. The default search engine in Russian language builds was changed to Yandex rather than Google, after a survey of Russian Firefox users indicated they preferred Yandex.

Even before the release of Firefox 3.0 on June 17, 2008, Firefox 3.1 was in development under the codename "Shiretoko". It was planned to include new interface features such as tab previews, tag auto-completion, HTML 5 <video> tag support, and CSS text shadows. The first Alpha was released on July 28, 2008 and on October 14, 2008, the first beta of Firefox 3.1 was released. It included a new TraceMonkey JavaScript engine, which is not enabled by default, and the implementation of the W3C Geolocation API.

Estimates of Firefox 3.5's global market share in February 2010 were around 15–20% and rose rapidly in July 2009 as users migrated from Firefox 3.0. From January 2010 it began to decline as users migrated to Firefox 3.6. Between mid-December 2009 and February 2010, Firefox 3.5 was the most popular browser (when counting individual browser versions) according to StatCounter, and as of February 2010 was one of the top 3 browser versions according to Net Applications.

=== Firefox 3.6 ===
Firefox 3.6 was released in January 2010. The release's main improvement over Firefox 3.5 is improved performance (due to further speed improvements in the TraceMonkey JavaScript engine). It uses the Gecko 1.9.2 engine (compared to 1.9.1 in Fx 3.5), which improves compliance with web standards. It was codenamed Namoroka. In this version, support for X BitMap images was dropped. This release marked the beginning of a new development cycle for Firefox. As well as receiving major updates, the browser also received minor updates with new features. This was to allow users to receive new features more quickly and the dawn of a new roadmap that reflected these changes.

Development for this version started on December 1, 2008. The first alpha of version 3.6 was released on August 7, 2009. The first beta version was released on October 30, followed by Beta 2 on November 10, Beta 3 on November 17, Beta 4 on November 26, and Beta 5 on December 17. Release Candidate 1 was released on January 8, 2010, followed by Release Candidate 2 on January 17. The final version was released on January 21, 2010. Firefox versions 4 through 9 had all reached end-of-life status when Mozilla discontinued support for Firefox 3.6 on April 24, 2012. Automatic update to Firefox 12 pushed out to compatible devices by June 2012.

The Firefox developers created a new feature called Lorentz. It is named after the Lorentz National Park. A preview version of Lorentz, Firefox 3.6.3plugin1, was made available on April 8, 2010. Betas of Firefox 3.6.4 were made available starting on April 20, 2010. Firefox 3.6.4 was released on June 22, 2010. The Windows and Linux versions incorporate out-of-process plug-ins (OOPP), which isolates execution of plug-ins (Adobe Flash, Apple QuickTime and Microsoft Silverlight by default) into a separate process. This significantly reduces the number of Firefox crashes experienced by users who are watching online videos or playing games; the user can simply refresh the page to continue. Mozilla states that 30% of browser crashes are caused by third-party plugins.

=== Firefox 4 ===
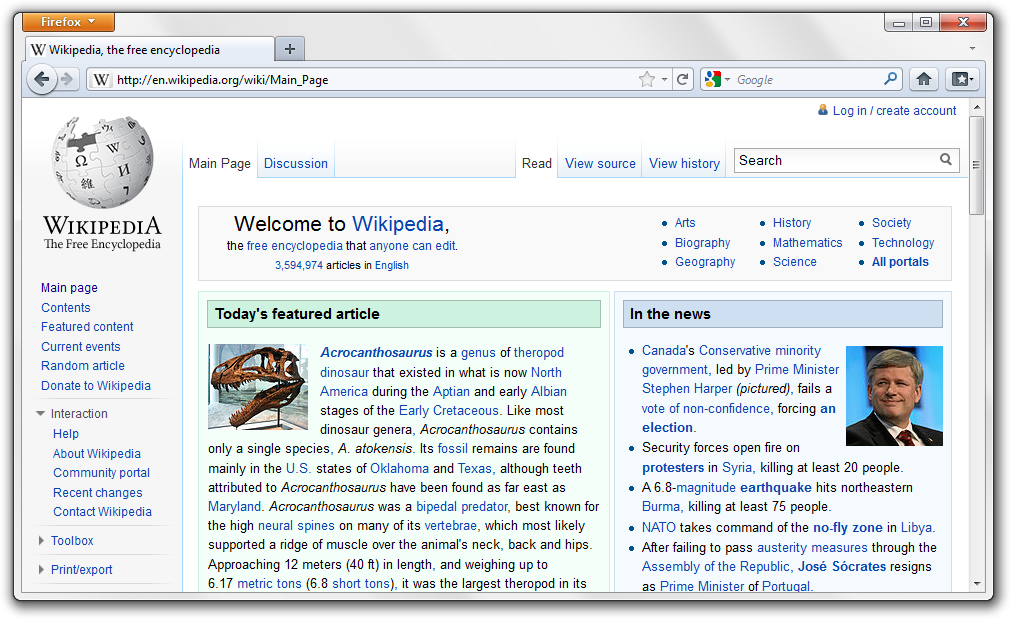
Firefox 4.0 displaying Wikipedia on Windows 7

Firefox 4 was released on March 22, 2011. It brought a new user interface, with a new look designed to make it faster. Early mockups of the new interface on Windows, Mac OS X, and Linux were first made available in July 2009. It was also based on the Gecko 2.0 engine, which added or improved support for HTML5, CSS3, WebM, and WebGL.

Other features were tab groups, improved notifications, "switch to tab" where opened tabs can be searched through the address bar, application tabs, a redesigned add-on manager, integration with Firefox Sync, and support for multi-touch displays. It also added support for the "do not track" header, an emerging standard for Web privacy. The header signals the user's request to the web service that any web visitor tracking service be disabled. In the future, this privacy request may become a legal requirement.

On October 13, 2006, Brendan Eich, Mozilla's then-Chief-Technology-Officer, wrote about the plans for "Mozilla 2", referring to the most comprehensive iteration (since its creation) of the overall platform on which Firefox and other Mozilla products run. Most of the objectives were gradually incorporated into Firefox through versions 3.0, 3.5, and 3.6. The largest changes, however, were planned for Firefox 4.

The first beta was made available on July 6, 2010; Release Candidate 2 (a base for the final version) was released on March 18, 2011. It was codenamed Tumucumaque, and was Firefox's last large release cycle. The Mozilla team planned smaller and quicker releases following other browser vendors.On March 22, 2011, and during the 24-hour launch period, Firefox 4 received 7.1 million downloads, as counted and verified by the Mozilla Foundation. Before that date, 3 million people downloaded the second release candidate of the browser, which later became the final version. As a result, the new version of the browser received 10 million downloads on the first day. Notwithstanding, it fell behind the previous record established by the launch of Firefox 3 in 2008, which was 8 million. Second-day downloads for the browser were reported to be 8.75 million, but the lack of an official representative from Guinness to monitor the numbers, made the record attained by Firefox 3 only unofficially been broken.

There was one security update in April 2011 (4.0.1) and version 4 of the browser was made obsolete by the release of Firefox 5 in June 2011.

Firefox 4 represents a departure in user interface layout and behaviour from previous versions. Users face some issues negotiating these changes, some of which are not documented in the release notes. This new feature, called on-demand session restore, overwrites the previous session on exit without prompting. The user can check whether there is a saved session at any time by viewing the History menu item "Restore Previous Session". If it is available (not greyed out) there is a restorable session available. In beta 7 introduced new config option to limit the number of tabs loaded at once during session restore. This also made possible to lazy load tabs, the preferences option to switch this behavior appeared in version 8.

== Rapid releases ==
In March 2011, Mozilla presented plans to switch to a faster 16-week development cycle, similar to Google Chrome. Ars Technica noted that this new cycle entailed "significant technical and operational challenges" for Mozilla (notably preserving third-party add-on compatibility), but that it would help accelerate Firefox's adoption of new web standards, feature, and performance improvements. This plan was implemented in April 2011. The release process was split into four "channels", with major releases trickling down to the next channel every six to eight weeks. For example, the nightly channel would feature a preliminary unstable version of Firefox 6, which would move to the experimental "Aurora" channel after preliminary testing, then to the more stable "beta" channel, before finally reaching the public release channel, with each stage taking around six weeks. For corporations, Mozilla introduced an Extended Support Release (ESR) channel, with new versions released every 30 weeks (and supported for 12 more weeks after a new ESR version is released), though Mozilla warned that it would be less secure than the release channel, since security patches would only be backported for high-impact vulnerabilities.

In 2017, Mozilla abandoned the Aurora channel, which saw low uptake, and rebased Firefox Developer Edition onto the beta channel. Mozilla uses A/B testing and a staged rollout mechanism for the release channel, where updates are first presented to a small fraction of users, with Mozilla monitoring its telemetry for increased crashes or other issues before the update is made available to all users. In 2020, Firefox moved to a four-week release cycle, to catch up with Chrome in support for new web features. Chrome switched to a four-week cycle a year later.

Starting September 2026 Firefox moved from 4 week release cadence to 2 week release cadence.

=== Firefox 5 through 9 ===
Firefox 5 was released on June 21, 2011, three months after the major release of Firefox 4. Firefox 5 is the first release in Mozilla's new rapid release plan, matching Google Chrome's rapid release schedule and rapid version number increments. Firefox 5 has significantly improved the speed of web-related tasks, such as loading pages with combo boxes or MathML. Mozilla also integrated the HTML video WebM standard into the browser, allowing playback of WebM videos.

Firefox 6 was released on August 16, 2011, introducing a permissions manager, new address bar highlighting (the domain name is black while the rest of the URL is gray), streamlining the look of the site identity block, a quicker startup time, a ScratchPad JavaScript compiler, and many other new features. This update also brought the infamous feature that caused JavaScript entered in the address bar to not run.

Firefox 7 was released on September 27, 2011, and uses as much as 50% less RAM than Firefox 4 as a result of the MemShrink project to reduce Firefox memory usage. Firefox 7.0.1 was released a few days later to fix a rare, but serious, issue with add-ons not being detected by the browser. Some URLs are trimmed in the address bar, so the "http://" scheme no longer appears, but "https://" is still displayed. Trailing slashes on domains are also hidden, for example: https://www.example.org/ becomes https://www.example.org.

Firefox 8 was released on November 8, 2011 and prompts users about any previously installed add-ons. Upon installation, a dialog box prompted users to enable or disable the add-ons. Add-ons installed by third-party programs were disabled by default, but user-installed add-ons were enabled by default. Mozilla judged that third-party-installed add-ons were problematic, taking away user control, lagging behind on compatibility and security updates, slowing down Firefox startup and page loading time, and cluttering the interface with unused toolbars. Added option in preferences to lazy load session tabs (prior to that it could be switched by config setting since version 4.0 beta 7).

Firefox 9 was released on December 20, 2011, includes various new features such as Type Inference, which boosts JavaScript performance up to 30%, improved theme integration for Mac OS X Lion, added two-finger swipe navigation for Mac OS X Lion, added support for querying Do Not Track status via JavaScript, added support for font-stretch, improved support for text-overflow, improved standards support for HTML5, MathML, and CSS, and fixed several security problems. It also features a large list of bug fixes.

=== Firefox 10 through 16 ===
Firefox 10 and Firefox ESR 10 were released on January 31, 2012. Firefox 10 added a full screen API and improved WebGL performance, support for CSS 3D Transforms and for anti-aliasing in the WebGL standard for hardware-accelerated 3D graphics. These WebGL updates mean that more complex site and Web app animations can render smoothly in Firefox, and that developers can animate 2D objects into 3D without plug-ins. It also introduced a new CSS Style Inspector, which allow users to check out a site's structure and edit the CSS without leaving the browser. Firefox 10 assumed all add-ons made for at least Firefox 4 were compatible. The add-on developer is able to alert Mozilla that the add-on is incompatible, overriding compatibility with version 10 or later. This new rule also does not apply to themes.

Firefox 10 ESR is the first Extended Support Release (ESR) as previously on January 10, 2012, where the Mozilla Foundation announced the availability of an ESR version of Firefox. Firefox ESR is intended for groups who deploy and maintain the desktop environment in large organizations such as universities and other schools, county or city governments and businesses. During the extended cycle, no new features will be added to a Firefox ESR, only high-risk/high-impact security vulnerabilities or major stability issues will be corrected.

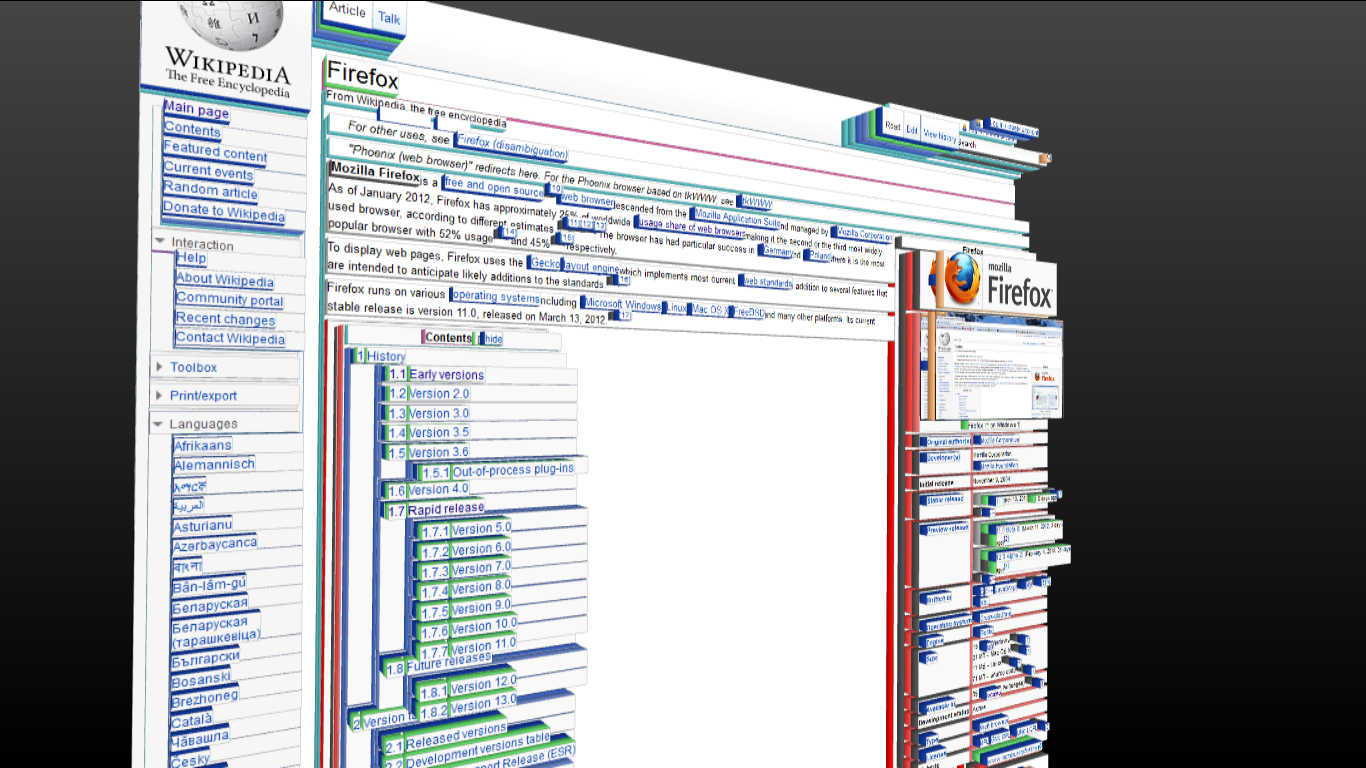
3D page inspector, a feature of versions 11 to 46.

Firefox 11 was released on March 13, 2012. Firefox 11 introduced many new features, including migration of bookmarks and history from Google Chrome, SPDY integrated services, Page Inspector Tilt (3D View), Add-on Sync, redesigned HTML5 video controls, and the Style Editor (CSS). The update also fixed many bugs, and improved developer tools.

Firefox 12 was released on April 24, 2012. Firefox 12 introduced few new features, but it made many changes and laid the ground work for future releases. Firefox 12 for Windows added the Mozilla Maintenance Service which can update Firefox to a newer version without a UAC prompt. It also added line numbers in the "Page Source" and centered find in page results. There were 89 improvements to Web Console, Scratchpad, Style Editor, Page Inspector, Style Inspector, HTML view and Page Inspector 3D view (Tilt). Many bugs were fixed, as well as many other minor under-the-hood changes. Firefox 12 is the final release to support Windows 2000 and Windows XP RTM & SP1.

Firefox 13 was released on June 5, 2012. Starting with this version, Windows support was exclusively for Windows XP SP2/SP3, Windows Vista, and Windows 7. Firefox 13 adds and updates several features, such as an updated new tab and home tab page. The updated new tab page is a feature similar to the Speed Dial already present in Opera, Google Chrome, Apple Safari, and Internet Explorer. The new tab page will display nine of the user's most visited websites, along with a cached image. In addition to the updated new tab and home tab page, Mozilla has added a user profile cleaner/reset, reduced hang times, and implemented tabs on demand. The user profile cleaner/reset provides a way for users to fix Firefox errors and glitches that may occur. Mozilla's tabs on demand restores tabs that were open in the previous session, but will keep the tabs unloaded until the user requests to view the page.

Firefox 14 was released on June 26, 2012, for mobile devices only, just outside the regular release schedule of the web browser. To sync the version numbers of the desktop and mobile versions of Firefox, Mozilla decided to release version 14.0.1 for both mobile and desktop on July 17, 2012, instead of Firefox 14 version 14.0 for the desktop and version 14.0.1 for mobile devices.

Firefox 14 introduces a new hang detector (similar to how Mozilla currently collects other data) that allows Mozilla to collect, analyze, and identify the cause of the browser freezing/hanging. Mozilla uses this information to improve the responsiveness of Firefox for future releases. In addition to tackling freezing and not-responding errors that occur because of Firefox, Mozilla implemented opt-in activation for plugins such as Flash and Java. Mozilla wants to reduce potential problems that could arise through the unwanted use of third-party applications (malware, freezing, etc.).

Firefox 15 was released on August 28, 2012, with a "Responsive Design View" developer tool, adds support for the Opus audio format, and adds preliminary native PDF support (disabled by default).

Firefox 15 introduced silent updates, an automatic update that will update Firefox to the latest version without notifying the user, a feature that the web browsers Google Chrome and Internet Explorer 8 and above have already implemented, although the user was able to disable that function. The startup time in Firefox 15 was improved for Windows users.

Firefox 16 was released on October 9, 2012, fixing outstanding bugs of the new features in Mac OS X Lion. There were improvements made to startup speed when a user wants to restore a previous session. Support for viewing PDF files inline was added in placement of a plugin. Support for web apps was added. Opus audio format is now enabled by default.

The roll-out of Firefox 16 revision 16.0.0 was stopped on October 10, 2012, after Mozilla detected a security flaw and recommended downgrading to 15.0.1 until the issue could be fixed. The security flaw was fixed in version 16.0.1, which was released the following day, October 11, 2012.

=== Firefox 17 through 23 ===
Logo used from Firefox 23 to Firefox 56

Firefox 17 and Firefox ESR 17 were released on November 20, 2012. It was not planned to bring as many user-facing features as previous releases, it brings improved display of location bar results, improvements to the silent update mechanism for users with incompatible add-ons, and refinements to the Click-To-Play system introduced in Firefox 14. A new feature for developers, an HTML tree editor is also included. Firefox 17 is the first version of the browser that uses SpiderMonkey 17. Starting with the release, Mac OS X support was offered exclusively for Snow Leopard, Lion, and Mountain Lion.

Firefox 18 was released on January 8, 2013. A new feature for Firefox 18 is IonMonkey, Mozilla's next generation JavaScript engine, it also uses some functions of WebRTC. Firefox 19 was released on February 19, 2013, featuring a built-in PDF viewer.

Firefox 20 was released on April 2, 2013, and introduced a panel-based download manager, along with H.264 decoding on the <video> tag (on Windows only), and per-window private browsing. It also includes a new developer toolbox, that combines all developer tools into one panel.

Firefox 21 was released on May 14, 2013. The Social API now supports multiple providers, and an enhanced three-state UI for Do Not Track (DNT).

Firefox 22 was released on June 25, 2013. WebRTC is now enabled by default. Partial CSS Flexbox support was added (flex-wrap support was scheduled for Firefox 28). A new feature for Firefox 22 was OdinMonkey, Mozilla's next generation JavaScript engine.

Firefox 23 was released on August 6, 2013. It includes an updated Firefox logo, mixed content blocking enabled by default to defend against man-in-the-middle attacks, implementation of the <input type="range"> form control attribute in HTML5, dropping support for the <blink> HTML element as well as the text-decoration:blink CSS element, the restriction to have to "switch to a different search provider across the entire browser", and a global browser console, a new network monitor among other things. JavaScript is automatically enabled by the update, without regard to the previous setting, and the ability to turn it off has been removed from the interface, the "contentious" change was made because many websites depend on JavaScript and it was felt that users unaware that they had disabled JavaScript were attributing the resulting unpredictable layout to software bugs in Firefox.

=== Firefox 24 through 30 ===
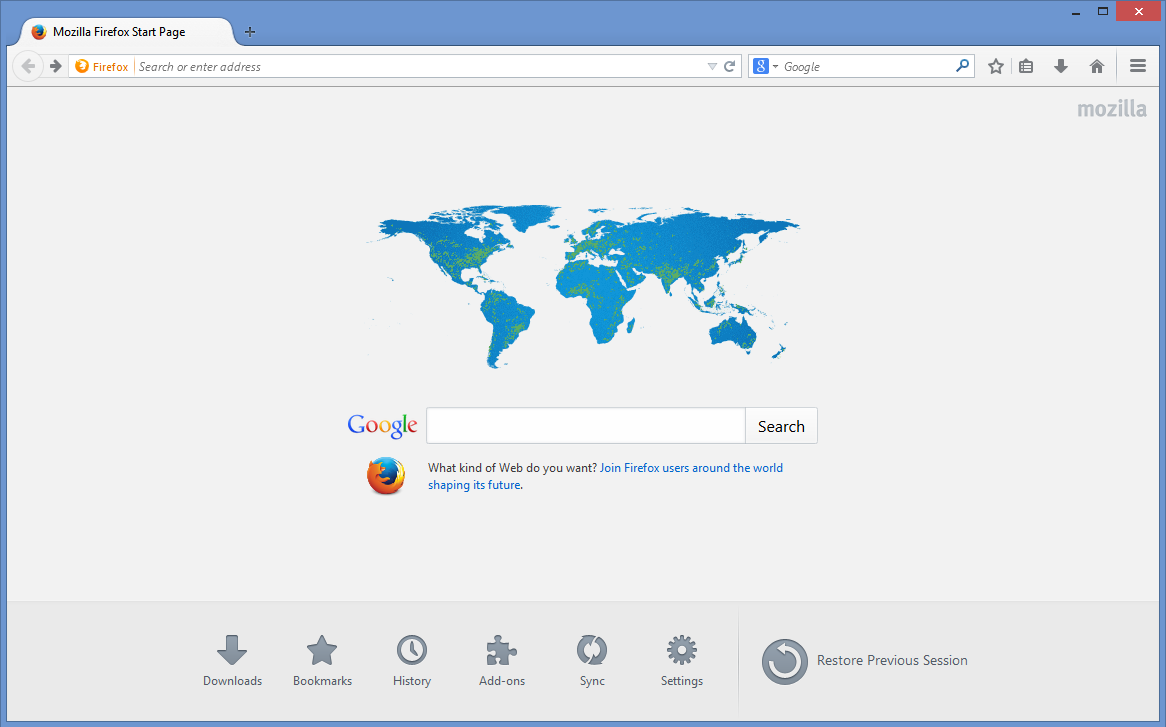
Firefox 29 with Australis interface, running on Windows 8.1

Firefox 24 and Firefox 24 ESR were released on September 17, 2013. The release includes support for the new scrollbar style in Mac OS X 10.7 (and newer), closing tabs to the right, an improved browser console for debugging, and improved SVG rendering, among other things. It is the first version of the browser that uses SpiderMonkey 24.

Firefox 25 was released on October 29, 2013. Firefox 25 Nightly was at one point slated to include the Australis theme, but Australis did not actually land on Nightly until Firefox 28, did not make it to Firefox 28 Aurora channel, and was finally available with Firefox 29. This release added support for <iframe srcdoc> attribute, background-attachment:local in CSS, along with Web audio API support, a separate find bar for each tab and many other bug fixes.

Firefox 26 was released on December 10, 2013. Firefox 26 changed the behavior of Java plugins to "click-to-play" mode instead of automatically running them. It also added support for H.264 on Linux, password manager support for script-generated fields, and the ability for Windows users without advanced write permissions to update Firefox, as well as many bug fixes and developer-related changes.

Firefox 27 was released on February 4, 2014. It adds improved Social API and SPDY 3.1 support, as well as enabling of TLS 1.1 and 1.2 by default after having been tested through a toggle in about:config since version 23 (TLS 1.1) and 24, released on September 17, 2013. Also, it brings many bug fixes, security improvements, and developer-related changes. Firefox 28 was released on March 18, 2014, and added support for VP9 video decoding and support for Opus in WebM.

Firefox 29 was released on April 29, 2014, and includes a redesigned interface codenamed Australis, it also removes the add-on bar and moves its content to the navigation bar. Additionally, it introduced automatic correction of protocol typos to the address bar, meaning that, for example, ttps:// is automatically corrected to https://. Firefox 30 was released on June 10, 2014. It adds support for GStreamer 1.0 and a new sidebar button, and most plugins are not activated by default.

=== Firefox 31 through 37 ===
Firefox 31 and Firefox 31 ESR were released on July 22, 2014. Both versions added search field on the new tab page and were improved to block malware from downloaded files, along with other new features. Firefox 31 ESR is the first ESR to include the Australis interface, unifying the user experience across different Firefox versions. Firefox 24.x.x ESR versions would be automatically updated to ESR version 31 after October 14, 2014.

Firefox 32 was released on September 2, 2014. It shows off HTTP caching improvements, adds HiDPI/Retina support in the Developer Tools UI and widens HTML5 support, among other things.

Firefox 33 was released on October 14, 2014. It now has off-main-thread compositing (OMTC) enabled by default on Windows (which brings responsiveness improvements), OpenH264 support, search suggestions on about:home and about:newtab, address bar search improvements, session restore reliability improvements, and other changes.

Firefox 33.1 was released on November 10, 2014, celebrating Firefox's 10-year anniversary.

Firefox 33.1.1 was released for desktop only on November 14, 2014, fixing a startup crash.

The logo of Firefox Hello.

Firefox 34 was released on December 1, 2014. It brings Firefox Hello (a WebRTC client for voice and video chat), an improved search bar, and the implementation of HTTP/2 (draft14) and ALPN, together with other features. It also disables SSLv3, and enables the ability to recover from a locked Firefox process and to switch themes and personas directly in the customization mode. Additionally, the default search engine for North America was changed to Yahoo, and for Belarusian, Kazakh, and Russian locales it was changed to Yandex.

Firefox 35 was released on January 13, 2015. It brings support for a room-based conversations model to the Firefox Hello chat service, and other functions, it also includes security fixes. Firefox 36 was released for desktop on February 24, 2015, bringing full HTTP/2 support and other smaller improvements and fixes.

Firefox 37 was released on March 31, 2015, bringing a heartbeat user rating system, which provides user feedback about the Firefox, and improved protection against website impersonation via OneCRL centralized certificate revocation. Also, Bing search is changed to use HTTPS for secure searching, and added is support for opportunistic encryption of the HTTP traffic where the server supports HTTP/2's AltSvc feature.

=== Firefox 38 through 44 ===
Both Firefox 38 and Firefox 38 ESR were released on May 12, 2015, with new tab-based preferences, Ruby annotation support and availability of WebSockets in web workers, along with the implementation of the BroadcastChannel API and other features and security fixes.

Firefox 39 was released on July 2, 2015, disabling insecure SSLv3 and RC4, improving performance for IPv6 fallback to IPv4 and including various security fixes. Firefox 39.0.3 was released on August 6, 2015, to fix a zero-day exploit.

Firefox 40 was released on August 11, 2015. On Windows 10, the UI was revamped to reflect the overall appearance of Windows 10, this interface would allow for improved usability on touchscreens when used in the operating system's "Tablet mode". Firefox 40 includes additional security features, including the filtering of pages that offer potentially unwanted programs, and warnings during the installation of unsigned extensions, in future versions, signing of extensions will become mandatory, and the browser will refuse to install extensions that have not been signed. Firefox 40 also includes performance improvements, such as off-main-thread compositing on Linux.

Firefox 41 was released on September 22, 2015. Among many additions are the ability to set a profile picture for a Firefox account, enhanced IME support using Text Services Framework, and instant messaging on Firefox Hello.

Firefox 42 was released on November 3, 2015. Among many additions are private browsing with tracking protection, IPv6 support in WebRTC, and the ability to view a HTML source in the tab.

Firefox 43 was released on December 15, 2015. Major changes included the availability of a 64-bit version for Windows 7 and above, and a new strict blocklist.

Firefox 44 was released on January 26, 2016. The warning pages for certificate errors and untrusted connections is redesigned, support enablied for H.264 and WebM/VP9 video on systems that don't support MP4/H.264 as well as for the brotli compression format via HTTPS content-encoding on all systems. The "Ask me every time" cookies option was additionally removed without any notifications.

=== Firefox 45 through 51 ===
Firefox 45 and Firefox 45 ESR were released on March 8, 2016. Instant Browser sharing was added through Hello, the addition of Guarani locale, the ability to filter snapshot output in memory tool, and the removal of the Tab Groups (panorama) feature.

Firefox 46 was released on April 26, 2016. The JavaScript Just in Time (JIT) Compiler and GTK3 integration were improved, the latter being Linux only, alongside HKDF support for Web Crypto API.

Firefox 47 was released on June 7, 2016. Support was added for Google's Widevine CDM on Windows and Mac OS X so streaming services like Amazon Video can switch from Silverlight to encrypted HTML video alongside the VP9 video codec for users with fast machines, the ability of embedded YouTube videos to play with HTML video if Flash is not installed, and the addition of the Latgalian language.

Firefox 48 was released on August 2, 2016. Download protection was enhanced, and the Windows Remote Access Service modem Autodial was removed. It was also the first official release with "Electrolysis" (multi-process Firefox, meaning that the interface and web pages are running in separate processes in the computer) was enabled.

Firefox 49 was released on September 20, 2016. The Firefox Login Manager was revamped, support for Mac OS X Snow Leopard, Mac OS X Lion, and OS X Mountain Lion were dropped, video performance was improved for users on systems that support SSE3 without hardware acceleration, a context menu was added to HTML audio and video that let users loop files or play files at 1.25x speed, improvements in about:memory reports for tracking font memory usage, and the removal of Firefox Hello. Additionally, support for processors without SSE2 extensions such as the AMD Athlon XP and Pentium III under Windows is dropped.

Firefox 50 was released on November 15, 2016. Playback video was expanded onto more sites without plugins with WebM EME Support for Widevine on Windows and Mac, performance was improved on SDK extensions or extensions using the SDK module loader, download protection for a large number of executable file types on Windows, Mac OS, and Linux was added, and support for WebGL was added to more than 98 percent of users on Windows 7 and newer.

Firefox 51 was released on January 24, 2017. Among the many additions were added support for FLAC (Free Lossless Audio Codec) playback, better Tab Switching, support for WebGL 2, and a warning that is displayed when a login page does not have a secure connection.

=== Firefox 52 through 59 ===
Logo used from Firefox 57 to Firefox 69

Firefox 52 and Firefox 52 ESR were released on March 7, 2017. An important aspect of Firefox ESR 52.0 is that it is the first ESR version based on the Firefox Electrolysis (Firefox 48) code base. Firefox 52 added support for WebAssembly (while disabled in Firefox ESR 52), an emerging standard that brings near-native performance to Web-based games, apps, and software libraries without the use of plugins, automatic captive portal detection for easier access to Wi-Fi hotspots, and user warnings for insecure HTTP pages with logins. Firefox 52 dropped support for NPAPI plugins like Microsoft Silverlight and Java with the exception of Adobe Flash Player (except the ESR version which still supports NPAPI).

Firefox 53 was released on April 19, 2017. Starting with Firefox 53, Microsoft Windows support is exclusively for Windows 7 and above. Other major changes included improved graphics stability for Windows users with the addition of compositor process separation, the addition of light and dark "compact" themes based on the themes included with Firefox Developer Edition, the removal of support for 32-bit macOS and Linux for processors older than the Pentium 4 and Opteron processors, a new visual design for audio and video controls, support for WebM video with alpha compositing, which allows playing videos with transparent backgrounds, and support for displaying estimated reading time for pages in Reader Mode.

Firefox 54 was released on June 13, 2017. Major changes included simplifying the download button and download status panel, support for multiple content processes, the ability to create and save custom devices in responsive web design mode, and improved audio and video playback in the browser.

Firefox 55 was released on August 8, 2017. Major changes included the launch of Windows support for WebVR, options that let users optimize recent performance improvements, simplification of the installation process with a streamlined Windows stub installer, improvements to the address bar, and a redesigned printing menu in Reader Mode.

Firefox 56 was released on September 28, 2017. A redesigned layout was added the "Preferences" page, the launch of Firefox Screenshots, support for address form autofill, hardware acceleration for AES-GCM, update of the Safe Browsing protocol to version 4, improved security or verifying update downloads, and improved support for WebExtensions. Another change was the introduction of the mozlz4 format, a proprietary variant of the lz4 compression format (.mozlz4 and .jsonlz4 file extensions instead of .json.lz4 as per unix/linux standard). Session data is stored in the lz4 format instead of plain text. Firefox 56 cannot recognize the legacy plain text session files, only the lz4-encoded ones.

Firefox 57 was released on November 14, 2017, with the name Firefox Quantum. ZDNet dubbed it a "comeback" following years of falling market share against Google Chrome. The release included a new interface design, codenamed "Photon", and a new rendering engine almost twice as fast as the previous one used. One of the largest visual changes in Photon was the removal of the search box from the address bar. Firefox 57 features an updated logo, and no longer supports legacy add-ons using XUL technologies. Google also became the default search engine in the US and Canada, a departure from Yahoo, which had been the default search engine in the US and Canada since 2014.

Firefox 58 was released on January 23, 2018. With it, support for credit card autofill was added, support for user profiles was removed, a warning to alert users and site owners of planned security changes to sites affected by the gradual distrust plan for the Symantec certificate authority, full screen bookmark management with folder support, support for FLAC (Free Lossless Audio Codec) playback, and the ability to change the status bar color in themes.

Firefox 59 was released on March 13, 2018. With it, the UI was optimized and improved, Real-Time Communication (RTC) was improved, Firefox Screenshots was revamped, support was added for W3C specs for pointer events, Private Browsing Mode had path information on referrers removed to prevent cross-site tracking, the addition of Firefox as an Assist app, and newly added support for HLS (HTTP Live Streaming) playback for greater compatibility with video sites.

=== Firefox 60 through 67 ===
Firefox 60 and Firefox 60 ESR were released on May 9, 2018. It includes a policy engine that allows customized Firefox deployments in enterprise environments, using Windows Group Policy or a cross-platform JSON file, enhancements to New Tab / Firefox Home, a revamped Cookies and Site Storage section in Preferences for greater clarity and control of first- and third-party cookies, the application of Quantum CSS to render browser UI, support for Web Authentication API, which allows USB tokens for website authentication, an option for Linux users to show or hide page titles in a bar at the top of the browser, improved WebRTC audio performance and playback for Linux users, and exclusive support for extensions built using the WebExtension API (ESR).

Firefox 61 was released on June 26, 2018. Improvements were made to support the dark theme mode across the entire Firefox user interface, support was added for a future to allow WebExtensions to hide tabs, access to more search engines was added, alongside bookmark syncing performance improvements.

Firefox 62 was released on September 5, 2018. FreeBSD support was added for WebAuthn, a preference that allows users to distrust certificates issued by Symantec in advance of removing all trust for Symantec-issued certificates was added, improved graphics rendering for Windows users without accelerated hardware using Parallel-Off-Main-Thread Painting, CSS Variable Fonts (OpenType Font Variations) were introduced, support for CSS Shapes was added to allow for richer web page layouts, improved scrolling performance, and faster page load times over Wi-Fi connections by loading from the network cache if disk cache is slow. The bookmarks' Description field was deprecated and will be removed completely in future releases.

Firefox 63 was released on October 23, 2018. Performance and visual improvements for Windows and macOS users, content blocking, WebExtensions running in their own process in Linux, recognition of the operating system accessibility setting for reducing animation, the addition of Amazon and Google as Top Sites tiles on the Firefox Home (New Tab) page, and the removal of the "Never Check for Updates" option from "about:preferences" and the "Open in Sidebars" feature from the Library.

Firefox 64 version 64.0 was released on December 11, 2018. Firefox 64 for desktop provides better recommendations, enhanced tab management, easier performance management, improved performance for Mac and Linux users by enabling link time optimization (Clang LTO), more seamless sharing on Windows, the option to remove add-ons using the context menu on their toolbar buttons, TLS certificates issued by Symantec that are no longer trusted by Firefox, and the availability of WebVR on macOS.

Firefox 65 was released on January 29, 2019. Performance and web compatibility with support for the WebP image format were made, enhanced security for macOS, Linux, and Android users via stronger stack smashing protection which is now enabled by default for all platforms (both desktop and Android), enhanced tracking protection, updated language settings in Preferences, support for Handoff on macOS, a better video streaming experience for Windows users, easier performance management, an improved pop-up blocker, the availability of Firefox for Windows with 32- and 64-bit MSI installers for easier enterprise deployments, and additional support for Flexbox.

Firefox 66 was released on March 19, 2019. Websites can no longer automatically playing sound, smoother scrolling prefromance, an improved search experience and performance and better user experience for extensions, the addition of basic support for macOS Touch Bar and of support for Windows Hello on Windows 10, along with the enabling of AV1 support on 32-bit Windows and macOS.

Firefox 67 was released on May 21, 2019. Major changes included lowering priority of setTimeout during page load, suspending (unloading) unused tabs to clear memory, the ability to block known cryptominers and fingerprinters in the Custom settings of the Content Blocking preferences, improvements to keyboard accessibility, usability and security improvements in Private Browsing, and protection against running older versions of the browser which can lead to data corruption and stability issues.

=== Firefox 68 through 77 ===
Logo used since Firefox 70

Firefox 68 and Firefox 68 ESR were released on July 9, 2019. Among the many additions were: Expansion of Dark Mode in Reader view, a new reporting feature in about:addons, cryptomining and fingerprinting protections, WebRender for Windows 10, Windows Background Intelligent Transfer Service (BITS) update download support, user and enterprise added certificates read from the OS by default (68 ESR), improved web page painting performance by avoiding redundant calculations during paint, and introduction of WebAuthn (the Web Authentication API, Android).

Firefox 69 was released on September 3, 2019. Improvements were made to Tracking Protection, the Block Autoplay feature was introduced, support for the Web Authentication HmacSecret extension via Windows Hello for versions of Windows May 10, 2019, or newer was added, support for receiving multiple video codecs was added, JIT support for ARM64, and improvements for download UI, performance (Windows 10), and battery life (macOS).

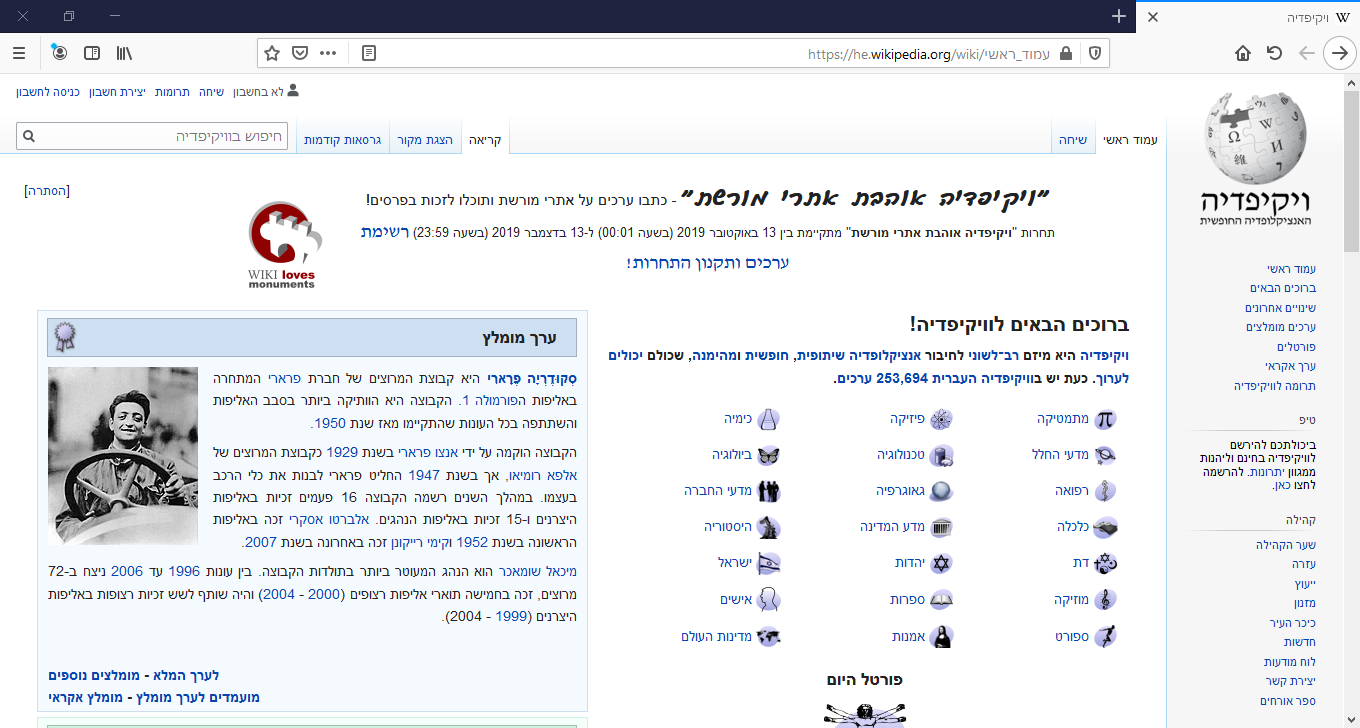
Firefox 70.0.1 running on Windows 10, displaying the main page of Hebrew Wikipedia

Firefox 70 was released on October 22, 2019. More privacy protection from Enhanced Tracking Protection and Firefox Lockwise was introduced, improvements to core engine components for better browsing on a greater number of sites, a stand-alone Firefox account menu for easy access to Firefox services like Monitor and Send, the dark mode preference for built-in Firefox pages, and inactive CSS support.

Firefox 71 was released on December 3, 2019. A revamp to the integrated password manager Lockwise was made, more information about Enhanced Tracking Protection in action was added, picture-in-picture mode was introduced for Windows, and native MP3 decoding was added on Windows, Linux, and macOS.

Firefox 72 was released on January 7, 2020. Among the additions were: the replacement of notification request pop-ups, the ETP blocking fingerprinting scripts by default, the availability of picture-in-picture video for macOS and Linux, and the removal of support for blocking images from individual domains because of low usage and poor user experience.

Firefox 73 was released on February 11, 2020. Among the additions were: a new global default zoom level setting, a "readability backplate" solution which places a block of background color between the text and background image, improved audio quality when playing back audio at a faster or slower speed, a prompt to save logins if a field in a login form was modified, and rolling out WebRender to laptops with Nvidia graphics cards with drivers newer than 432.00, and screen sizes smaller than 1920x1200.

Firefox 74 was released on March 10, 2020. Additions included: improvement of login management with the ability to reverse alpha sort (Name Z-A) in Lockwise, simple importing of bookmarks and history from Microsoft Edge on Windows and Mac, use of Add-ons Manager to remove add-ons installed by external applications, Facebook Container, which prevents Facebook from tracking across the web, and support for mDNS ICE. This release was also the first with TLS 1.0 and 1.1 disabled. However, out of concern for access to information during the COVID-19 pandemic, TLS 1.0 and 1.1 support was readded on March 31, 2020.

Firefox 75 was released on April 7, 2020. Additions included: a number of improvements with Firefox's revamped address bar, the local cache of all trusted Web PKI Certificate Authority certificates known to Mozilla, the availability of Firefox in Flatpak on Linux, and the integration of Direct Composition on Windows.

Firefox 76 was released on May 5, 2020. Additions included: strengthened protections for online account logins and passwords, with innovative approaches to managing accounts during this critical time, allowing multitasking in Picture-in-Picture, support for Audio Worklets that will allow more complex audio processing like VR and gaming on the web, and two updates to the address bar improving its usability and visibility.

Firefox 77 was released on June 2, 2020. Additions included: Pocket recommendations on Firefox' new tab for UK users, a new about:certificate page, and the removal of the browser.urlbar.oneOffSearches preference.

=== Firefox 78 through 90 ===
Firefox 78 and Firefox 78 ESR were released on June 30, 2020. Among the many additions were: the Protections Dashboard, the addition of the Refresh button to the Uninstaller, a new WebRender rolled out to Windows users with Intel GPUs, the addition of Pocket Recommendations to users in the UK, the requirement of GNU libc 2.17, libstdc++ 4.8.1 and GTK+ 3.14 or newer versions on Linux, the disabling of TLS 1.0 and 1.1 and other improvements, and the addition of Kiosk Mode, client certificates, Service Worker and Push APIs, the Block Autoplay feature, picture-in-picture support, and the management of web certificates in about:certificate in 78 ESR.

Firefox 79 was released on July 28, 2020. Among the many additions were: a new WebRender rolled out to Windows users with Intel and AMD GPUs, the addition of Pocket Recommendations to users in Germany, the fixes for several crashes while using a screen reader, and updates to the password policy, the enabling of Enhanced Tracking Protection by default, and the ability to switch to Dark Mode.

Firefox 80 was released on August 25, 2020, for desktop. Among the many additions were: the setting as the default system PDF viewer, the new add-ons blocklist enabled to improve performance and scalability, support for RTX and Transport-cc for improved call quality in poor network conditions and better bandwidth estimation and better compatibility with many websites using WebRTC.

Firefox 81 was released on September 22, 2020. Among the many additions were: the ability to pause or play audio or video right from the keyboard or headset, the introduction of the Alpenglow theme, the ability to save, manage, and auto-fill credit card information for U.S. and Canada users, the support of Acroform, which allows users to fill in, print, and save supported PDF forms, the automatic revelation of the Bookmarks toolbar, the expansion of .xml, .svg, and .webp, and fixes for browser native HTML audio/video controls.

Firefox 82 was released on October 20, 2020. Changes included various changes to improve the video watching experience, improved page load and start up performance, saving a webpage to Pocket from the Firefox toolbar, and the ability to automatically purge cookies from sites not visited in 30 days.

Firefox 83 was released on November 17, 2020. Among the many additions were: significant updates to SpiderMonkey and JavaScript engine and replacement of the part of the JavaScript engine that helps to compile and display websites for the user, the introduction of the HTTPS-Only Mode, the support of pinch zooming for users with Windows touchscreen devices and touchpads on Mac devices, support of keyboard shortcuts for fast forwarding and rewinding videos in Picture-in-Picture, improved user interface, improved functionality and design for a number of Firefox search features, support of Acroform, and newly supported add-ons: FoxyProxy, Bitwarden, AdGuard AdBlocker, Tomato Clock, LeechBlock NG, and Web Archives.

Firefox 84 was released on December 15, 2020. Among the many additions were: native support for macOS devices built with Apple silicon CPUs, the rollout of WebRender to MacOS Big Sur, Windows devices with Intel Gen 6 GPUs, and Intel laptops running Windows 7 and 8, and an accelerated rendering pipeline for Linux/GNOME/X11 users for the first time, the use of more modern techniques for allocating shared memory on Linux, improving performance and increasing compatibility with Docker, the option to view open tabs side by side in a grid view, the ability to delete downloaded files within the app, the rollout of WebRender to more users on the Mali-G GPU series.

Firefox 85 was released on January 26, 2021. Among the many additions were: protection from supercookies, a type of tracker that can stay hidden in the browser and track users online, even after they have cleared cookies, the ability to save and access bookmarks more easily, the ability of the password manager to have users remove all their saved logins with one click, as opposed to having to delete each login individually, the removal of Adobe Flash support, and added support for the :focus-visible pseudo class.

Firefox 86 was released on February 23, 2021. Among the many additions were: added support for simultaneously watching multiple videos in Picture-in-Picture, improved Print functionality with a cleaner design and better integration with the computer's printer settings, credit card management and auto-fill for users in Canada, notable performance and stability improvements achieved by moving canvas drawing and WebGL drawing to the GPU process, the removal of DTLS 1.0 support or establishing WebRTC's PeerConnections, and the introduction of Total Cookie Protection to Strict Mode (both).

Firefox 87 was released on March 23, 2021. Among the many additions and removals were: the addition of SmartBlock, which provides stand-in scripts so that websites load properly, the new default HTTP Referrer policy (both), the improved "Highlight All" feature on Find in Page, full support for macOS built-in screen reader, VoiceOver, the disabling of the Backspace key as a navigation shortcut for the back navigation button, and the removal of Synced tabs, Recent highlights, and Pocket list from the Library menu, and the rollout of WebRender to more devices, with the following mobile GPUs now supported: Adreno 505, Adreno 506, Mali-T (Android).

Firefox 88 was released on April 19, 2021. Among the many additions and removals were: PDF forms supporting JavaScript embedded in PDF files, localized margin units, smooth pinch-zooming using a touchpad on Linux, isolation of window.name data to the website that created it, the removal of the "Take a Screenshot" feature from the Page Actions menu in the url bar, the disabling of FTP support and a new toggle button in the Network panel for switching between JSON formatted HTTP response and raw data.

Firefox 89 was released on June 1, 2021. Among the many additions and removals were: core experience redesigned and modernized to be cleaner, more inviting, and easier to use, simplified browser chrome and toolbar, clear, streamlined menus, updated prompts, inspired tab design, reduced number of alerts and messages, lighter iconography, a refined color palette, and more consistent styling throughout, enhancement of privacy of Private Browsing Mode with Total Cookie Protection, the introduction of the elastic overscroll effect known from many other applications for macOS users, added support for smart zoom, native context menus on macOS, Synced Tabs in the Tabs tray, support for the Event Timing API, and support for the CSS forced-colors media query (both).

Firefox 90 was released on July 13, 2021. Among the many additions and removals were: the application of updates in the background when Firefox is not running on Windows, a new page called about:third-party to help identify compatibility issues caused by third-party applications in Windows, the management of exceptions to HTTPS-Only mode in about:preferences#privacy, working hyperlinks in "Print to PDF", Version 2 of Firefox's SmartBlock feature, the addition of software WebRender for most users without its hardware accelerated version, improved software WebRender performance, removal of FTP support, support for Private Fields in DevTools, support for Fetch Metadata Request Headers, the ability to use client authentication certificates stored in hardware tokens or in Operating System storage, the ability to save, manage, and auto-fill credit card information for users shopping on Firefox, and Back/Forward Cache (aka BFCache) for webpages that use unload event listeners (Android).

=== Firefox 91 through 101 ===
Firefox 91 and Firefox 91 ESR were released on August 10, 2021. Among the many additions and removals were: a build on Total Cookie Protection, support for logging into Microsoft, work, and school accounts using Windows single sign-on, the return of the Simplify page when printing feature, the addition of a new Scots locale, the address bar providing Switch to Tab results in Private Browsing windows, the automatic enable of High Contrast Mode when "Increase Contrast" is checked on MacOS, catch-up paints for almost all user interactions, the support of JavaScript embedded in PDF files, the addition of SmartBlock, protection from supercookies, support of AcroForm, the removal of support for Adobe Flash (ESR), a "Set Firefox as your default browser" message on notification pane for new installs, the addition of eBay Search to help users with their shopping needs, and default autoplay setting updated to Blocking Audio Only (Android).

Firefox 92 was released on September 7, 2021. Among the many additions and removals were: an automatic upgrade to HTTPS using HTTPS RR as Alt-Svc headers, support of full-range color levels for video playback on many systems, support for images containing ICC v4 profiles on macOS, access of macOS share options from the Firefox File menu, the redesign of certificate error pages for better user experience, and added support for Web Authentication API, which allows USB tokens (such as the use of USB or Bluetooth Security Key) for website authentication (Android).

Firefox 93 was released on October 5, 2021. Among the many additions and removals were: support for the new AVIF image format, which is based on the modern and royalty free AV1 video codec, support for filling more forms for PDF viewer, automatic unload of tabs based on their last access time, memory usage, and other attributes for Windows when available system memory is critically low, blocking downloads that rely on insecure connections, protecting against potentially malicious or unsafe downloads, improved web compatibility for privacy protections with SmartBlock 3.0, a new referrer tracking protection in Strict Tracking Protection and Private Browsing, disabling of TLS ciphersuites that use 3DES, the addition of forward, back, and reload buttons in the toolbar on tablets, the auto-fill of logins and passwords by default, and the merging of site security and privacy info into one icon (Android).

Firefox 94 was released on November 2, 2021. Among the many additions and removals were: a selection of six fun seasonal Colorways (available for a limited time only), the usage of Apple's low power mode for fullscreen video on sites such as YouTube and Twitch, the addition of about:unloads, fewer interruptions on Windows because of a background agent that will download and install updates even if Firefox is closed, improved WebGL performance and reduced power consumption for Linux users, the introduction of Site Isolation to better protect all users against side-channel attacks, support for the new Snap Layouts menus when running on Windows 11, reduced CPU usage during socket polling for HTTPS connections, faster storage initialization, improved cold startup by reducing main thread I/O, and the new Inactive Tabs feature (Android).

Firefox 95 was released on December 7, 2021. Among the many additions and removals were: RLBox, a new technology that hardens Firefox against potential security vulnerabilities in third-party libraries, the addition of Firefox download from the Microsoft Store on Windows 10 and 11, reduced CPU usage on macOS in Firefox and WindowServer during event processing, reduced power usage of software decoded video on macOS, especially in fullscreen, the ability to move the Picture-in-Picture toggle button to the opposite side of the video, the enabling of Site Isolation, a User Agent override for Slack.com, which allows Firefox users to use more Call features and have access to Huddles, the new "Homepage" section in the Settings Menu, Hero Images in the "Jump Back In" section, confirmation of snack bar "Auto-close enabled" when a user enables auto-close from the tab tray, and support of Pocket (Thought Provoking Stories section) in Canada.

Firefox 96 was released on January 11, 2022. Among the many additions and removals were: significant improvements in noise-suppression and auto-gain-control as well as slight improvements in echo-cancellation, reduced main-thread load, the default of all cookies to having a SameSite=lax attribute which helps defend against Cross-Site Request Forgery (CSRF) attacks, the selection of printing odd/even pages, history highlights to recently visited sites, the display of better images for recent bookmarks on the home page, and improved "fill link from clipboard for Android 12 (Android).

Firefox 97 was released on February 8, 2022. Among the many additions and removals were: support and display for the new style of scrollbars on Windows 11, improvements to system font loading which makes opening and switching to new tabs faster in certain situations for macOS, removal of the 18 colorway themes of Firefox 94, removal of support for directly generating PostScript for printing on Linux, with the exception of printing to Postscript printers, and the addition of a new prompt when users attempt to leave private browsing with active downloads (Android).

Firefox 98 was released on March 8, 2022. Among the many additions were: a new optimized download flow, in which, instead of prompting every time, files will download automatically, allowing users to choose from a number of built-in search engines to set as their default, the ability to change Wallpapers on Homepage, and the ability to clear cookies and website data for a single domain (Android). Also, Yandex and Mail.ru were removed as optional search providers.

Firefox 99 was released on April 5, 2022. Among the many additions were: the ability to toggle Narrate in ReaderMode with the keyboard shortcut "n", added support for search—with or without diacritics—in the PDF viewer, support for credit card autofill and capture in Germany and France, the ability to clear cookies and data for a single domain, and improved performance of Pocket articles on the homescreen (Android).

Firefox 100 was released on May 3, 2022. Among the many additions were: support for captions/subtitles display on YouTube, Amazon Prime Video, and Netflix videos watched in Picture-in-Picture, which now supports video captions on websites that use WebVTT (Web Video Text Track) format, support for HDR video on macOS, hardware accelerated AV1 video decoding on Windows with supported GPUs, video overlay on Windows for Intel GPUs, reducing power usage during video playback, improved fairness between painting and handling other events, support for credit card autofill and capture in the UK, support for profiling multiple java threads, updated History, and bookmark search (Android).

Firefox 101 was released on May 31, 2022. Among the many additions were: the prefers-contrast media query, which allows sites to detect if the user has requested that web content is presented with a higher (or lower) contrast, all non-configured MIME types that can now be assigned a custom action upon download completion, the use of as many microphones at the same time, during video conferencing, added support for large, small, dynamic viewport units and logical ones (*vi and *vb), added web conferencing support for enumerating and selecting multiple audio input devices through navigator.mediaDevices.enumerateDevices(), and added support for using the magnifier on Android 9+ for positioning the cursor in forms on web pages (Android).

=== Firefox 102 through 114 ===
Firefox 102 and Firefox 102 ESR, released on June 28, 2022, gained the ability to turn off the automatic opening of the download pane, protections against tracking through URL query parameters when Enhanced Tracking Protection is set to "strict", subtitles in Picture-in-Picture (PiP) for sites including HBO Max and Disney+, and improved security by isolating audio decoding into its own sandboxed process.

Firefox 103, released on July 26, 2022, improved responsiveness on macOS during periods of high CPU load by switching to a modern lock API, required fields highlighted in PDF forms, improved performance on high-refresh rate monitors (120 Hz+), improved Picture-in-Picture subtitles, which are now available at Funimation, Dailymotion, Tubi, Hotstar, and SonyLIV, buttons in the Tabs toolbar reachable with Tab, Shift+Tab, and Arrow keys, Windows' "Make text bigger" accessibility setting now affecting all the UI and content pages, rather than only applying to system font sizes, the browser getting pinned to the Windows taskbar during installation on Windows 10 and 11, the removal of a configuration option to allow SHA-1 signatures in certificates; which are not supported, and AMD hardware acceleration support was added.

Firefox 104 was released on August 23, 2022. Among the many additions and removals were: the availability of subtitles for Disney+ in Picture-in-Picture, support for both the scroll-snap-stop property as well as re-snapping, and the ability of the Firefox profiler to analyze power usage of a website for Apple M1 and Windows 11 only, while the Firefox UI itself will now be throttled for performance and battery usage when minimized or occluded, in the same way background tabs are.

Firefox 105 was released on September 20, 2022. Among the many additions and removals were: an option to print only the current page from the print preview dialog, support for partitioned service workers in third-party contexts, a swipe to navigate (two fingers on a touchpad swiped left or right to perform history back or forward) on Windows, compliance with the User Timing L3 specification, which adds additional optional arguments to the performance.mark and performance.measure methods to provide custom start times, end times, duration, and attached details, faster searching in large lists for individual items, which replaces array.includes and array.indexOf with an optimized SIMD version, support for the Offscreen Canvas DOM API with full context and font support.

Firefox 106 was released on October 18, 2022. Among the many additions and removals were: the possibility to edit PDFs: including writing text, drawing, and adding signatures, the ability to become the default PDF application on Windows systems on setting Firefox as the default browser, the ability to pin the Windows taskbar on Windows 10 and 11 for simpler access, the redesign of private windows to increase the feeling of privacy, swipe-to-navigate (two fingers on a touchpad swiped left or right to perform history back or forward) for Linux users on Wayland, Text Recognition in images for users of macOS 10.15 and higher, the addition of "Firefox View", the introduction of 18 new Colorways with the launch of "Independent Voices" collection, major upgrade to WebRTC capabilities, and wallpapers for the "Independent Voices" collection.

Firefox 107 was released on November 15, 2022. Among the many additions and removals were: improved performance of the instance when Microsoft's IME and Defender retrieve the URL of a focused document in Windows 11 version 22H2, support of power profiling (visualizing performance data recorded from web browsers) on Linux and Mac with Intel CPUs, in addition to Windows 11 and Apple Silicon, a couple of helpful improvements in DevTools making it easier to debug WebExtensions, with a new argument allowing users to automatically open DevTools just in case, and a Reload button in the DevTools toolbox to see the changes, the availability of Total Cookie Protection, and enabled text selection magnifier for website text.

Firefox 108 was released on December 13, 2022. Among the many additions and removals were: enabling by default of import maps, which allow web pages to control the behavior of JavaScript imports, processes used for background tabs getting the use of efficiency mode on Windows 11 to limit resource use, the ability to open the Process manager via the Shift+Esc keyboard shortcut, improved frame scheduling when under load, support for properly color correcting images tagged with ICCv4 profiles, support for the WebMIDI API and a new experimental mechanism for controlling access to dangerous capabilities, the ability to save web pages as PDF files to conveniently access them later from the Downloads folder, and the ability to organize tabs in the tabs tray by long-pressing on a tab.

Firefox 109 was released on January 17, 2023. Among the many additions and removals were: the enabling of Manifest Version 3 (MV3) extension support by default, the enabling of the Arbitrary Code Guard exploit protection in the media playback utility processes, the native HTML date picker for date and datetime inputs being used with a keyboard alone, a built-in dictionary for the Firefox spellchecker for builds in the Spanish and Argentine Spanish locales, and the removal of Colorways.

Firefox 110 was released on February 14, 2023. Major changes included support for importing bookmarks, history, and password data from the Opera GX and Vivaldi web browsers, support for Canvas2D GPU-acceleration, support for GPU "sandboxing" on Windows, and various security fixes along with various improvements made to WebGL to improve performance. There were also various features added for web developers such as support for CSS size container queries.

Firefox 111 was released on March 14, 2023. Among the many additions and removals were: the enabling of Windows native notifications, the ability for Firefox Relay users to opt-in to create Relay email masks directly from the credential manager, the Silhe Friulian (fur) and Sardinian (sc) locales, support of the use of the rel attribute on form elements, allowing the specification of the relationship between the current document and the form target in a simpler, cross-browser way, the enabling of Origin private file system access, a new storage API that enables web applications to store and retrieve data from and to the filesystem in a sandbox, the ability for Android users to view PDF documents as they browse, and the addition of Total Cookie Protection to Enhanced Tracking Protection's Strict Mode.

Firefox 112 was released on April 11, 2023. Major changes included the ability to reveal passwords in password fields, the ability to use the middle click button on a mouse to close tabs in the tab list, along with the ability to use the Ctrl + Shift + T keyboard shortcut to restore a previous browser session, among other changes and bug fixes.

Firefox 113 was released on May 9, 2023. Major changes included enhanced Picture-in-Picture; private windows protecting users even better by blocking third-party cookies and storage of content trackers; the inclusion of special characters in passwords generated by the browser; support for AV1 Image Format files containing animations (AVIS), improving support for AVIF images across the web; a tighter Windows GPU sandbox; and the availability of the browser in the Tajik (tg) language.

Firefox 114 was released on June 6, 2023. Major changes included an added UI to manage the DNS over HTTPS exception list; the accessibility of the Bookmarks menu by adding the Bookmarks menu button to the toolbar, the ability for the user to restrict searches to their local browsing history by selecting Search history from the History, Library or Application menu buttons; the ability for macOS users to capture video from their cameras in all supported native resolutions, enabling resolutions higher than 1280x720; the possibility for users to reorder the extensions listed in the extensions panel; the preference of FIDO2 / WebAuthn authenticators over USB; the availability of Pocket Recommended content in France, Italy, and Spain (desktop); and the Open in app button in PDF viewer opening PDFs in an external app (Android).

=== Firefox 115 through 127 ===
Firefox 115 and Firefox 115 ESR were released on July 4, 2023, adding the ability to bring over payment methods saved in Chrome-based browsers and enabling hardware video decoding for Intel GPUs on Linux. This version is also notable for the unusually longer lifespan of its ESR branch, as it was subject to an exceptional support extension to allow older versions of Windows and macOS to continue receiving security updates where upgrading was not possible.

Firefox 116 was released on August 1, 2023. Starting with Firefox 116, Microsoft Windows support is exclusively for Windows 10 and above, and macOS support is exclusive to 10.15 and above. New features included a sidebar switcher for Bookmarks, History, and Synced Tabs, the ability to copy files from the operating system and paste them into the browser, and a volume slider in Picture-in-Picture.

Firefox 117 was released on August 29, 2023, extending credit card autofill to users in IT, ES, AT, BE, and PL locales, and adding improved CSS nesting support by default.

Firefox 118 was released on September 26, 2023, introducing automated translation of web content via the EU-funded Project Bergamot, and support for several new CSS math functions.

Firefox 119 was released on October 24, 2023, adding a PDF editor, the ability to import extensions from Google Chrome, and Encrypted Client Hello (ECH) support to extend encryption coverage during TLS handshakes.

Firefox 120 was released on November 21, 2023, adding a "Copy Link Without Site Tracking" context menu option, Global Privacy Control support, and enabling Cookie Banner Blocker and URL Tracking Protection by default in private windows for users in Germany.

Firefox 121 was released on December 19, 2023, defaulting to the Wayland compositor on Linux, adding support for the :has() CSS selector, lazy loading iframes, and Voice Control commands on macOS.

Firefox 122 was released on January 23, 2024, adding support for creating and using passkeys stored in iCloud Keychain on macOS, a new .deb package for Linux users, and displaying images and descriptions for search suggestions.

Firefox 123 was released on February 20, 2024, integrating search into Firefox View and introducing the Web Compatibility Reporting Tool, along with support for declarative ShadowDOM.

Firefox 124 was released on March 19, 2024, sorting open tabs by recent activity in Firefox View, improving the Windows taskbar jump list, and using the macOS fullscreen API for all types of fullscreen windows.

Firefox 125 was released on April 16, 2024, adding AV1 codec support for Encrypted Media Extensions, text highlighting in the PDF viewer, and a URL Paste Suggestion feature for quickly visiting URLs copied to the clipboard.

Firefox 126 was released on May 14, 2024, expanding the Copy Without Site Tracking feature to block over 300 tracking parameters from copied links, and adding support for zstandard (zstd) content-encoding compression.

Firefox 127 was released on June 11, 2024, adding a Close Duplicate Tabs command, auto-launching at system startup, and requiring device sign-in when accessing stored passwords on macOS and Windows.

=== Firefox 128 through 139 ===
Firefox 128 and Firefox 128 ESR were released on July 9, 2024, adding the ability to translate selected text from the context menu, support for protected content playback in Private Browsing mode, and a simpler dialog for clearing user data.

Firefox 129 was released on August 6, 2024, adding an enhanced Text and Layout menu in Reader View, tab previews on hover, and replacing HTTP with HTTPS as the default protocol in the address bar for non-local sites.

Firefox 130 was released on September 3, 2024, introducing a new Firefox Labs page in Settings for trying experimental features such as an AI Chatbot sidebar, enabling the Web Codecs API on desktop, and expanding translation support to additional languages.

Firefox 131 was released on October 1, 2024, offering to temporarily remember permissions granted to sites, reintroducing search engine home page navigation via Shift+Enter when the search bar is empty, and adding support for text fragments in URLs.

Firefox 132 was released on October 29, 2024, rolling out Microsoft PlayReady encrypted media playback on Windows, adding Wide Color Gamut WebGL support for Windows and macOS, and adding support for a post-quantum key exchange mechanism for TLS 1.3.

Firefox 133 was released on November 26, 2024, introducing Bounce Tracking Protection in Enhanced Tracking Protection's Strict mode, enabling GPU-accelerated Canvas2D by default on Windows, and adding support for the keepalive option in the Fetch API.

Firefox 134 was released on January 7, 2025, adding support for hardware-accelerated HEVC video playback on Windows, a refreshed New Tab layout for users in the US and Canada, and support for touchpad hold gestures on Linux.

Firefox 135 was released on February 4, 2025, adding Simplified Chinese, Japanese, Korean, and Russian language support to Firefox Translations, rolling out credit card autofill globally, and removing the "Do Not Track" checkbox from Preferences.

Firefox 136 was released on March 4, 2025, introducing a new vertical tabs layout and an optional updated sidebar in Settings, adding support for HEVC video playback on macOS, hardware video decoding for AMD GPUs on Linux, and making the browser available for ARM64 Linux.

Firefox 137 was released on April 1, 2025, rolling out tab groups, a refreshed Address Bar, and the ability to sign PDFs and use the address bar as a calculator.

Firefox 138 was released on April 29, 2025, introducing profile management, making Tab Groups widely available, and adding support for Import Attributes in JavaScript modules.

Firefox 139 was released on May 27, 2025, adding Full-Page Translations for extension pages, New Tab custom wallpapers, enabling the Temporal proposal by default as a modern replacement for the JavaScript Date API, and announcing the shutdown of the Review Checker feature on June 10, 2025.

=== Firefox 140 through 152 ===
Firefox 140 and Firefox 140 ESR were released on June 24, 2025, adding the ability to unload tabs via right-click, removing the Pocket toolbar icon and New Tab integration, and making Service Workers available in Private Browsing Mode.

Firefox 141 was released on July 22, 2025, adding a local AI model that identifies and groups similar tabs, the ability to use the address bar as a unit converter, and enabling the WebGPU API on Windows.

Firefox 142 was released on August 19, 2025, grouping New Tab article recommendations into topic sections, introducing Link Previews, and adding support for the Prioritized Task Scheduling API.

Firefox 143 was released on September 16, 2025, adding support for running websites as web apps pinned to the Windows taskbar, tab pinning by drag, Copilot as an available sidebar chatbot, and adding support for Windows UI Automation to improve accessibility tool support.

Firefox 144 was released on October 14, 2025, encrypting stored passwords using AES-256-CBC, adding visual search powered by Google Lens, and adding support for the View Transitions API Level 1.

Firefox 145 was released on November 11, 2025, introducing a new phase of privacy protections in Private Browsing and ETP Strict mode that cuts the percentage of users seen as unique by nearly half, adding a comments sidebar for PDFs, and enabling Enhanced Bounce Tracking Protection's stateless mode by default in ETP Strict.

Firefox 146 was released on December 9, 2025, adding a dedicated GPU process by default on macOS, native support for fractional scaled displays on Linux (Wayland), and adding support for the @scope CSS rule.

Firefox 147 was released on January 13, 2026, adding WebGPU support on all supported macOS versions for Apple Silicon, enabling local network access restrictions for ETP Strict users, and adding support for the Navigation API and CSS anchor positioning.

Firefox 148 was released on February 24, 2026, adding an AI Controls section to Settings, support for the Trusted Types and Sanitizer APIs, and adding Traditional Chinese and Vietnamese language support for translations.

Firefox 149 was released on March 24, 2026, introducing a Split View feature for comparing two pages side by side, a free built-in VPN, hardware acceleration for PDF loading, and automatic blocking of notifications from malicious sites flagged by SafeBrowsing.

Firefox 150 was released on April 21, 2026, improving Split View, adding a built-in PDF editor for reordering, copying, and deleting pages, a new about:translations page for real-time private translations, and a new .rpm package for RPM-based Linux distributions.

Firefox 151 was released on May 19, 2026, improving the New Tab screen and Private Browsing Mode, strengthening protection against fingerprinting in Standard Enhanced Tracking Protection, merging multiple PDFs directly in the PDF viewer, access of the Translations page through the More Tools section of the Application Menu, adding local profile backups on Linux, improving Apple's Universal Clipboard and dropdown menus on web pages on macOS, and enabling address autofill for users in the Netherlands.

Firefox 152 was released on June 16, 2026, adding a new look for the Settings mode; the ability for users to temporarily disable tracker blocking for a tab if it is causing a site to break; the ability for users to type "mute" (or "shush" or "sssh") and use the address bar quick action to silence every tab currently playing sound across all the browser windows; improved support for more advanced cursor movement commands, including those relating to paragraph boundaries, on macOS; the ability for Windows and Linux users to copy links via the tab context menu by right-clicking a tab and selecting Share > Copy Link, making it easy to copy a link without switching to the tab first; a "Send tab" toolbar button that can be added via More Tools > Customize Toolbar; the Basque and Galician translations; and a built-in dictionary for the spellchecker for builds in Croatian, English (UK), Georgian, Persian, Slovenian, Tajik, Tamil, Tibetan, Turkish, Welsh, and Xhosa.

=== Firefox 153 through 174 ===
Firefox 153 and Firefox 153 ESR were released on July 21, 2026, adding the High Dynamic Range (HDR) video playback on Windows; containers that let users keep separate parts of their online life logged into different accounts in the same browser window, but keep their cookies and ad tracking isolated inside each container; the ability for users to share any open page with a QR code; the ability for users to merge multiple PDFs by dragging a PDF into the PDF sidebar and add images as new pages within PDFs using the PDF editor; the "Pick a color" quick action; support for Apple's system-wide full-screen keyboard command (Globe-F); the verification and display of Qualified Website Authentication Certificates (QWACs) in accordance with eIDAS regulations; improved support for videos with overlays so users can more easily access video actions from context menus; the ability to highlight the location permission icon in red whenever a website has access to users' locations; Smart Window; and Firefox Labs.

Firefor 154 was released on August 18, 2026, extending the Local Network Access protections to WebSocket connections; and adding the browser's ability to suggest groups of related tabs and propose a name for each group in Smart Window; Windows support for NVIDIA GeForce NOW, letting users stream supported PC games directly in the browser; the availability of local profile backups on macOS in addition to Windows and Linux, and the restoration of backups across all three platforms; exempting sites from having their cookies and site data cleared on shutdown without also being exempted from tracking protection and other cookie restrictions; adding the ability for the full-page Translations feature to translate <iframe> content and to run language identification on all page loads, resulting in an improved experience for offering translations to users; the ability for users in Windows to choose a different app icon in Settings; the inclusion of a Manage AI quick action in the address bar that opens the AI controls in Settings; and the ability of performance of a hard reload on a page to clear and update its cached favicons.

Firefox 155 was released on September 1, 2026, adding Smart Window for all users in the USA, Canada, and France to try out; personalized resume conversation starters to help users quickly return to topics they’ve been working on; faster response to Assistant with Exa web search source citations to provide accurate, trustworthy web grounding in roughly 1/5 the time; Organized Tabs suggesting better groupings of users' related tabs and giving each group a clearer, more descriptive name; the ability to show how many trackers it has blocked in the address bar, making built-in privacy protections easier to see while browsing; Nintendo Switch Pro and compatible aftermarket controllers fully working in web games on Windows, with the directional pad and analog sticks correctly mapped; the ability for containers to be reordered in Settings, and the new order being used wherever containers are listed; and support for the Marathi and Urdu languages in the Translations feature.

Firefox 156 was released on September 15, 2026, setting the browser on macOS to open automatically when the computer starts up, from the Startup section of Settings; adding localized Wikipedia and occasional sponsored suggestions in the address bar in France, Germany, and Italy; and improving the startup speed of the built-in PDF viewer and memory and CPU usage when the browser displays large JPEG images scaled down to fit a page.

Firefox 157 was released on September 29, 2026, adding a modernized look across the browser toolbars, sidebar, menus and individual features, built with an updated design system, including new built-in themes with light and dark versions, to personalize the browser's look with one click, and a new compact mode that reduces toolbar and tab spacing to leave more room for web content, useful on smaller screens and in split-screen layouts; adding the ability for WebRTC video calls to use hardware AV1 decoding on devices that support it, instead of always decoding AV1 video in software; adding a warning in the site information panel (the shield icon in the address bar) and in Settings when it has been set up to record its encryption keys, which could let other software on the computer read encrypted web traffic; and adding suggestions in the address bar in Austria, Belgium, Czech Republic, Denmark, Finland, Hungary, Ireland, Luxembourg, Netherlands, Norway, Poland, Portugal, Slovakia, Spain, Sweden, and Switzerland, which can be controlled in the browser's Suggest settings.

Firefox 158 was released on October 13, 2026, adding a Smart Window to help users fill in forms faster; creating more accessible PDFs when saving a page as PDF, and when printing on Linux and macOS, which also fixes a variety of PDF rendering issues, such as missing math symbols; adding support for the JPEG XL image format, which generally has better compression than WebP, JPEG, PNG, and GIF; improving the New Tab that keeps a library of custom wallpapers under Your images, rather than only the most recent one; and adding support for the Albanian, Belarusian, and Filipino languages.

Firefox 159 was released on October 27, 2026, adding in the native macOS share picker, which shows a preview of the page and recent contacts alongside AirDrop, Messages, and other apps; the availability of saved passwords from the sidebar by default, without having to add the Passwords tool first; and the ability for Smart Window to watch pages for changes such as price drops or restocks (watches can be managed from the Tasks button in the toolbar or the about:smartwindowtasks page).

Firefox 160 was released on November 10, 2026, adding in a playback speed setting for the Picture-in-Picture player, with options ranging from 0.25x to 2.0x speed; the ability for Mini Window to move a tab or a selected part of a page into an always-on-top window while browsing; and the ability for history entries to be dragged from the sidebar to the tab strip to open them in new tabs; changing the address bar context menu to show "Paste and Search" instead of "Paste and Go" when the copied text is a search term rather than a web address; adding the ability for pages saved as PDF to make mathematical content (MathML) accessible to assistive technology such as screen readers; a "Never Allow" button for websites that repeatedly ask to handle email (mailto:) and other links (blocked sites can be managed in Settings); the ability for the browser to play Matroska (MKV) files with FLAC, MP3, or PCM audio; the rendering of WebGL content on macOS using Apple's Metal graphics API, which can improve performance on some sites; and the French translation of Organize Tabs in Smart Window.

== CPU architectures ==
=== x86 family ===
Native 64-bit builds are officially supported on Linux, macOS, and Windows (since version 42).

Mozilla made Firefox for 64-bit Linux a priority with the release of Firefox 4, labeling it as tier 1 priority. Since being labeled tier 1, Mozilla has been providing official 64-bit releases for its browser for Linux. Vendor-backed 64-bit support has existed for Linux distributions such as Novell/SUSE Linux, Red Hat Enterprise Linux, and Ubuntu prior to Mozilla's 64-bit support, even though vendors were faced with the challenge of having to turn off the 64-bit JIT compiler due to its instability prior to Firefox 4.

The official releases of Firefox for macOS are universal builds that include both 32-bit and 64-bit versions of the browser in one package, and have been this way since Firefox 4. A typical browsing session uses a combination of the 64-bit browser process and a 32-bit plugin process, because some popular plugins still are 32-bit. As of April 19, 2017, Firefox 53 has dropped support for 32-bit macOS.

The 32-bit and 64-bit versions of Windows can be used to run 32-bit Firefox. In late 2012, Mozilla announced 64-bit Windows builds would be stopped but later reversed the decision. As of April 2015, 64-bit Windows builds are available as 38.0 Beta and newer. 64-bit builds for Windows are officially supported as of November 2015 with the release of Firefox 42.

=== Other CPU architectures ===
Besides x86, Firefox also supported other CPU architectures including ARMv7, SPARC, PowerPC, and 68k on different tiers. Mozilla terminated support for PowerPC-based Macintosh computers with Firefox 3.6, but a third-party project known as TenFourFox ported several newer versions of Firefox, the latest being based on Firefox 45 ESR.

== Release compatibility ==
Operating system		Latest stable version	Support status
Windows	10 and later, Server 2016 and later	160.0.1 (ARM64)	2019–
Windows	10 and later, Server 2016 and later	153.7.0esr (ARM64)	2019–
Windows	10 and later, Server 2016 and later	160.0.1 (x64)	2015–
Windows	10 and later, Server 2016 and later	153.7.0esr (x64)	2015–
Windows	10 and later, Server 2016 and later	160.0.1 (IA-32)	2015–
Windows	10 and later, Server 2016 and later	153.7.0esr (IA-32)	2015–
Windows	7, Server 2008 R2, 8, Server 2012, 8.1 and Server 2012 R2	115.45.0esr (x64)	2015–2027
Windows	7, Server 2008 R2, 8, Server 2012, 8.1 and Server 2012 R2	115.45.0esr (IA-32)	2009–2027
Windows	XP, Server 2003, Vista and Server 2008	52.9.0esr (IA-32)	2004–2018
Windows	2000	10.0.12esr	2004–2013
Windows	2000	12.0	2004–2012
Windows	NT 4.0 (IA-32), 98 and Me	2.0.0.20	2004–2008
Windows	95	1.5.0.12	2004–2007
macOS	11 (ARM64 and x64) and later	160.0.1	2020–
macOS	11 (ARM64 and x64) and later	153.7.0esr	2020–
macOS	10.15 (x64) and later	160.0.1	2019–
macOS	10.15 (x64) and later	153.7.0esr	2019–
macOS	10.12–10.14	115.45.0esr	2016–2027
macOS	10.9–10.11	78.15.0esr	2013–2021
macOS	10.6–10.8	45.9.0esr	2009–2017
macOS	10.6–10.8	48.0.2	2009–2016
macOS	10.5 (IA-32 and x64)	10.0.12esr	2007–2013
macOS	10.5 (IA-32 and x64)	16.0.2	2007–2012
macOS	10.4 (IA-32 and PPC)–10.5 (PPC)	3.6.28	2005–2012
macOS	10.2–10.3	2.0.0.20	2004–2008
macOS	10.0–10.1	1.0.8	2004–2006
Linux (X11/Wayland)		160.0.1 (ARM64)	2025–
Linux (X11/Wayland)		153.7.0esr (ARM64)	2025–
Linux (X11/Wayland)		160.0.1 (x64)	2011–
Linux (X11/Wayland)		153.7.0esr (x64)	2011–
Linux (X11/Wayland)		140.17.0esr (IA-32)	2004–2026
Linux (X11/Wayland)		144.0.2 (IA-32)	2004–2025

Legend:
Unsupported
Supported
Latest version

Notes

- In March 2014, the Windows Store app version of Firefox was cancelled, although there is a beta release.
- SSE2 instruction set support is required for 49.0 or later for Windows and 53.0 or later for Linux, IA-32 support only applies to superscalar processors.
- The x64 build for Windows (introduced with Firefox 43) was exclusive to Windows 7 and later. All previous versions of Windows have to use the IA-32 build.

Operating system		Latest stable version	Support status
Android (including Android-x86 and Android for ARMv6)	8.0 and later	160.0 (x64)	2018–
Android (including Android-x86 and Android for ARMv6)	8.0 and later	160.0 (ARM64)	2017–
Android (including Android-x86 and Android for ARMv6)	8.0 and later	160.0 (ARMv7)	2017–
Android (including Android-x86 and Android for ARMv6)	5.0–7.1	143.0.4 (x64)	2018–2025
Android (including Android-x86 and Android for ARMv6)	5.0–7.1	143.0.4 (ARM64)	2017–2025
Android (including Android-x86 and Android for ARMv6)	5.0–7.1	143.0.4 (IA-32)	2014–2025
Android (including Android-x86 and Android for ARMv6)	5.0–7.1	143.0.4 (ARMv7)	2014–2025
Android (including Android-x86 and Android for ARMv6)	4.1–4.4	68.11.0 (x64)	2018–2020
Android (including Android-x86 and Android for ARMv6)	4.1–4.4	68.11.0 (IA-32)	2013–2020
Android (including Android-x86 and Android for ARMv6)	4.1–4.4	68.11.0 (ARMv7)	2012–2020
Android (including Android-x86 and Android for ARMv6)	4.0	55.0.2 (IA-32)	2013–2017
Android (including Android-x86 and Android for ARMv6)	4.0	55.0.2 (ARMv7)	2011–2017
Android (including Android-x86 and Android for ARMv6)	3.0–3.2	45.0.2 (ARMv7)	2011–2016
Android (including Android-x86 and Android for ARMv6)	2.3	47.0 (ARMv7)	2011–2016
Android (including Android-x86 and Android for ARMv6)	2.2–4.4	31.3.0esr (ARMv6)	2012–2015
Android (including Android-x86 and Android for ARMv6)	2.2	31.0 (ARMv7)	2011–2014
Android (including Android-x86 and Android for ARMv6)	2.1	19.0.2 (ARMv6)	2012–2013
Android (including Android-x86 and Android for ARMv6)	2.1	19.0.2 (ARMv7)	2011–2013
Android (including Android-x86 and Android for ARMv6)	2.0	6.0.2 (ARMv7)	2011
Firefox OS	2.2	35/36/37	2015
Firefox OS	2.1	33/34	2014–2015
Firefox OS	2.0	31/32	2014–2015
Firefox OS	1.4	30	2014
Firefox OS	1.3	28	2014
Firefox OS	1.2	26	2013
Firefox OS	1.1	18	2013
Maemo	5	7.0.1	2010–2011
Maemo	4	1.1	2010–2011
Windows Mobile	6.x	1.0a3	N/A

Legend:
Unsupported
Supported
Latest version

Notes

- Firefox for iOS is not listed in this table as its version numbers would be misleading. Prior to version 96, it used version numbers distinct from other Firefox versions, which share the core Gecko rendering engine. The iOS app uses the operating system's rendering engine (WebKit), rather than Mozilla's (Gecko).

Operating system		Status
RHEL	10	current (ESR (s390x))
RHEL	7	historic (52.7.3esr (s390))
RHEL	5	historic (31.6.0esr (IA-64))
Solaris	11	current (ESR (x64, SPARC V9))
Solaris	10 and OpenSolaris	historic (52.9.0esr (IA-32, SPARC V9))
Solaris	8–9	historic (2.0.0.20 (IA-32, SPARC V9))
OpenIndiana	Hipster	current (x64)
AIX	7.1 and 7.2	historic (3.6.25 (POWER))
HP-UX	11i v2–v3	historic (3.5.9 (IA-64, PA-RISC))
FreeBSD (Tier 1)	13 and later	current (x64, ARM64)
FreeBSD (Tier 1)	13 and later	current (ESR (x64, ARM64))
FreeBSD (Tier 1)	12	historic (121.0 (IA-32))
FreeBSD (Tier 1)	12	historic (115.6.0esr (IA-32))
OpenBSD -stable	8.0	current (x64, ARM64, RISC-V)
OpenBSD -stable	8.0	current (ESR (x64, ARM64, RISC-V))
OpenBSD -stable	6.9	historic (88.0.1 (IA-32))
OpenBSD -stable	6.9	historic (78.14.0esr (IA-32))
OpenBSD -stable	5.8	historic (38.7.1esr (PPC))
OpenBSD -stable	5.7	historic (31.6.0esr (SPARC V9))
MeeGo/Harmattan		historic (15 (ARMv7))

== See also ==
- Timeline of web browsers
- History of free and open-source software
- History of Mozilla Application Suite
- History of Mozilla Thunderbird
- Debian–Mozilla trademark dispute
