= Bergamasco (surname) =

Bergamasco is a surname of Italian origin. It is a male singular adjective referring to someone from Bergamo. Notable people with the surname are as follows:

- Arturo Bergamasco (born 1951), Italian rugby union football player
- Ernesto Bergamasco (born 1950), Italian boxer
- Eugenio Bergamasco (1858–1940), Italian engineer and politician
- Guglielmo Bergamasco (a.k.a. Guglielmo dei Grigi, c.1485–1550), Italian architect and sculptor
- Mauro Bergamasco (born 1979), Italian rugby union football player
- Mirco Bergamasco (born 1983), Italian rugby union football player
- Rafael Santos Bergamasco (a.k.a. Rafael Akai, born 1986), Brazilian football player
- Sonia Bergamasco (born 1966), Italian actress
