= Rafael Akai =

Brazilian footballer (born 1986)

Personal information
- Full name: Rafael Santos Bergamasco
- Date of birth: January 17, 1986 (age 40)
- Place of birth: Presidente Prudente, Brazil
- Height: 1.82 m (6 ft 0 in)
- Position: Striker

Team information
- Current team: Olímpia

Youth career
- 2003–2005: Mirassol
- 2004: Cruzeiro
- 2005: São Caetano

Senior career*
Years	Team	Apps	(Gls)
2005	Paraná	2	(0)
2006–2007	Corinthians		
2006	→ 2 de Mayo (loan)		
2007	São José-SP		
2007	Mirassol		
2008	Londrina		
2008	→ Rostov (loan)	4	(0)
2009	Nacional-SP		
2009	Juventus-SC		
2010	Morrinhos		
2010	Colorado		
2010–2011	Luverdense		
2011	Marcílio Dias		
2011–	Olímpia		
- * Club domestic league appearances and goals as of November 23, 2011

Rafael Santos Bergamasco or simply Rafael Akai (born January 17, 1986, in Presidente Prudente), is a Brazilian striker currently playing for Olímpia Futebol Clube.

== Career ==
Rafael Akai signed for Sport Club Corinthians Paulista, and made his senior debut in the Campeonato Paulista on 19 March 2006, after manager Ademar Braga rested his first team for an upcoming Copa Libertadores match. He would make a total of four appearances for Corinthians, scoring once, in the 2006 Paulista before being sent on loan to Paraguayan side Club 2 de Mayo and later signing for São José Esporte Clube.

Rafael Akai made 4 goals in the Paranaense Championship 2008 playing for Londrina and moved to FC Rostov in the Russian First Division on loan.

== Contract ==
- 9 December 2005 to 31 January 2008
