= Bergamo (surname) =

Bergamo is an Italian surname. Notable people with the surname include:

- Almiro Bergamo (1912–1994), Italian rower
- Augie Bergamo (1917–1974), American baseball player
- Petar Bergamo (1930–2022), Yugoslav composer
- John Bergamo (1940–2013), American percussionist and composer
- Paolo Bergamo (born 1943), Italian football referee
- Rodolfo Bergamo (born 1955), Italian high jumper
