= HMS Bergamot =

Two ships of the Royal Navy have been named HMS Bergamot after the bergamot flower.

- HMS Bergamot (1917), an Anchusa-class sloop launched in May 1917 and sunk in August of that year by U-84.
- HMS Bergamot (K189), a Flower-class corvette launched in 1941. She served in World War II and was sold in 1946.
