= Bergamo (shopping mall) =

Shopping mall in Chennai, India

Bergamo is a shopping mall located in Nungambakkam, Chennai, India. It is located on Khader Nawaz Khan Road and has a gross leasable area of 30,000 sq ft (2,800 m^{2}). The mall opened in August 2012 with Louis Vuitton as its first store. The mall is designed by DSP architects and built by KKA Buildtech at a cost of ₹10 Crore. It is considered to be the first luxury mall in Chennai, and the third in India. The building is designed to house 24 stores, each with an area ranging from 1600 sq. ft to 2000 sq. ft. Named after an Italian city, the white three storey building is influenced by classical Italian architecture.
