= Bergamasque (disambiguation) =

Bergamasque may refer to:

- Bergamask or Bergomask, a type of dance
  - Bergomask, the second of Two Pieces for Piano (1925) by John Ireland (1879–1962)
- Bergamasque, a variant of Eastern Lombard, spoken mainly in the province of Bergamo in Lombardy, Italy
- Masques et bergamasques, an orchestral suite by Gabriel Fauré
- Suite bergamasque, a piano suite by Claude Debussy
