= Davide da Bergamo =

Italian monk, organist, and composer

Padre Davide da Bergamo
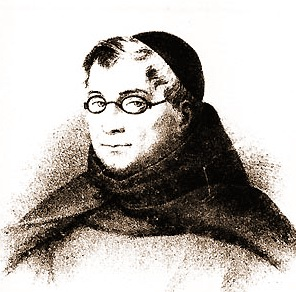
- Born: Felice Moretti; 21 January 1791; Zanica
- Died: 24 July 1863 (aged 72); Piacenza
- Occupations: Augustinian friar, composer and organist

Padre Davide Maria da Bergamo, born Felice Moretti (Zanica, 21 January 1791 – Piacenza, 24 July 1863), was an Italian Augustinian friar, famed for his skills as an organist and composer.

== Selected discography ==
- Padre Davide da Bergamo Vol.I – Musica per la Liturgia – Organist Marco Ruggeri. Tactus Records TC.792901 (2003)
- Padre Davide da Bergamo Vol.II – Il Repertorio da Concerto – Organist Marco Ruggeri. Tactus Records TC.792902 (2003)

== Media ==
Elevation in F
