= History of Mozilla Application Suite =

The history of the Mozilla Application Suite began with the release of the source code of the Netscape suite as an open source project. Going through years of hard work (with the help of the community contributors), Mozilla 1.0 was eventually released on June 5, 2002. Its backend code base, most notably the Gecko layout engine, has become the foundation of a number of applications based on Mozilla, including the Mozilla Foundation's flagship product Mozilla Firefox and Mozilla Thunderbird. While the suite is no longer a formal Mozilla product, its development and maintenance is continued as the SeaMonkey community project.

== Open sourcing of Communicator ==
In March 1998, Netscape Communications Corporation released most of the code base for its popular Netscape Communicator suite under an open source license. The name of the application developed from this would be Mozilla, coordinated by the newly created Mozilla Organization, at the mozilla.org website.

The open source release, which came at the height of the United States's late-1990s economic boom, was greeted by the Internet community with a mixture of acclaim and skepticism. In some circles, Netscape's source release was seen as both a victory for the free software movement and an opportunity for Netscape to tap the power of open source development. This view was particularly popular among users of Linux and other free software. Other observers, including many outside of the free software business community, interpreted the move as Netscape's surrender in the face of the ascendancy of Microsoft's Internet Explorer browser.

Regardless of the public's opinion, development with the Communicator code base proved harder than initially hoped:

- The Communicator code base was huge and complex.
- It had to be developed simultaneously on many operating systems, and therefore to cope with their differing APIs, GUIs, libraries and idiosyncrasies.
- It bore the scars of many rapid cycles of closed-source development on "Internet time". The short development cycles had led programmers to sacrifice modularity and elegance in the scramble to implement more features.
- Several parts of Communicator's code were never released as open source, due to licensing arrangements with third parties.

== Rewriting from scratch ==
Ultimately, the Mozilla core developers concluded that the old code could not be salvaged. As stated on the October 26, 1998 development roadmap, it was decided to scrap the whole code base and rewrite it from the ground up. The resulting plan included, among other things, the creation of a whole new cross-platform user interface library and a new layout engine.

Few observers foresaw the result. On December 7, 1998, Netscape released a special "preview" based on the Gecko layout engine. Gecko had already been in development for some time at Netscape under the internal name NGLayout (short for "Next Generation Layout"). It was noticeably faster and smaller than its predecessor (known as Mariner). One widely publicized feature of the first Gecko preview release was that it fit on a single 1.44 MB floppy disk, making it about one tenth the size of most contemporary browsers.

The prompt release of Gecko led many to believe that a complete browser could not be far behind. However, the first release of the layout engine was far from bug- and crash-free, and even farther from being ready for the prime-time. Producing a fully functional web browser required much more than the nascent rendering engine: the Mozilla developers soon envisioned a project more ambitious than a simple web browser. The new Mozilla (internally codenamed "Seamonkey") would be a platform for Internet applications, with a fully programmable user interface and a modular architecture. This Mozilla would function equally well as a host for email client, instant messaging client, news client, or any number of other applications.

Due to the effort required for this massive rewrite, the project fell far behind its original projected deadlines. In the years that followed, skepticism about Mozilla grew widespread, and some doubted that a finished Mozilla browser would ever see the light of day. However, the project persisted, continuing uninterrupted through both the purchase of Netscape by AOL and the end of the dot-com boom.

By June 5, 2002, the Mozilla project had produced version 1.0 of the browser that worked on multiple operating systems, including Linux, Mac OS, Microsoft Windows, and Solaris. The browser was praised for introducing new features that Internet Explorer lacked, including better support for user privacy preferences and some interface improvements. Additionally, the Mozilla browser became a de facto reference implementation for various World Wide Web Consortium standards, due to its strong support for those standards.

== Independence from AOL ==
On July 15, 2003, AOL announced that it would close down its browser division, which was in essence Netscape's Mozilla. AOL laid off most of Netscape's employees and hackers, except for some who were transferred to other divisions. Netscape signs were seen being pulled off its building, confirming what many took as the end of Netscape. AOL kept the Netscape brand for its portal, but the company no longer paid anyone to develop the Mozilla codebase.

On the same day, the Mozilla Foundation was created. The Foundation is a non-profit organization composed primarily of developers and staff from Mozilla Organization and owns the Mozilla trademark (but not the copyright to the source code, which is retained by the individual and corporate contributors, but licensed under the GPL, MPL and LGPL). It received initial $2 million donations from AOL, IBM, Sun Microsystems, and Red Hat, and $300,000 from Mitch Kapor.

Many people had been expecting this after AOL reached a settlement with competitor, Microsoft, with a deal for the AOL software to use Internet Explorer for the next 7 years. Netscape had always been seen as a bargaining chip for AOL against Microsoft.

== The end of the Suite ==
According to the Mozilla development roadmap published on April 2, 2003, the Mozilla Organization planned to focus development efforts on the new standalone applications: Phoenix (now known as Mozilla Firefox) and Minotaur (now known as Mozilla Thunderbird). Since then, many new features and enhancements have been added to the standalone applications only.

On March 10, 2005, the Mozilla Foundation announced that they would not release any further official versions of the suite beyond 1.7.x. However, the foundation emphasized that they would still provide infrastructure for community members who wished to continue development. In effect, this means that the suite will still continue to be developed, but not by the Mozilla Foundation itself. To avoid confusing organizations that still want to use the original Mozilla Suite, the new product needed a new name. On July 2, 2005, it was announced that the suite is going to be named SeaMonkey, which was originally the code name of the Mozilla Application Suite. The new project-leading group is known as the "SeaMonkey Council".

== Branding and visual identity ==
Various logos used during the development of Mozilla

Initially, the term "Mozilla" was loosely used to refer to a number of subjects, including the Mozilla project, the Mozilla Suite, the codebase of the Suite and its related technologies. Since the shifting of development focus, to distinguish the suite from the standalone products, the suite was marketed as "Mozilla Suite", or the more lengthy "Mozilla Application Suite".

It is often argued that since free software is typically only designed by programmers rather than graphic designers or usability gurus, it frequently suffers from poor icon and GUI design, and a lack of a strong visual identity.

During development of Mozilla, a number of logos were used in various areas of the application. The logos are inconsistent with each other; for example, the logo used as the program's icon is different from the one used as the throbber, which is again different from the one used in the "About" window.

== Release history ==
Parts of this table are based on the release notes of Mozilla.

| Old Version | Current Version | Future Version |

| Branch | Version | Release date | Significant changes |
|---|---|---|---|
| Milestone Releases | M3 | March 19, 1999 | |
| Milestone Releases | M4 | April 15, 1999 | |
| Milestone Releases | M5 | May 5, 1999 | |
| Milestone Releases | M6 | May 29, 1999 | |
| Milestone Releases | M7 | June 22, 1999 | |
| Milestone Releases | M8 | July 16, 1999 | |
| Milestone Releases | M9 | August 26, 1999 | |
| Milestone Releases | M10 | October 8, 1999 | |
| Milestone Releases | M11 | November 16, 1999 | |
| Milestone Releases | M12 | December 21, 1999 | |
| Milestone Releases | M13 | January 26, 2000 | |
| Milestone Releases | M14 | March 1, 2000 | |
| Milestone Releases | M15 | April 18, 2000 | |
| Milestone Releases | M16 | June 13, 2000 | ChatZilla, skin switching and auto complete were implemented. HTTP 1.1 was fully functional and was enabled by default. |
| Milestone Releases | M17 | August 7, 2000 | Scroll position was saved in session history. Improved auto complete and session history in the address bar. Improved cookie management. Alpha transparency for Windows (was already available on Mac and Linux). Plugin support for Linux (was already available in Windows and Mac). MNG support. |
| Milestone Releases | M18 | October 12, 2000 | Improved performance, stability, Java support, downloading / Helper App and mime type handling, tree sorting and column sizing, proxy and proxy auto configuration, auto complete, accelerators and mnemonics, and MailNews threading. about:plugins and toolbar customization were implemented. |
| 0.6 | 0.6 | December 6, 2000 | Base of Netscape 6 and Beonex Communicator 0.6. |
| 0.7 | 0.7 | January 9, 2001 | First Mac release with SSL support. Mouse wheel support improved and was available for Mac for the first time. Forced reload (not from cache) was implemented. Remember maximized state of windows across sessions. Navigation back and forward in framed sites was improved. |
| 0.8 | 0.8 | February 14, 2001 | Find and Replace was implemented. Improved support for system colors on Linux, Windows NT and Windows 2000. New preferences for display of animated GIFs. |
| 0.8 | 0.8.1 | March 26, 2001 | New and improved ChatZilla and JavaScript Console. Basic gopher support. Better FTP performance. SSL connections through proxy. |
| 0.9 | 0.9 | May 7, 2001 | Automatic proxy configuration was implemented. Late loading of Java for improved startup performance and footprint. Image rendering library was rewritten from scratch for increased performance. |
| 0.9 | 0.9.1 | June 7, 2001 | Stability improvements. Performance improvements in layout and networking. Bi-directional text support enabled for Hebrew and Arabic (Arabic shaping was Windows-only). Partial XSLT support turned on. |
| 0.9 | 0.9.2 | June 28, 2001 | Stability improvements. |
| 0.9 | 0.9.2.1 | August 8, 2001 | Source only (from which Netscape 6.1 was built). |
| 0.9 | 0.9.3 | August 2, 2001 | Stability improvements. Quick Launch with multiple profiles. |
| 0.9 | 0.9.4 | September 14, 2001 | Windows-only Quick Launch enabled by default. Viewing of Arabic language text on Linux and other systems. Improvements to offline IMAP. |
| 0.9 | 0.9.5 | October 12, 2001 | Venkman available in complete installation. Support of tabbed browsing. |
| 0.9 | 0.9.6 | November 20, 2001 | Support of page icon (except favicon), BMP and ICO images. Print Preview was implemented. |
| 0.9 | 0.9.7 | December 21, 2001 | DOM Inspector available in complete installation. Support of basic S/MIME functionality, favicon, longdesc attribute of the img element, and digest access authentication. Only load CSS served as "text/css" when under strict mode. Print preview was implemented on Macintosh. |
| 0.9 | 0.9.8 | February 4, 2002 | Support of Hebrew on Solaris. Support of Hebrew and Arabic on Mac OS. |
| 0.9 | 0.9.9 | March 11, 2002 | MathML enabled by default on Windows and Unix. Support of TrueType fonts on Unix. Support of SOAP. |
| 1.0 | 1.0 RC 1 | April 18, 2002 | |
| 1.0 | 1.0 RC 2 | May 10, 2002 | |
| 1.0 | 1.0 RC 3 | May 23, 2002 | |
| 1.0 | 1.0 | June 5, 2002 | Official Version 1.0 release. |
| 1.0 | 1.0.1 | September 10, 2002 | Fixes in security, stability and dataloss bugs. Base of Netscape 7.0 and Beonex Communicator 0.8.1. |
| 1.0 | 1.0.2 | January 7, 2003 | Fixes in security and stability bugs. |
| 1.1 | 1.1 Alpha | June 11, 2002 | |
| 1.1 | 1.1 Beta | July 22, 2002 | |
| 1.1 | 1.1 | August 26, 2002 | Improvements in application and layout performance; stability; web site compatibility; and CSS, DOM and HTML standards support. Download Manager as the default download view. MathML enabled for Mozilla on Macintosh (it was already available on Windows and Linux). Better bi-di Arabic and Hebrew support. Support of XBM. |
| 1.2 | 1.2 Alpha | September 11, 2002 | |
| 1.2 | 1.2 Beta | October 16, 2002 | |
| 1.2 | 1.2 | November 26, 2002 | Support of Type Ahead Find (now known as find as you type). Improvements to native look and feel in both the browser interface and the browser content area. Improvements in keyboard access and tabbing browsing. Support of link prefetching. XML "pretty printing" similar to that in Internet Explorer. |
| 1.2 | 1.2.1 ^{1} | December 2, 2002 | Fix of a DHTML bug. |
| 1.3 | 1.3 Alpha | December 13, 2002 | |
| 1.3 | 1.3 Beta | February 10, 2003 | |
| 1.3 | 1.3 | March 13, 2003 | An initial implementation of rich text editing controls. New splash screen. |
| 1.3 | 1.3.1 | May 7, 2003 | Restored XPI functionality for Mac OS X users. |
| 1.4 | 1.4 Alpha | April 1, 2003 | |
| 1.4 | 1.4 Beta | May 7, 2003 | |
| 1.4 | 1.4 RC 1 | May 29, 2003 | |
| 1.4 | 1.4 RC 2 | June 17, 2003 | |
| 1.4 | 1.4 RC 3 | June 24, 2003 | |
| 1.4 | 1.4 | June 30, 2003 | Support of NTLM authentication (Windows-only). Pop-up blocking has been streamlined to improve usability. |
| 1.4 | 1.4.1 | October 10, 2003 | |
| 1.5 | 1.5 Alpha | July 22, 2003 | |
| 1.5 | 1.5 Beta | August 27, 2003 | |
| 1.5 | 1.5 RC 1 | September 17, 2003 | |
| 1.5 | 1.5 RC 2 | September 26, 2003 | |
| 1.5 | 1.5 | October 15, 2003 | Spell checker for MailNews and Composer. Improvements to MailNews, Composer and tabbed browsing. Support of double-colon notation for CSS pseudo-elements. |
| 1.5 | 1.5.1 | November 26, 2003 | Mac OS X-only release to correct a downloading crash experienced by users of Mac OS X v10.1. |
| 1.6 | 1.6 Alpha | October 31, 2003 | about:about was implemented. |
| 1.6 | 1.6 Beta | December 9, 2003 | Fixes in security-related and crash bugs. Included a new cross-platform NTLM authentication mechanism. |
| 1.6 | 1.6 | January 15, 2004 | Improvements in standards compliance and faster page load times. CSS inheritance updated to work per CSS2.1 (computed values are inherited). |
| 1.7 | 1.7 Alpha | February 23, 2004 | |
| 1.7 | 1.7 Beta | March 18, 2004 | |
| 1.7 | 1.7 RC 1 | April 21, 2004 | |
| 1.7 | 1.7 RC 2 | May 17, 2004 | |
| 1.7 | 1.7 RC 3 | June 8, 2004 | |
| 1.7 | 1.7 | June 17, 2004 | Improvements in size and performance. Support of CSS3 opacity and JavaScript onbeforeunload event. |
| 1.7 | 1.7.1 | July 8, 2004 | Vulnerability patch. |
| 1.7 | 1.7.2 | August 4, 2004 | Vulnerability patch. |
| 1.7 | 1.7.3 | September 13, 2004 | Vulnerability patch. |
| 1.7 | 1.7.5 ^{2} | December 17, 2004 | Support of NPRuntime (extension to NPAPI). Support of undetectable document.all. |
| 1.7 | 1.7.6 | March 21, 2005 | Vulnerability patch. |
| 1.7 | 1.7.7 | April 15, 2005 | Vulnerability patch. |
| 1.7 | 1.7.8 | May 11, 2005 | Vulnerability patch. |
| 1.7 | 1.7.10 ^{3} | July 21, 2005 | Vulnerability patch. |
| 1.7 | 1.7.11 | August 1, 2005 | Fixes for regressions in Mail & Newsgroups. |
| 1.7 | 1.7.12 | September 21, 2005 | Vulnerability patch and regression fix. |
| 1.7 | 1.7.13 | April 21, 2006 | Vulnerability patch and stability fix; end-of-life for 1.7.x product line. |
| 1.7 | 1.7.13.2006071107 | July 11, 2006 | Last nightly update of Mozilla 1.7 |
| 1.8 | 1.8 Alpha 1 | May 20, 2004 | Support of CSS2 quotes. Significant changes in XUL tree widget. Dramatic increase in the maximum number of cookies. |
| 1.8 | 1.8 Alpha 2 | July 14, 2004 | Initial support of the new NPAPI extensions. |
| 1.8 | 1.8 Alpha 3 | August 18, 2004 | CSS at-rule for matching on site/document URL. Support of translucent windows on Windows and GTK2. Support of undetectable document.all. |
| 1.8 | 1.8 Alpha 4 | September 28, 2004 | Support for CSS3 cursors, overflow-x and overflow-y. CSS error reporting via the JavaScript Console. DHTML performance improvements. |
| 1.8 | 1.8 Alpha 5 | November 22, 2004 | Experimental support for CSS3 columns. |
| 1.8 | 1.8 Alpha 6 | January 12, 2005 | XML parser upgraded. Many stability and security fixes. Some parsing errors are now marked in red in view-source. |
| 1.8 | 1.8 Beta 1 | February 26, 2005 | Partial support of ECMAScript for XML (E4X). |

Note (1): 1.2.1 was the last official Mozilla.org public release to support Mac OS 9 "Classic". Technically though, 1.3a was the last version to support OS 9 but only via the use of the CarbonLib extension as explained in the 1.3a release notes. An unofficial port of 1.3a was later created in the form of WaMCom in an attempt to provide a stable build of 1.3 for OS 9 users.

Note (2): There was no Mozilla 1.7.4. The 1.7.5 version number was selected to match the internal Gecko version number of Mozilla Firefox 1.0.

Note (3): Mozilla 1.7.9 was cancelled. It was intended that Mozilla 1.7.9 would be released shortly after Mozilla Firefox 1.0.5 and Mozilla Thunderbird 1.0.5. However, regressions were found in the 1.0.5 versions of Firefox and Thunderbird after they were released, so Mozilla 1.7.9 was cancelled. Mozilla 1.7.10 was released shortly after Firefox 1.0.6 and Thunderbird 1.0.6.

== Screenshot gallery ==
The following screenshots show the evolution of user interface in Mozilla from M3 to 1.0. The interface of Mozilla was almost unchanged since version 1.0. Mozilla M11 is not available because of program crash.

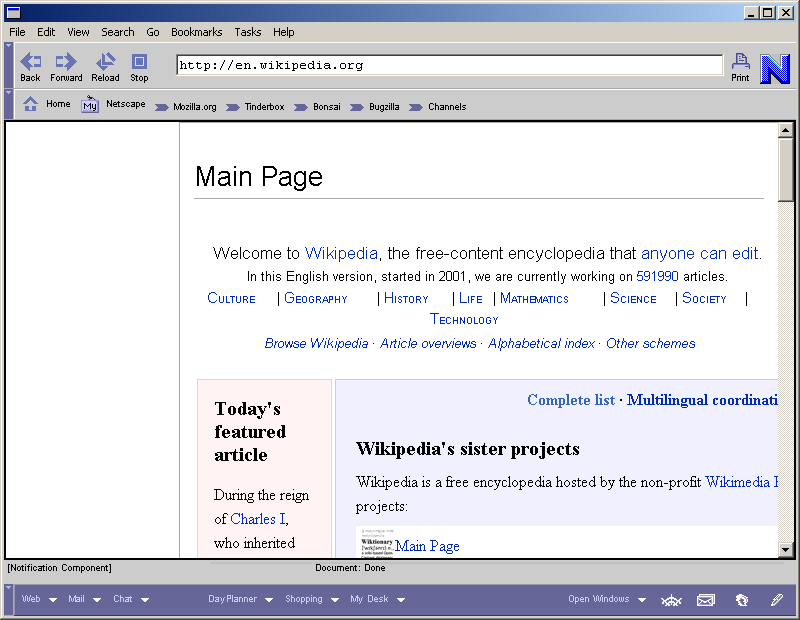
Mozilla M3

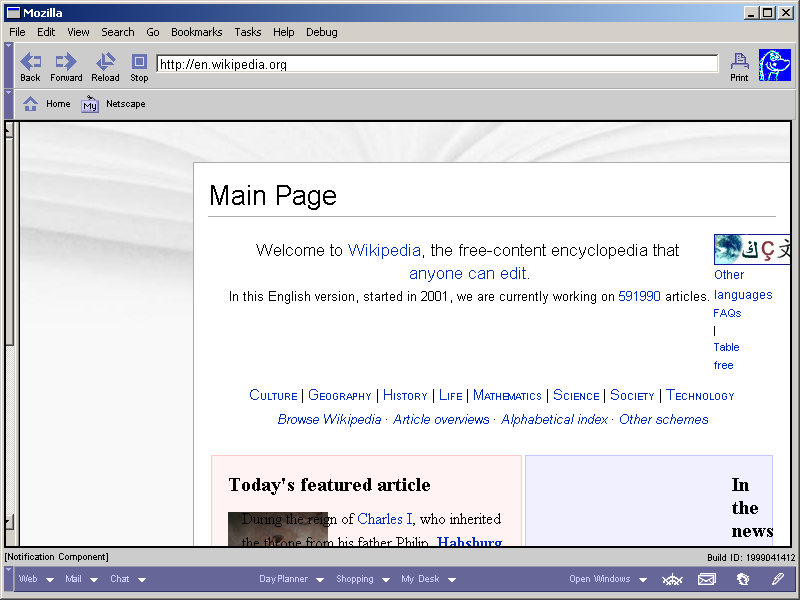
Mozilla M4

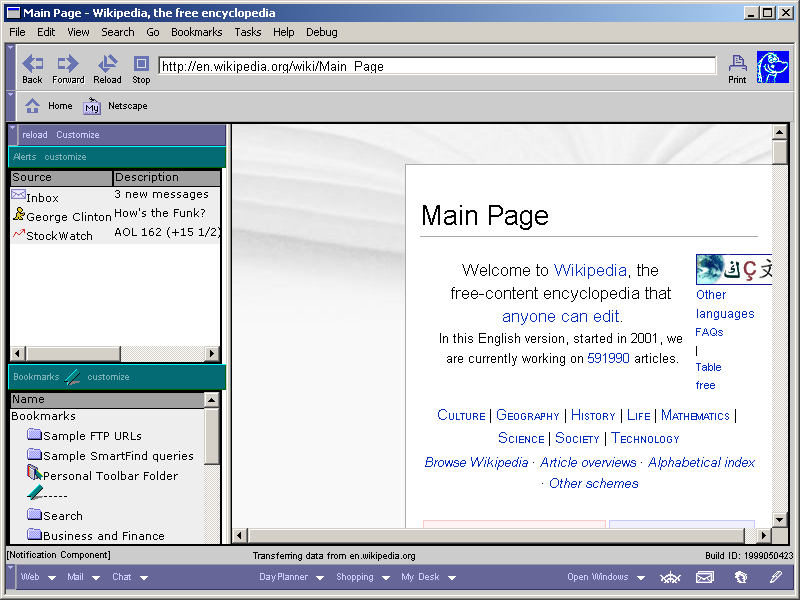
Mozilla M5

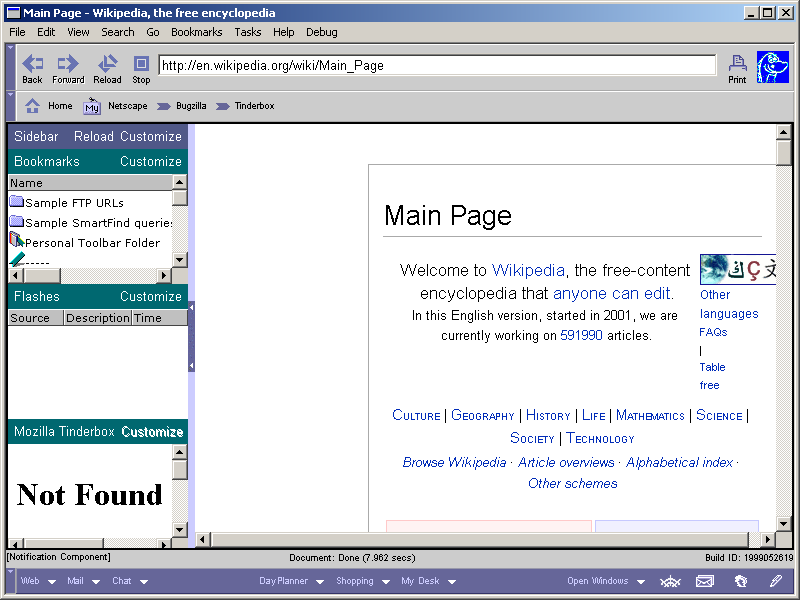
Mozilla M6

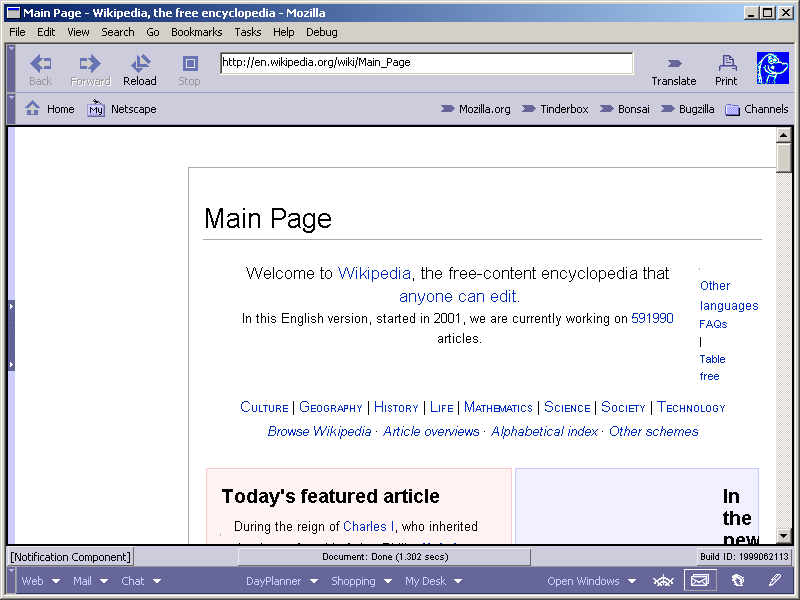
Mozilla M7

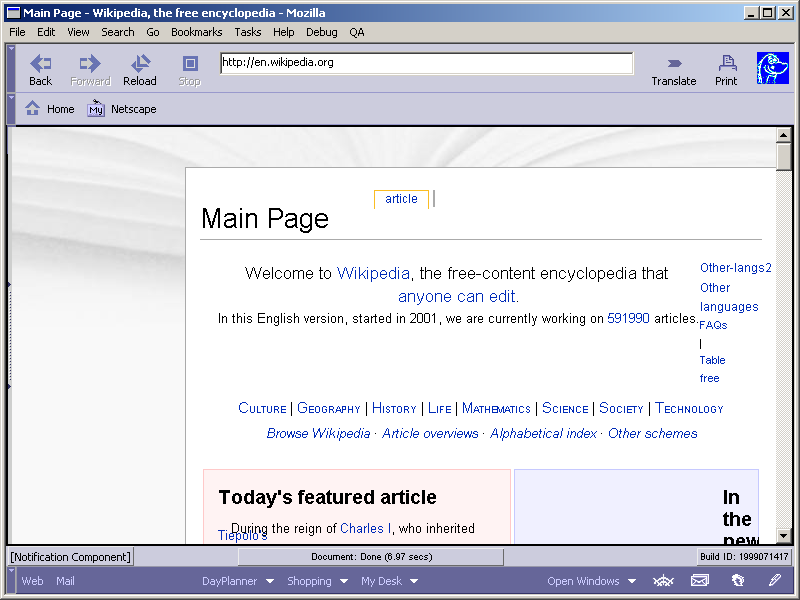
Mozilla M8

== See also ==
- Firefox version history
- History of free and open-source software
- History of Mozilla Thunderbird
- Mozilla Application Suite
- SeaMonkey
