= Project Bergamot =

Machine translation software development project

Project Bergamot is a joint project between several European universities and Mozilla for the development of machine translation software based on artificial neural networks, which is intended for local execution on end-user devices.

The software library that was created and the associated language models were made available to the general public as Free Software. Execution requires a x86 CPU with SSE4.1 instruction set extensions. In 2022, Devin Coldewey of TechCrunch judged the translation quality to be "more than adequate", but considered Firefox Translations to be not yet fully mature.

== Usage ==
Mozilla used the Bergamot Translator to expand its web browser Firefox with a feature for translating web pages, which was previously considered an important gap in Firefox' feature set. It is often compared to the much older corresponding feature in Google Chrome, which utilizes a cloud-based background service. In contrast, Firefox Translations does not require any data to leave the user's computer, resulting in advantages in terms of data protection, availability and possibly response times. There is just the installation of a new language model that needs to take place the first time a new language is encountered. Greater independence from large technology companies and their interests is also mentioned as an important advantage. Mozilla thus strengthened its position as an alternative software vendor with a particular focus on data protection and security. Mozilla followed up with the similar feature of speech recognition for spoken user input, based on whisperfile. On the other hand, slow translation times have been observed, especially on older devices. Also, Firefox Translations initially supported far fewer language pairs than other major translation services and is only gradually adding new models. On that matter, the training pipeline is also made available to interested parties to enable the creation of missing language models.

TranslateLocally is a Firefox-independent translation software based on the Bergamot Translator. It is also available as an (Electron-based) standalone application or as an extension for Chromium-based web browsers.

== History ==
Mozilla had already tried to get a (cloud-based) web content translation feature into Firefox a few years before Project Bergamot, but had failed because of the financial challenge. Microsoft had already delivered offline capabilities for its translation software in 2018. Google soon followed suit, Apple two years later. The software is based on the free translation framework Marian, which the University of Edinburgh had previously developed in cooperation with Microsoft, and is itself based on the Nematus toolkit that was presented in 2017. Under the leadership of the University of Edinburgh, a development consortium was formed with the Mozilla Corporation and the additional European universities of Prague, Sheffield and Tartu. In 2018, it was able to get 3 million euros of funding from the EU's Horizon 2020 programme. Firefox Translations was initially provided as an add-on. A first functional demonstration prototype was presented in October 2019. Beta version 117 had the feature integrated directly into the browser, the official release was in version 118 from September 2023. Both the add-on module and as part of Firefox, the code and the models are subject to the version 2 of the Mozilla Public License. Since 2022, the EU-funded HPLT project creates new language models. It involves additional partners, including the universities of Helsinki, Turku, Oslo and other partners from Spain, Norway and the Czech Republic.
