= Lemon mint =

Lemon mint is a common name for several plants and may refer to:

- Eau de Cologne mint
- Melissa officinalis
- Monarda citriodora, native to the southern United States and northern Mexico

Lemon mint might also refer to the mint lemonade drink.
