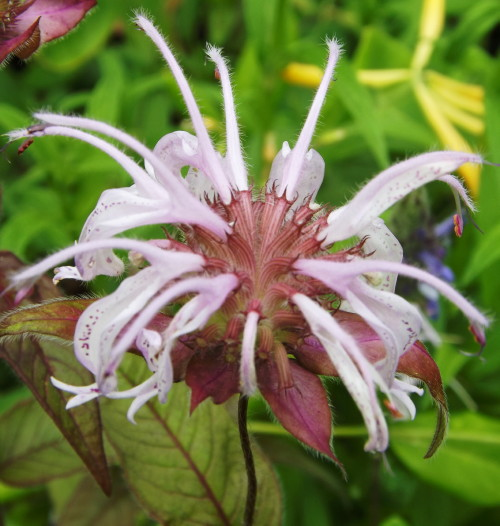

Conservation status
- Secure (NatureServe)

Scientific classification
- Kingdom: Plantae
- Clade: Tracheophytes
- Clade: Angiosperms
- Clade: Eudicots
- Clade: Asterids
- Order: Lamiales
- Family: Lamiaceae
- Genus: Monarda
- Species: M. bradburiana

Binomial name
- Monarda bradburiana Beck

= Monarda bradburiana =

Species of flowering plant

Monarda bradburiana, the eastern beebalm or Bradbury's beebalm, is a species of perennial flowering plant in the mint family, Lamiaceae, that is native to much of the southeastern United States.

== Description ==
Monarda bradburiana is a herbaceous perennial plant, growing to a height of 1 to 2 ft (30 to 60 cm). The stems are scantily branched, square and usually hairless, although new growth sometimes has a few hairs along the angles. The leaves are opposite, about 3.5 in (9 cm) long and 2 in (5 cm) wide, ovate or broadly lanceolate, with toothed margins. The lower leaves have short petioles and the upper leaves are appressed against the stem. The upper surface of the leafblades are often pubescent, yellowish-green or green, sometimes with purple spotting or tingeing at the margin. The uppermost leaves form bracts subtending the blooms. The flowerheads are about 1.5 in (4 cm) wide, cone-shaped at first and flattening out later, with the central florets opening first. The calyx of each floret is tubular and hairy, with five pointed lobes. The florets are white or pink, curved, about 1 in (2.5 cm) long, with a narrow tube and upper lip and a slightly wider lower lip speckled with purple. The flowers usually bloom in late spring and early summer. The seed is a nutlet that can be dispersed by the wind, and the plant can also spread by vegetative growth from rhizomes.

== Distribution and habitat ==
Monarda bradburiana is native to central and southeastern United States where it is found in the states of Alabama, Arkansas, Iowa, Illinois, Indiana, Kansas, Kentucky, Louisiana, Missouri, Oklahoma, Tennessee and Texas. Its typical habitat is thickets, woodland edges, grassland and roadsides.

== Ecology ==
The flowers of Monarda bradburiana produce copious quantities of nectar and are attractive to bumblebees and other long-tongued bees, butterflies, hummingbird moths, beeflies and hummingbirds. Pollen is harvested by halictid bees which cannot reach the nectar, and a specialist pollinator is Doufourea monardae, a small black bee. This is a food plant for the caterpillars of the hermit sphinx, the gray marvel, the orange mint moth and the raspberry pyrausta moth. Herbivorous mammals tend to avoid the foliage, perhaps because it has an odour of oregano.
