= Coleophora monardella =

Scientific classification
- Kingdom: Animalia
- Phylum: Arthropoda
- Class: Insecta
- Order: Lepidoptera
- Family: Coleophoridae
- Genus: Coleophora
- Species: C. monardella

Binomial name
- Coleophora monardella (McDunnough, 1933)

Synonyms
- Haploptilia monardella McDunnough, 1933

Species of moth

Coleophora monardella is a moth of the family Coleophoridae. It is found in North America, including Iowa and Ontario.

The larvae feed on the leaves of Monarda species, including Monarda fistulosa. They create an annulate case.

== See also ==
- List of moths of Canada
