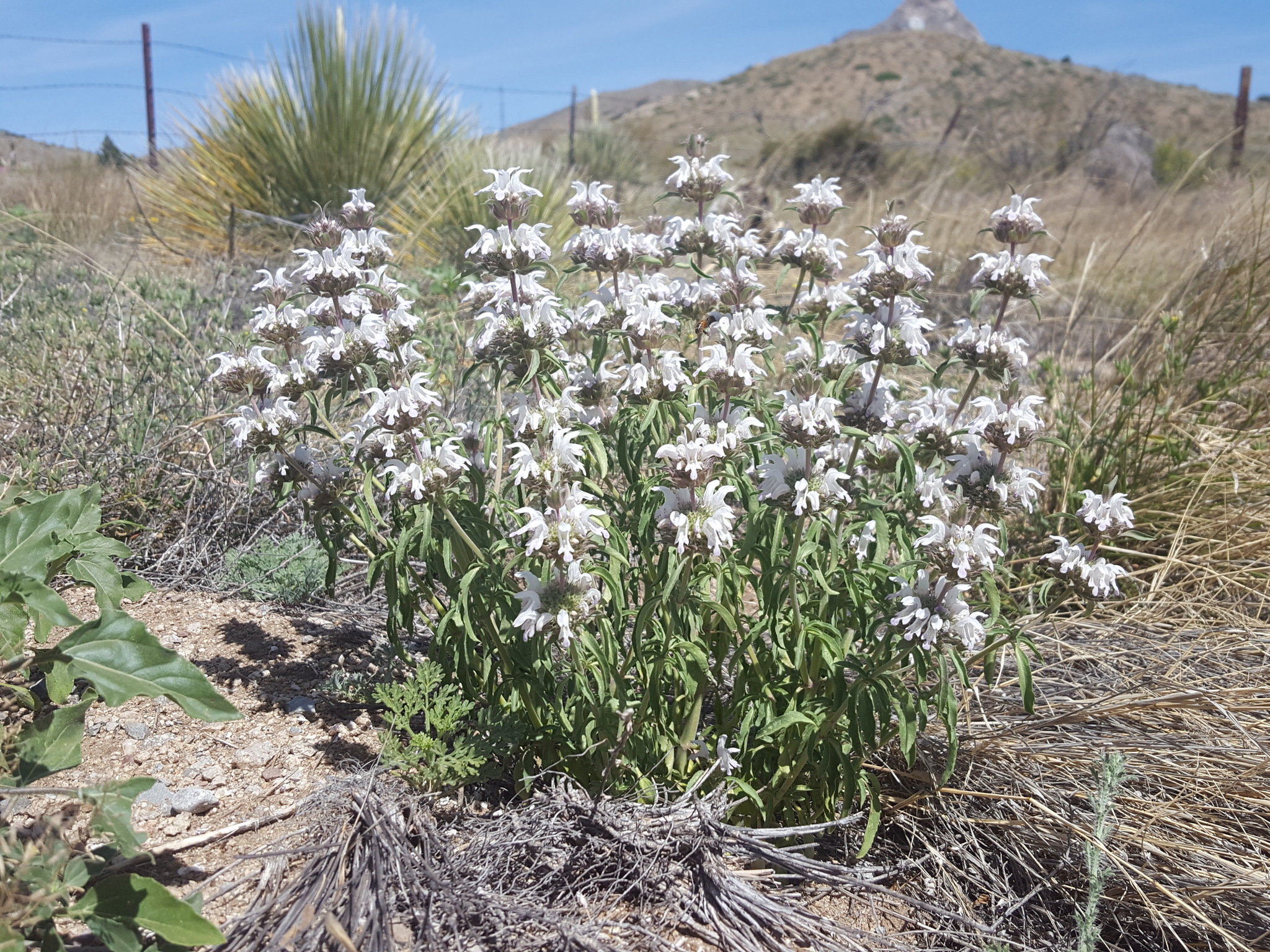

Scientific classification
- Kingdom: Plantae
- Clade: Tracheophytes
- Clade: Angiosperms
- Clade: Eudicots
- Clade: Asterids
- Order: Lamiales
- Family: Lamiaceae
- Genus: Monarda
- Species: M. pectinata

Binomial name
- Monarda pectinata Nutt.

= Monarda pectinata =

Species of flowering plant

Monarda pectinata is a species of flowering plant in the mint family (Lamiaceae) known commonly as plains beebalm or pony beebalm. The species is native to much of the southwestern and central United States and grows in a range of open, dry habitats. It is an annual herb and is recognized by its axillary clusters of two-lipped corollas and characteristic bracts. The species is accepted as valid by Plants of the World Online.

== Description ==
Monarda pectinata is an annual herb that typically reaches about 15–40 cm in height with opposite leaves and square stems, characteristic of much of the mint family. The flowers are arranged in dense, rounded clusters along the stem nodes, subtended by leaf-like bracts with bristle-tipped margins. Corolla colors range from white to pale pink or violet, and the lower lip often shows spotting patterns.

== Distribution and habitat ==
The native range of Monarda pectinata extends across the southwestern and central United States, including Arizona, California, Colorado, Kansas, Nebraska, New Mexico, Oklahoma, South Dakota, Texas, and Utah. It grows in a variety of open habitats, including plains, desert grasslands, pinyon-juniper woodland, ponderosa woodlands, rocky soils, and roadsides at elevations roughly from 500 to over 2500 meters (1,600–8,300 feet).

== Ecology ==
As with other bee balms, Monarda pectinata is known to attract insect pollinators through its nectar-producing flowers. The plant blooms primarily from May through September in much of its range.

== Taxonomy ==
The species was first described by Thomas Nuttall in 1848 in the Proceedings of the Academy of Natural Sciences of Philadelphia. Synonyms include Monarda citriodora var. pectinata (Nutt.) Allred, reflecting historical treatments as a variety of M. citriodora, though POWO and many regional floras accept M. pectinata at species rank.

== Gallery ==
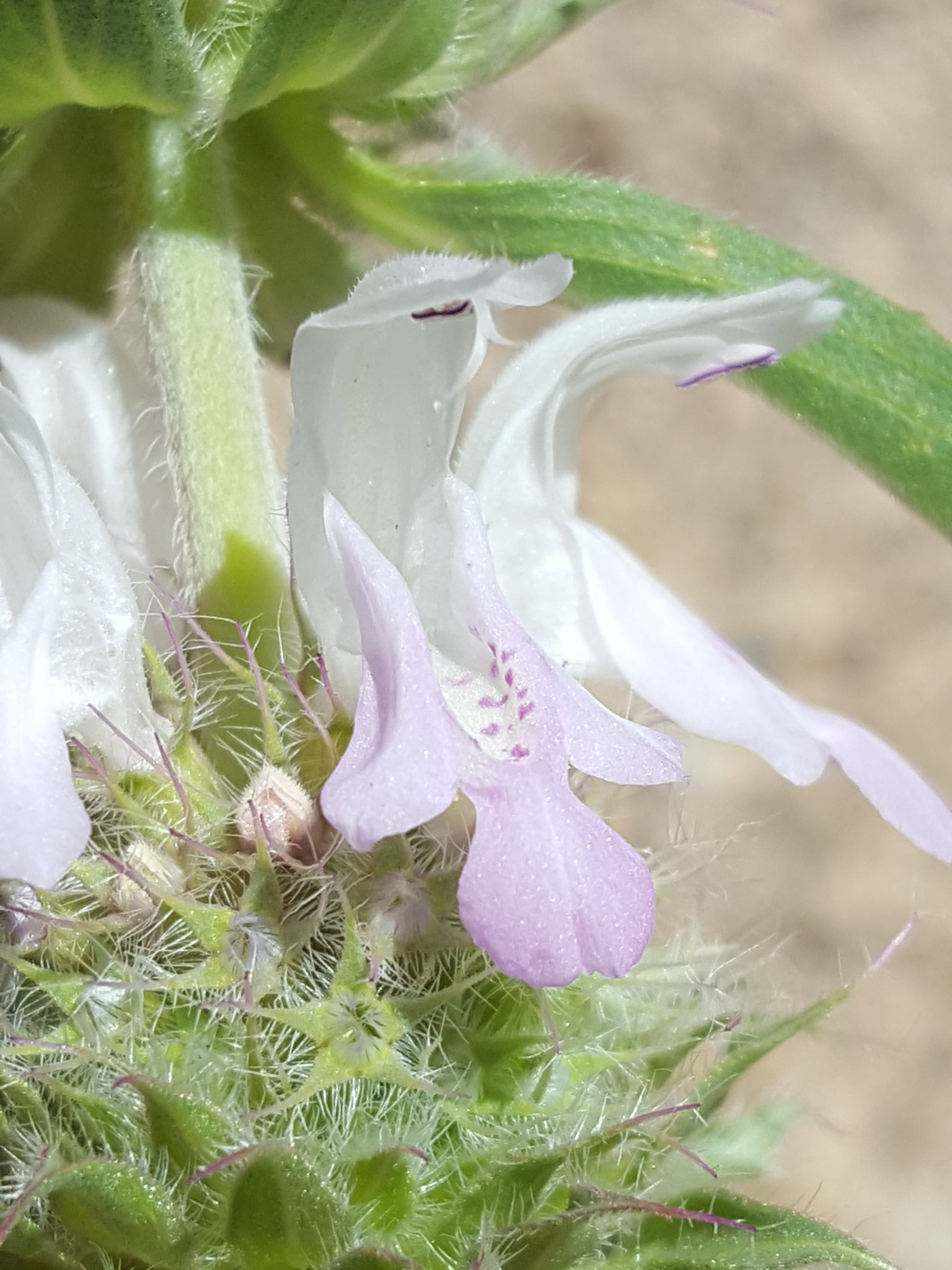
Corolla

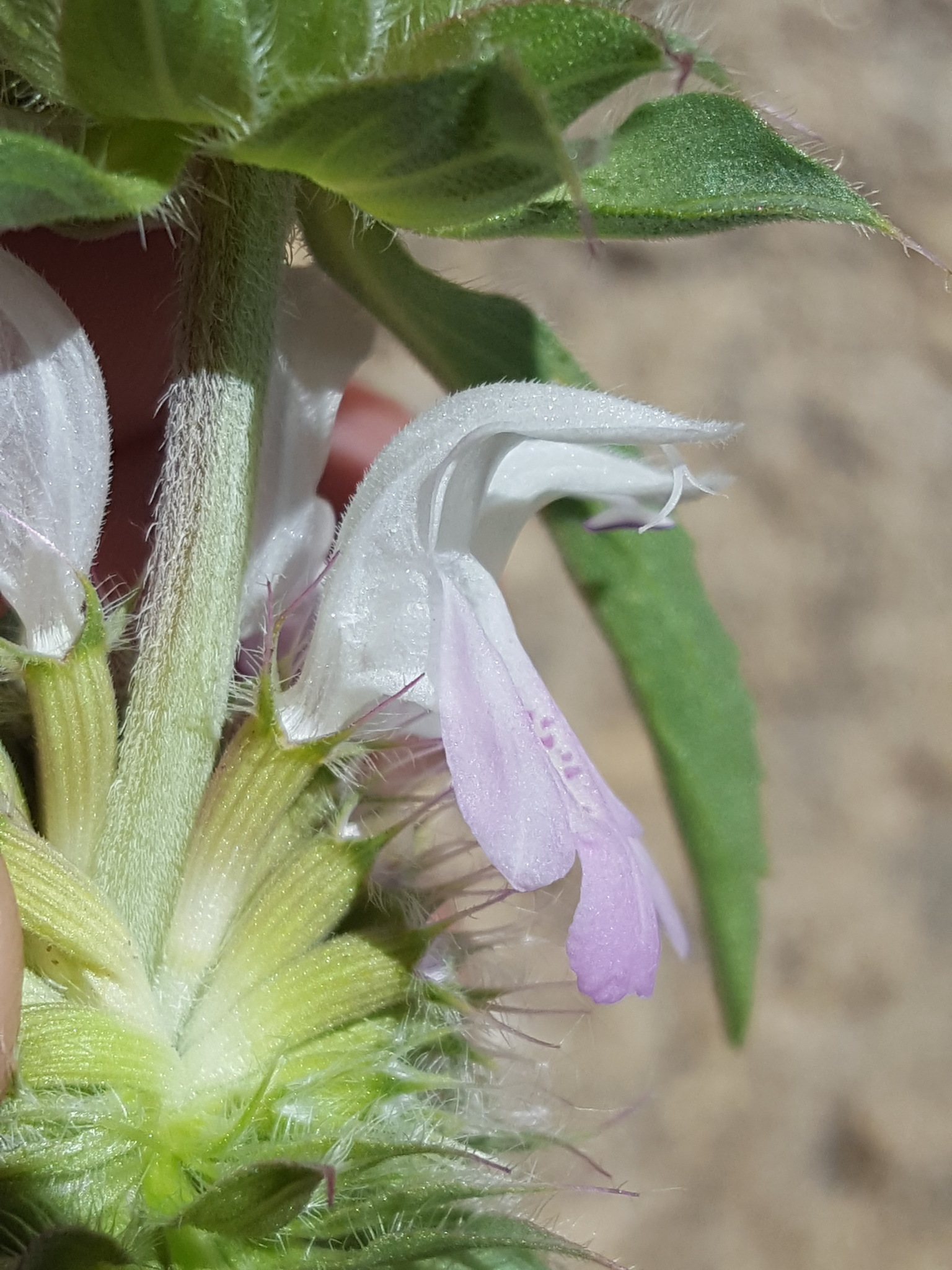
Calyx and corolla

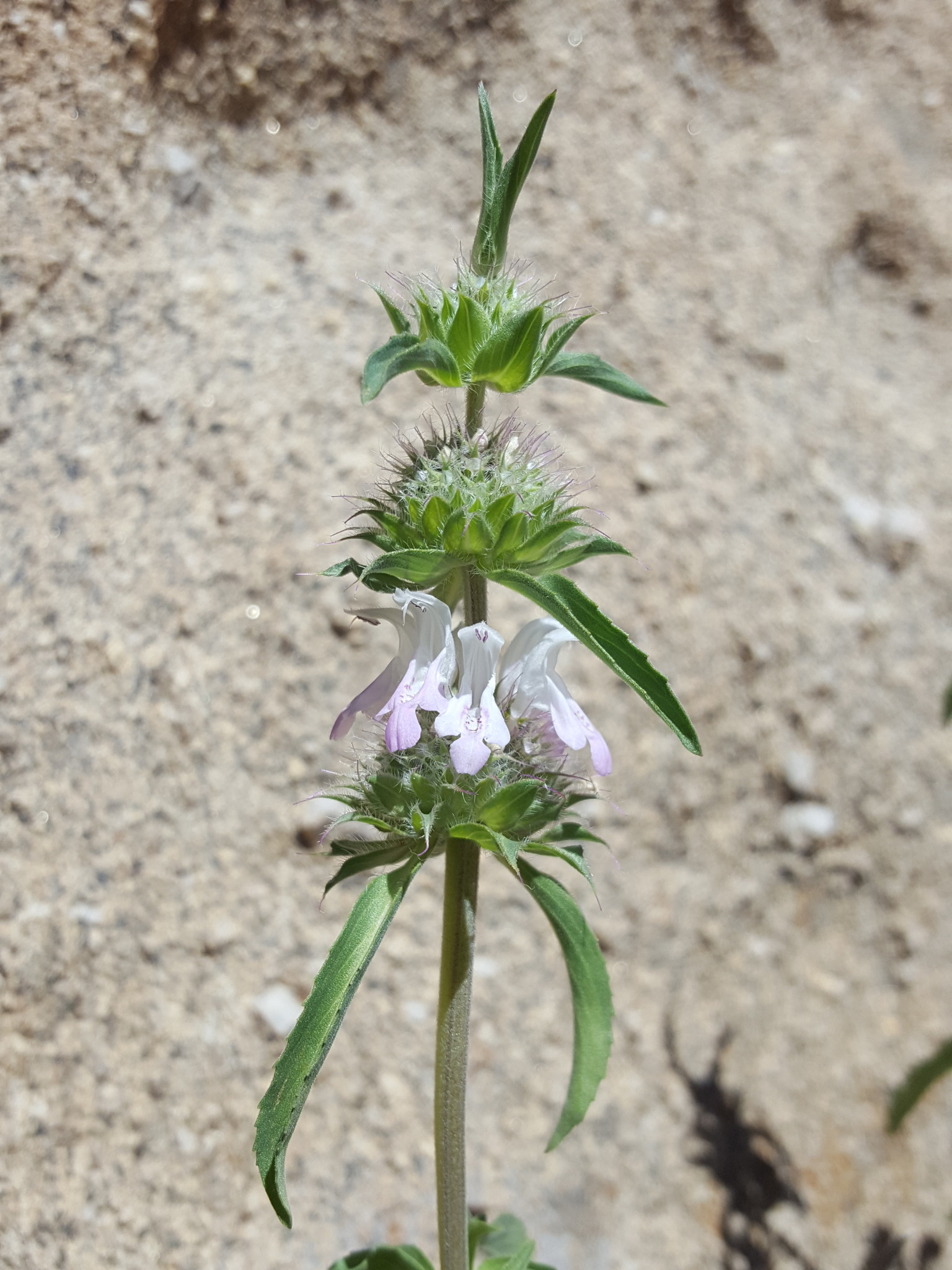
Young inflorescence

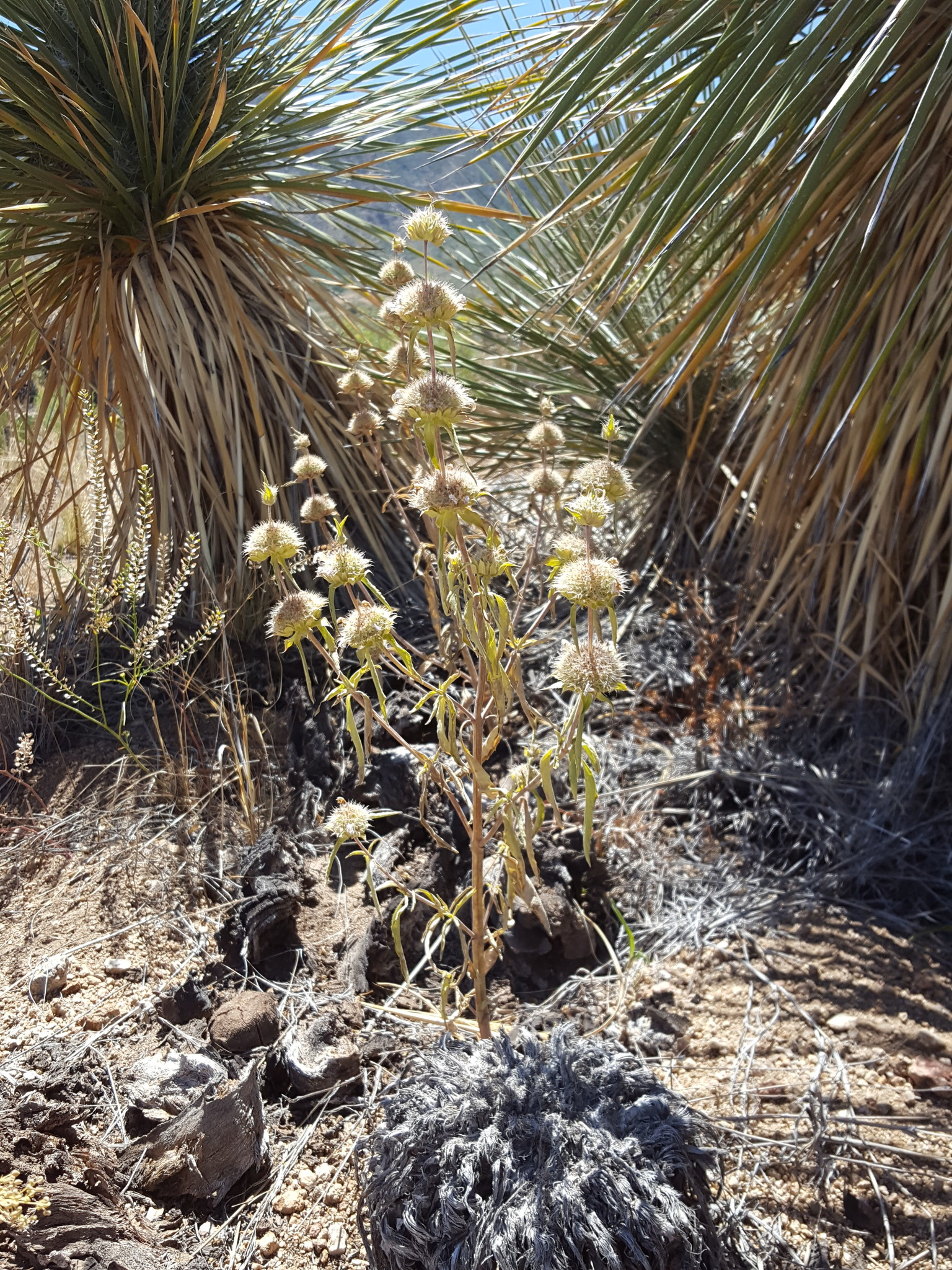
Plant in fruit
