= Bergamot mint =

Bergamot mint may refer to either of two fragrant herbs in the mint family, Lamiaceae:

- Eau de Cologne mint, probably a cultivar of Mentha aquatica
- Monarda didyma, an aromatic herb native to North America
