= Henbit =

Henbit may refer to:

- Any of several plant species with the common name "henbit":
  - Lamium amplexicaule, wild flower known as henbit dead-nettle, common henbit, or greater henbit
  - Lamium album, white henbit or archangel
  - Lamium confertum, garden henbit
  - Lamium galeobdolon, yellow henbit or yellow archangel
  - Lamium maculatum, spotted henbit
  - Lamium purpureum, red henbit or red dead-nettle
  - Monarda russeliana, Russells henbit or redpurple beebalm
  - Plagiobothrys lamprocarpus, shinyfruit popcornflower, less commonly known as henbit dead-nettle
  - Veronica hederifolia, small henbit or ivy-leaved speedwell
- Henbit (horse) (1977–1997), racehorse
