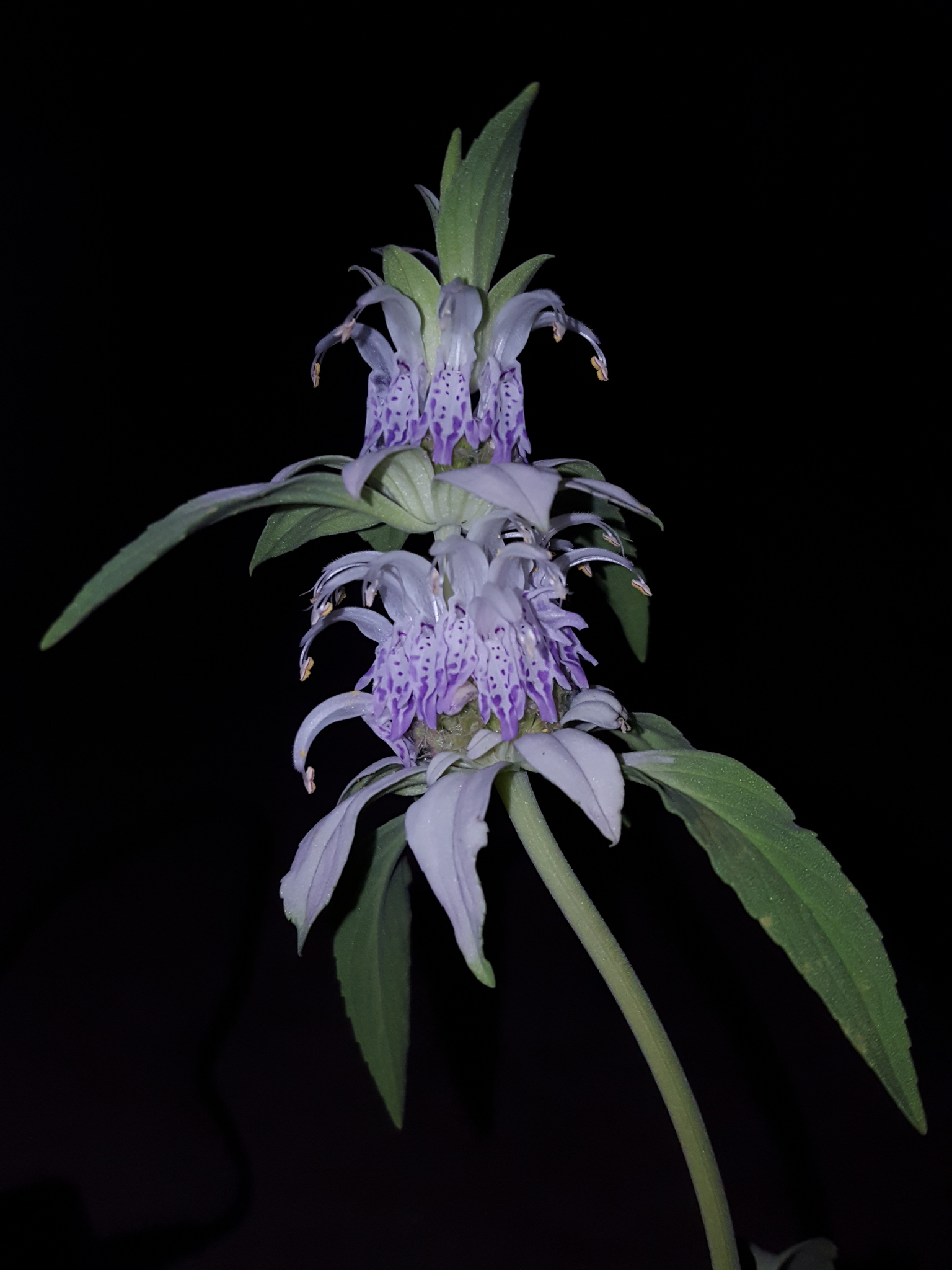

Scientific classification
- Kingdom: Plantae
- Clade: Tracheophytes
- Clade: Angiosperms
- Clade: Eudicots
- Clade: Asterids
- Order: Lamiales
- Family: Lamiaceae
- Genus: Monarda
- Species: M. humilis

Binomial name
- Monarda humilis (Torr.) Prather & J.A.Keith

= Monarda humilis =

Species of plant

Monarda humilis is a species of flowering plant in the mint family (Lamiaceae). It is a small, aromatic herb native to the southwestern United States, where it occurs in dry, open habitats. The species was historically treated as a variety of Monarda punctata and was elevated to species rank in the early 21st century following taxonomic revision.

== Description ==
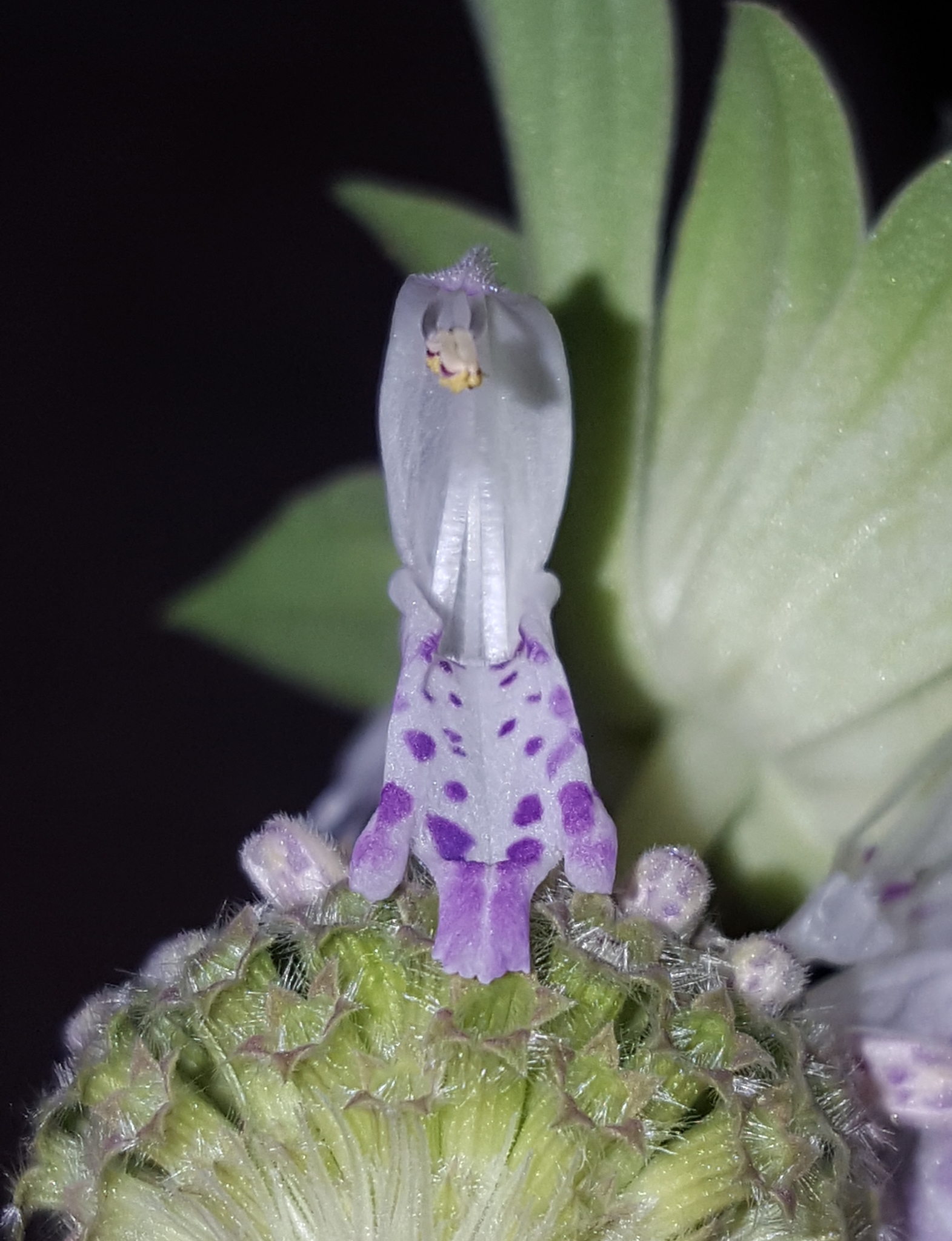
Corolla with maroon-purple spots

Monarda humilis is a small, aromatic herb that is usually annual and rarely branched near the base. Plants are slender and typically reach 15–40 cm in height, occasionally up to 50 cm. Stems are often tinged pink to purple, especially near the base, and are covered with very fine hairs.

The leaves are opposite, narrow to elliptic, and relatively small compared to related species, generally 2–4 cm long (sometimes up to 5 cm). Leaf margins are usually entire, though they may be weakly toothed in some individuals.

Flowers are arranged in whorls along the stem, with floral bracts that are often purple on their upper surface. The tubular flowers are predominantly white, with distinctive deep purple spotting and margins on the lower lip and a purple upper lip. The dried upper corolla lip is lavender to purple and unspotted, a feature unique within its taxonomic section. The calyx bears a ring of multicellular hairs on its inner surface near the opening. Flowering typically occurs from June through August.

== Distribution and habitat ==
Monarda humilis is native to the southwestern United States and is known primarily from central and western New Mexico. It occurs in open, dry habitats, including sandy soils in grasslands, dunes, and open shrublands such as juniper scrub. The species is adapted to arid and semi-arid environments and is most often found in exposed sites rather than shaded or densely vegetated areas.

== Taxonomy ==
The taxon was originally described in 1853 by John Torrey as Monarda punctata var. humilis. It was elevated to species rank based on consistent differences in plant size, leaf morphology, flower coloration, and overall growth habit when compared with Monarda punctata.

Monarda humilis is generally smaller and more slender than M. punctata, with smaller leaves and more extensive purple pigmentation in the stems, bracts, calyx, and corollas. These morphological differences, together with cytological evidence, support its recognition as a distinct species. Monarda humilis has a chromosome number of n = 12, which differs from many closely related taxa in the same group. The species was formally recombined and recognized at species rank in 2003.
