= Chionodes fondella =

Scientific classification
- Kingdom: Animalia
- Phylum: Arthropoda
- Clade: Pancrustacea
- Class: Insecta
- Order: Lepidoptera
- Family: Gelechiidae
- Genus: Chionodes
- Species: C. fondella

Binomial name
- Chionodes fondella (Busck, 1906)

Synonyms
- Gelechia fondella Busck, 1906

Species of moth

Chionodes fondella is a moth in the family Gelechiidae. It is found in North America, where it has been recorded from Nova Scotia to southern Manitoba, Montana, Colorado, Oklahoma, North Carolina and Pennsylvania.

The wingspan is 13–14 mm. The forewings are whitish ochreous, with each scale darker at the tip, and with a faint roseate tinge. There are two large conspicuous black costal spots, one at the basal third outwardly oblique, and the other at the apical third inwardly oblique, both reaching the middle of the wing. The extreme apical part of the wing is dusted with black. The hindwings are light ochreous fuscous.

The larvae feed on Antennaria, Anaphilis and Gnaphalium species, as well as Monarda fistulosa.
