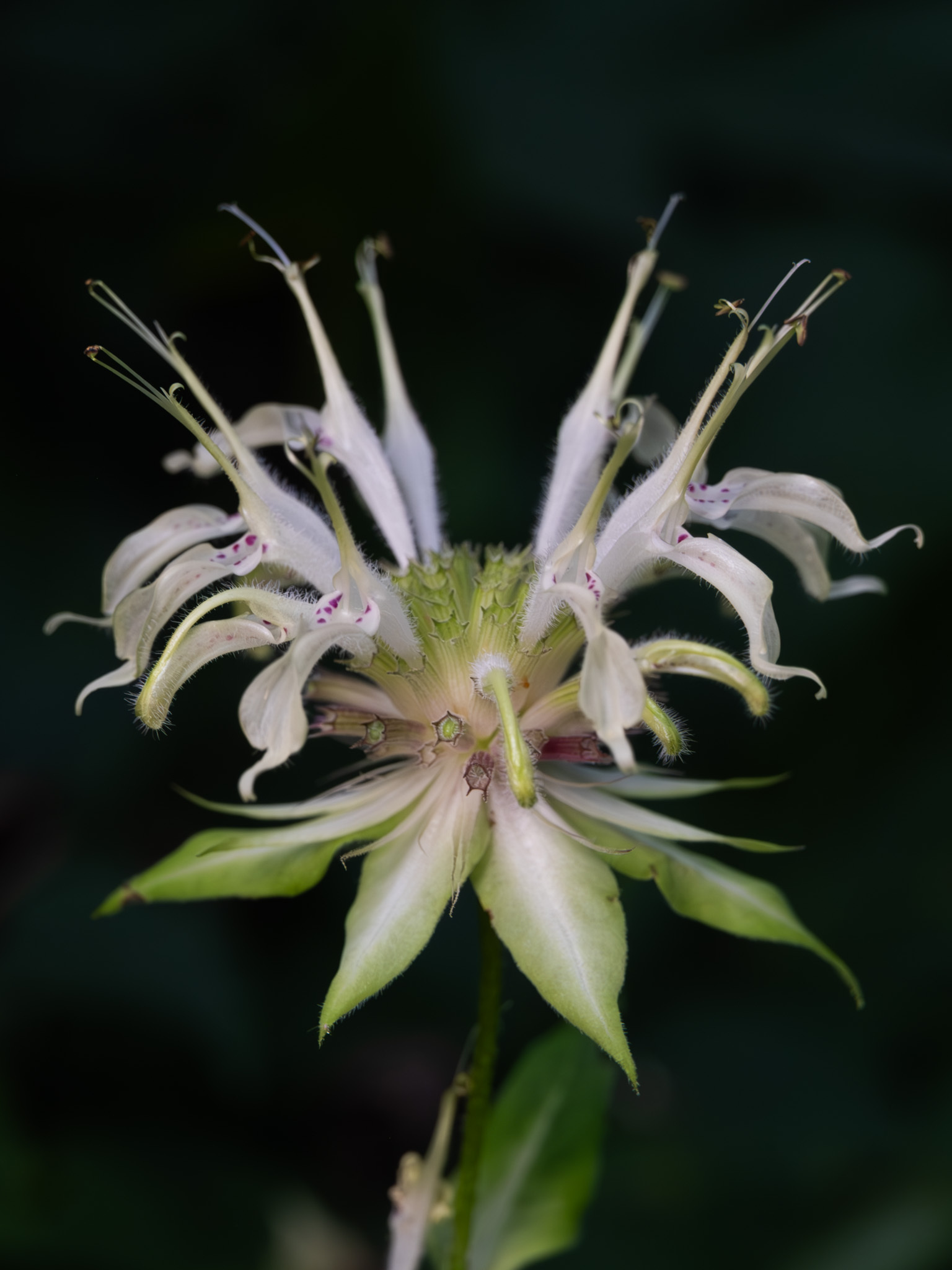
- Monarda clinopodia flowering in Shenandoah National Park, Virginia, USA.

Scientific classification
- Kingdom: Plantae
- Clade: Tracheophytes
- Clade: Angiosperms
- Clade: Eudicots
- Clade: Asterids
- Order: Lamiales
- Family: Lamiaceae
- Genus: Monarda
- Species: M. clinopodia

Binomial name
- Monarda clinopodia L.

= Monarda clinopodia =

Species of flowering plant

Monarda clinopodia, commonly known as white bergamot, basil bee balm or white bee balm, is a perennial wildflower in the mint family, Lamiaceae. This species is native to North America, ranging north from New York, west to Missouri, and south to Georgia and Alabama. M. clinopodia has also been introduced into Vermont and Massachusetts.

== Description ==
Monarda clinopodia is a perennial herb, growing 1 to 2 m (3 ft 3 in to 6 ft 7 in) in height. Leaves are simple and opposite. Leaf margins have teeth. Leafy bracts white or white-tinged. Corolla is white, dark-spotted, 1.5 – 3 cm long. Flowers are bilateral.

It grows in moist woods, thickets, ravines, and stream-banks. Flowers late June to early September. The plant attracts bees, bumblebees, butterflies, and hummingbirds.

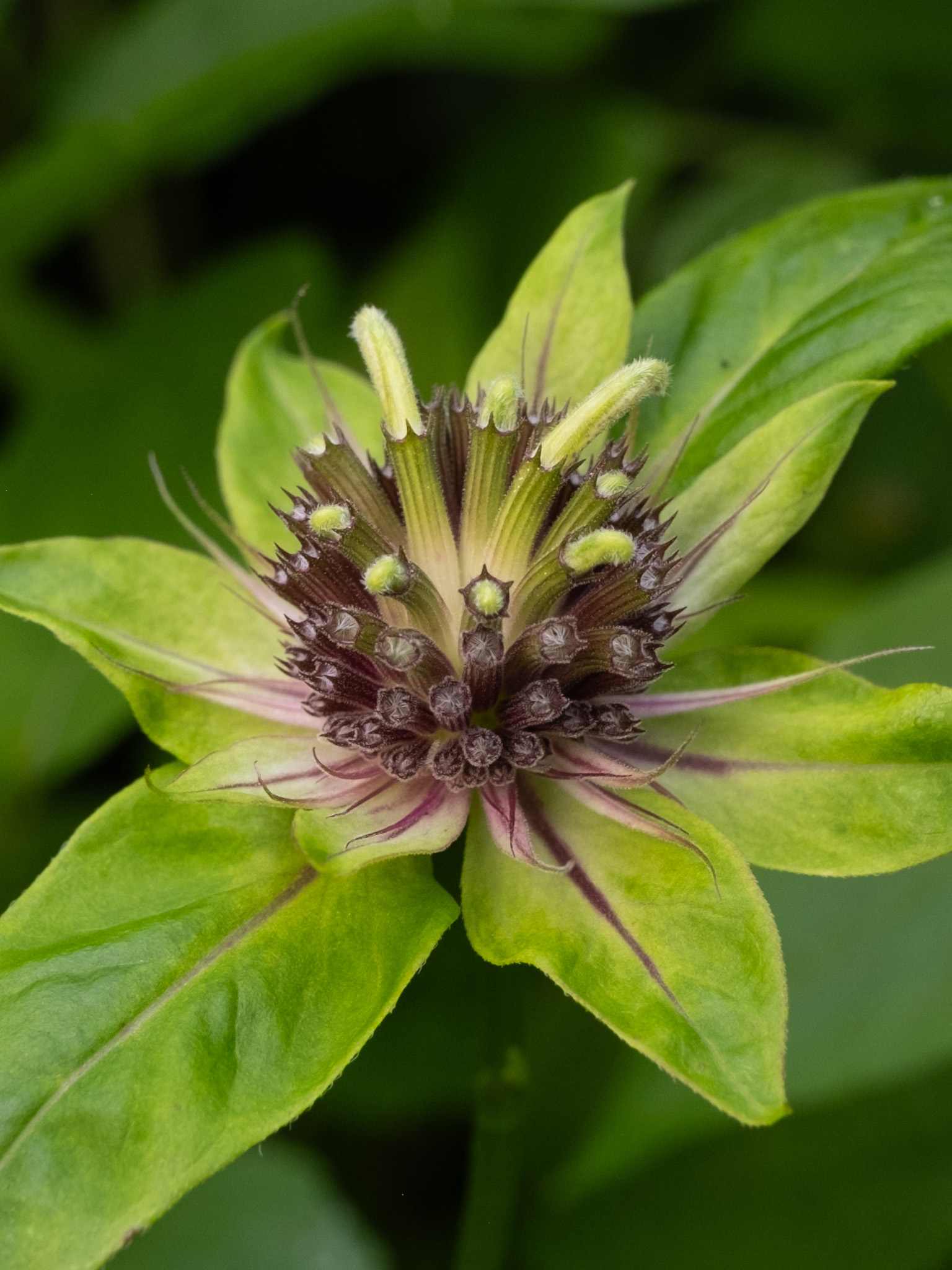
Budding inflorescence

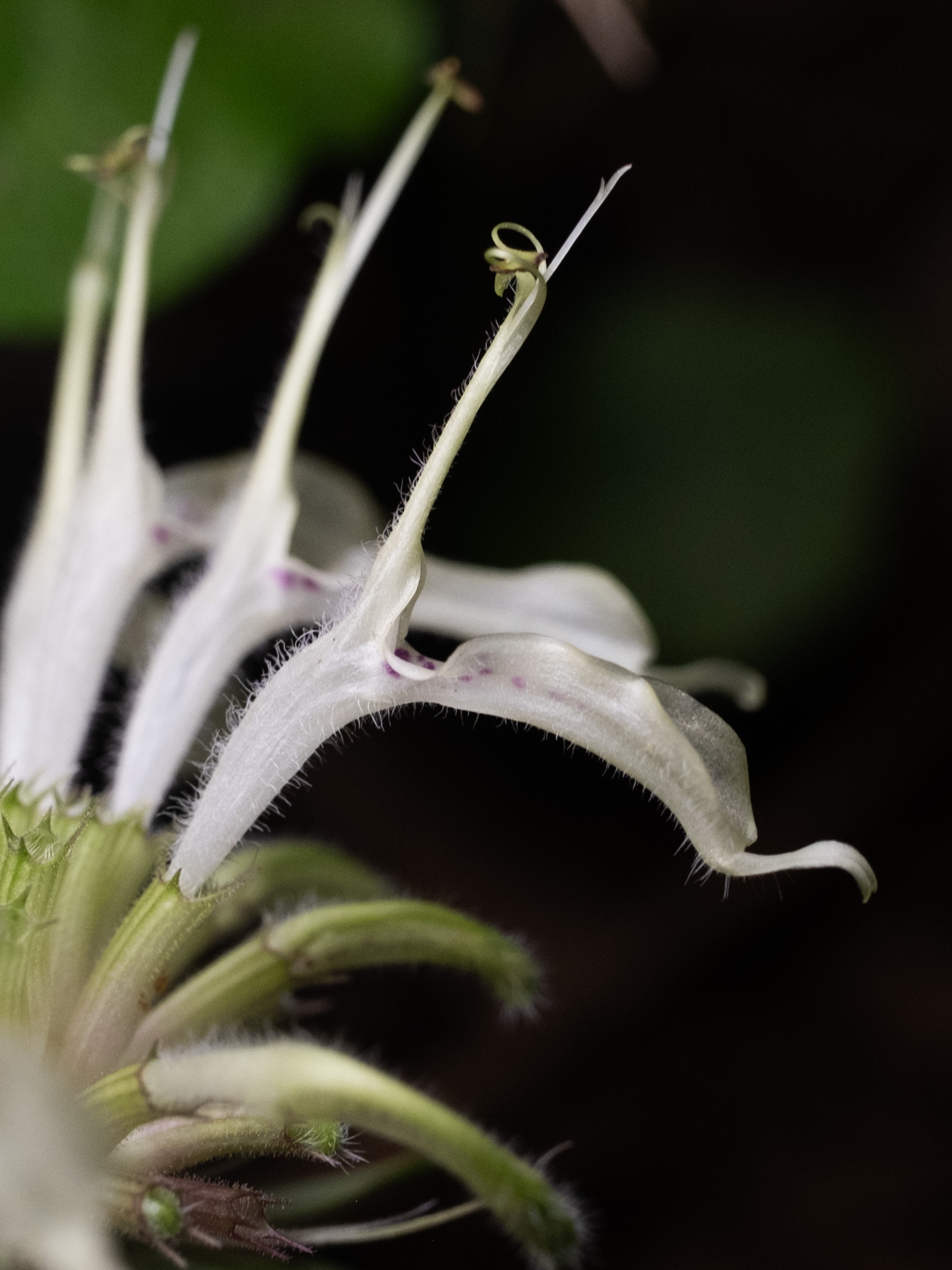
Corolla and calyx

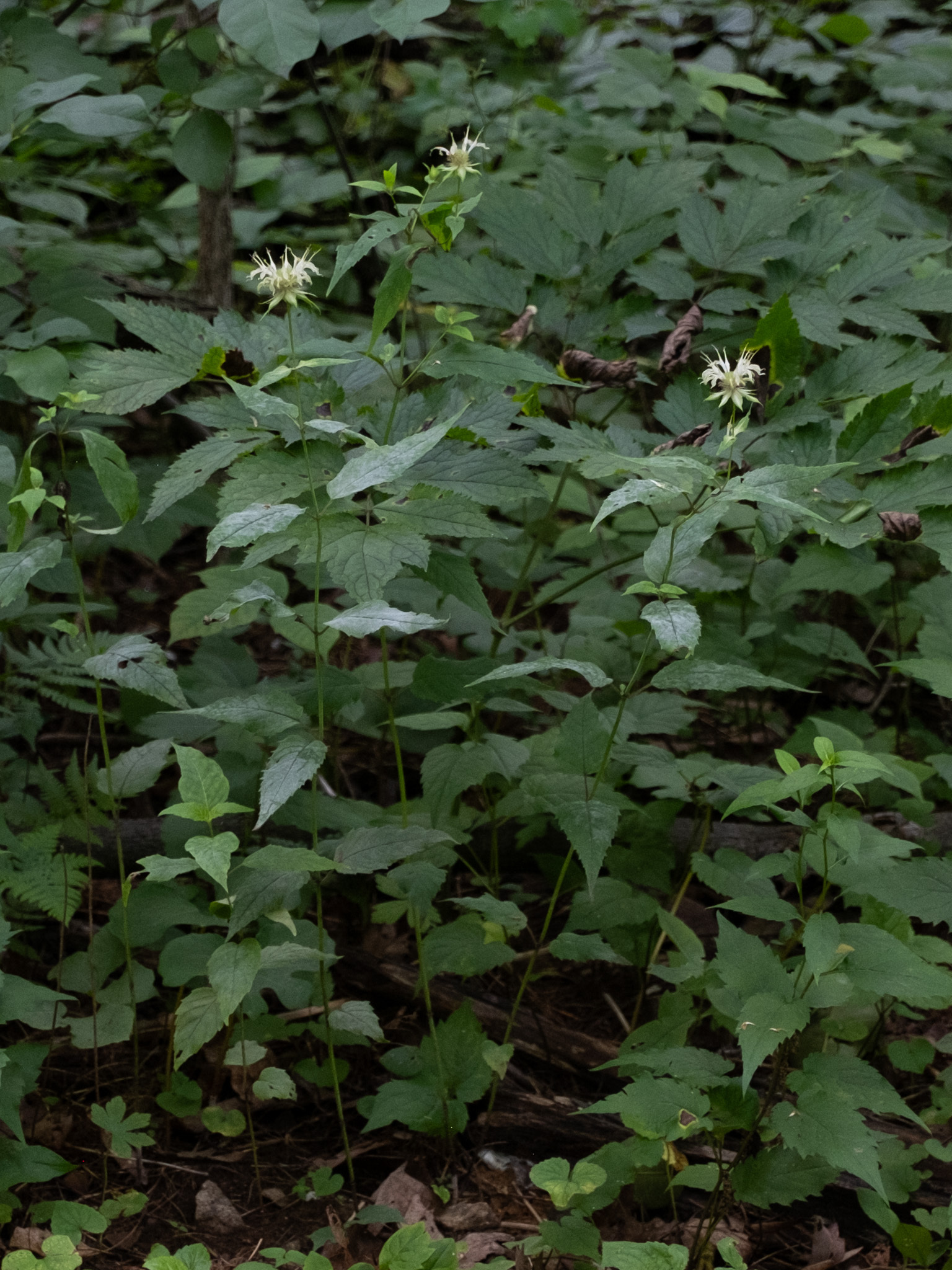

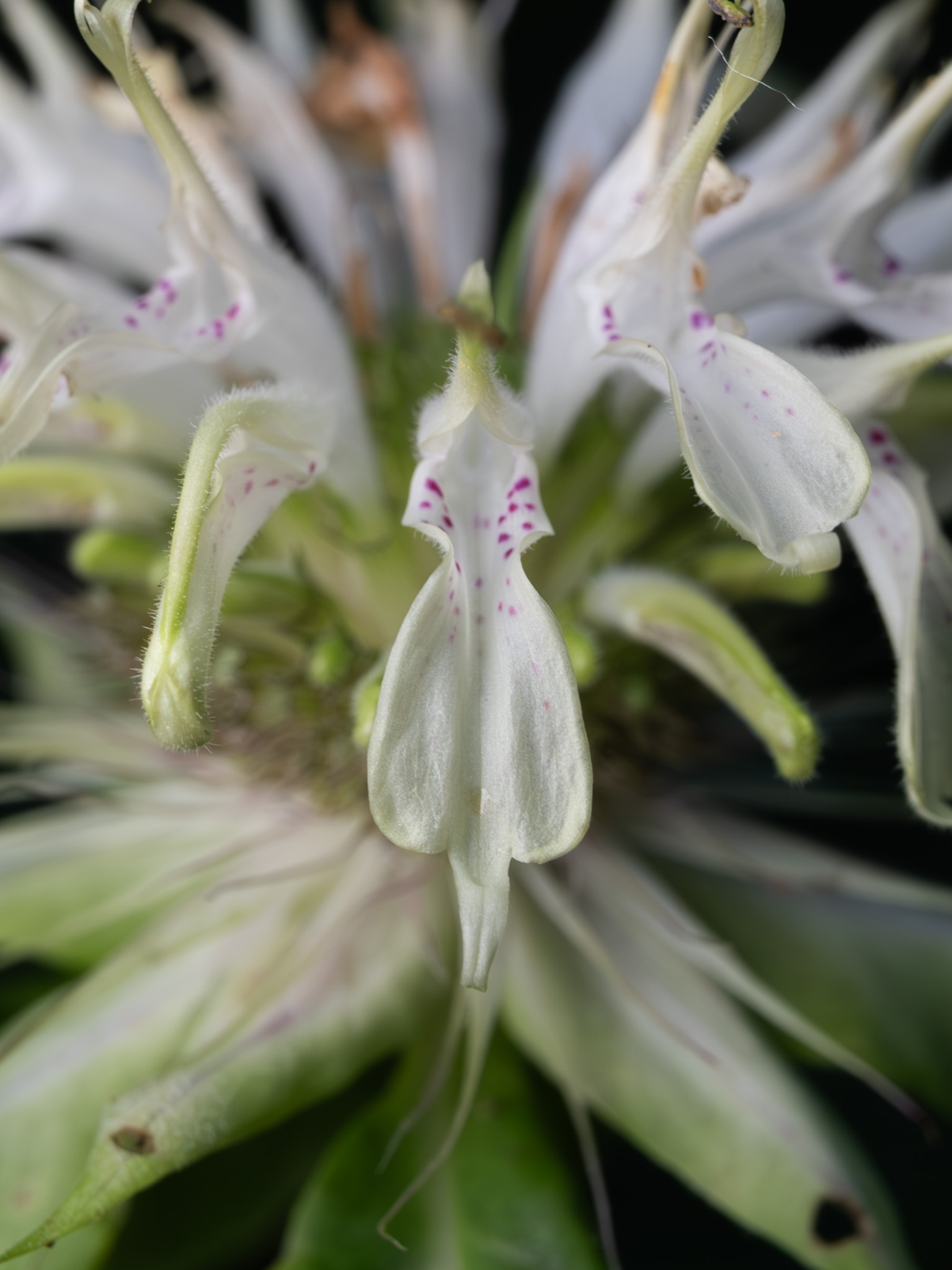
Corolla spotting

== Biology & Ecology ==
M. clinopodia typically grows in moist woods, thickets, ravines, and stream-banks and may also appear along roadsides.
