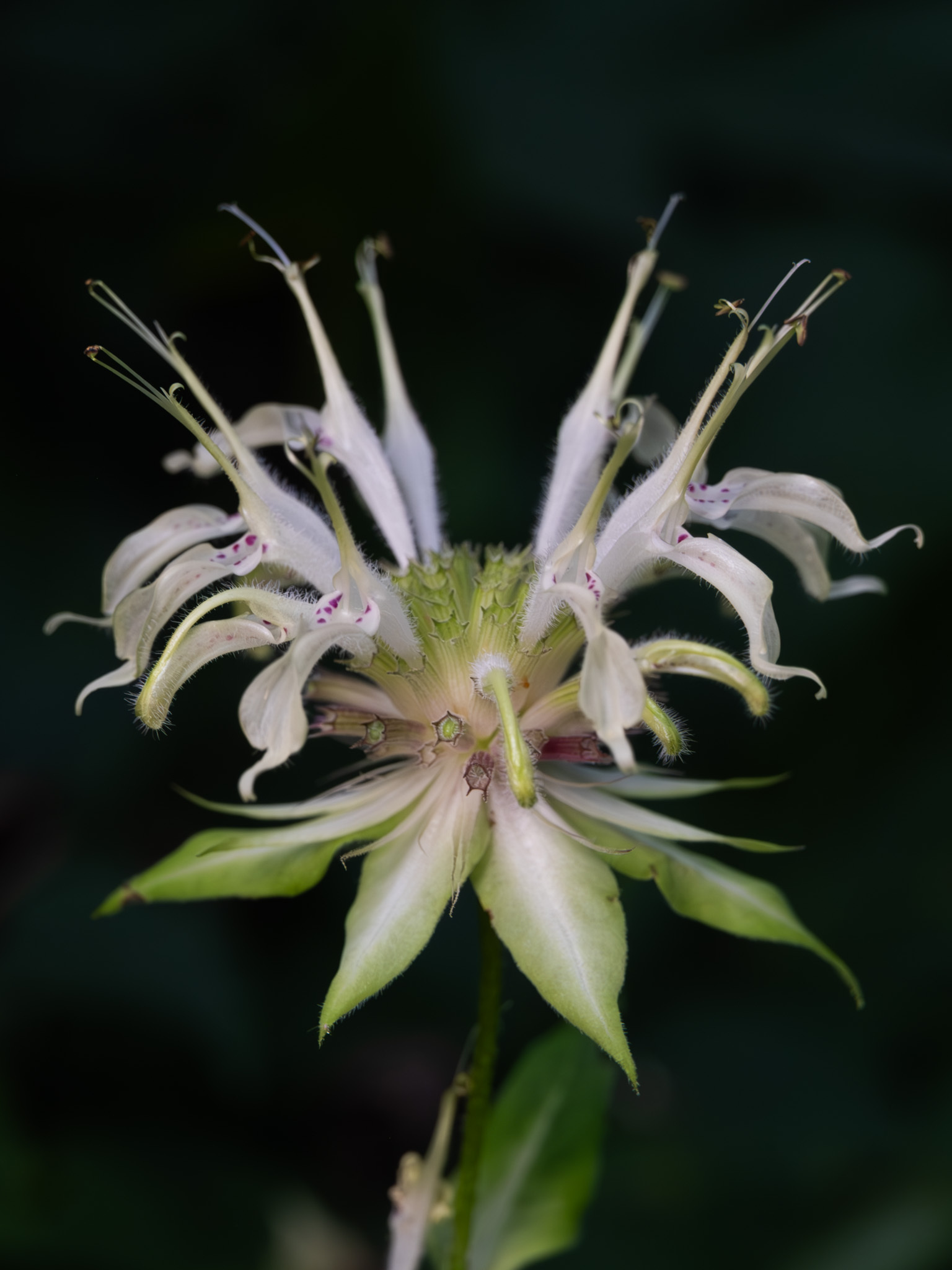
- Monarda clinopodia

Scientific classification
- Kingdom: Plantae
- Clade: Tracheophytes
- Clade: Angiosperms
- Clade: Eudicots
- Clade: Asterids
- Order: Lamiales
- Family: Lamiaceae
- Subfamily: Nepetoideae
- Tribe: Mentheae
- Genus: Monarda; L.

Type species
- Monarda fistulosa L.

Synonyms
- Cheilyctis Benth.; Cheilyctis (Raf.) Spach

= Monarda =

Genus of flowering plants

Monarda is a genus of flowering plants in the mint family, Lamiaceae. The genus is endemic to North America. Common names include bergamot, bee balm, horsemint, and oswego tea, the first being inspired by the fragrance of the leaves, which is reminiscent of bergamot orange (Citrus bergamia). The genus was named for the Spanish botanist Nicolás Monardes, who wrote a book in 1574 describing plants of the New World.

== Description ==
Monarda species include annual and perennial herbaceous plants. They grow erect to heights of 20–90 cm (8–35 in). The slender, serrated, lanceolate leaves are oppositely arranged on the square stem, hairless or sparsely hairy, and about 7–14 cm (2.8–5.5 in) long.

The flowers are tubular and bilaterally symmetric, with a narrow upper lip and a wider lower lip. The wild flowers are single, but some cultivated forms have double flowers. They are monoecious, with male and female structures in each flower. There are two stamens. Inflorescences occur at the top of the stem or emerge from the axils. They are typically crowded head-like clusters of flowers with leafy bracts. Flower color varies, with wild species bearing red, pink, and light purple flowers. M. didyma has bright carmine red flowers, M. fistulosa has pink, and M. citriodora and M. pectinata have pale purple. Hybrids occur in the wild, and they are common in cultivation. Seed collected from hybrids does not yield plants identical to the parent.

== Uses ==
The crushed leaves of all species exude a spicy, fragrant essential oil. Of the species examined in one study, M. didyma contained the highest concentration of oil.

Several species, including Monarda fistulosa and M. didyma, have a long history of use as medicinal plants by many Native Americans, such as the Blackfoot, Menominee, Ojibwa and Winnebago. The Blackfoot recognized the strong antiseptic action of the plants, and used them in poultices for skin infections and minor wounds. Native Americans and later settlers also used it to alleviate stomach and bronchial ailments. A tisane made from the plant was also used to treat mouth and throat infections caused by dental caries and gingivitis. Bee balm is a natural source of the antiseptic compound thymol, the primary active ingredient in some modern commercial mouthwash formulas. The Winnebago used a bee balm tisane as a general stimulant. Bee balm was also used as a carminative herb by Native Americans to prevent excessive flatulence.

Although somewhat bitter due to the thymol content in the leaves and buds, the plant tastes like a mix of spearmint and peppermint with oregano. Bee balm was traditionally used by Native Americans as a seasoning for wild game, particularly birds. The plants are widespread across North America and can be found in moist meadows, hillsides, and forest clearings up to 5,000 feet (1,500 m) in elevation.

== Cultivation ==
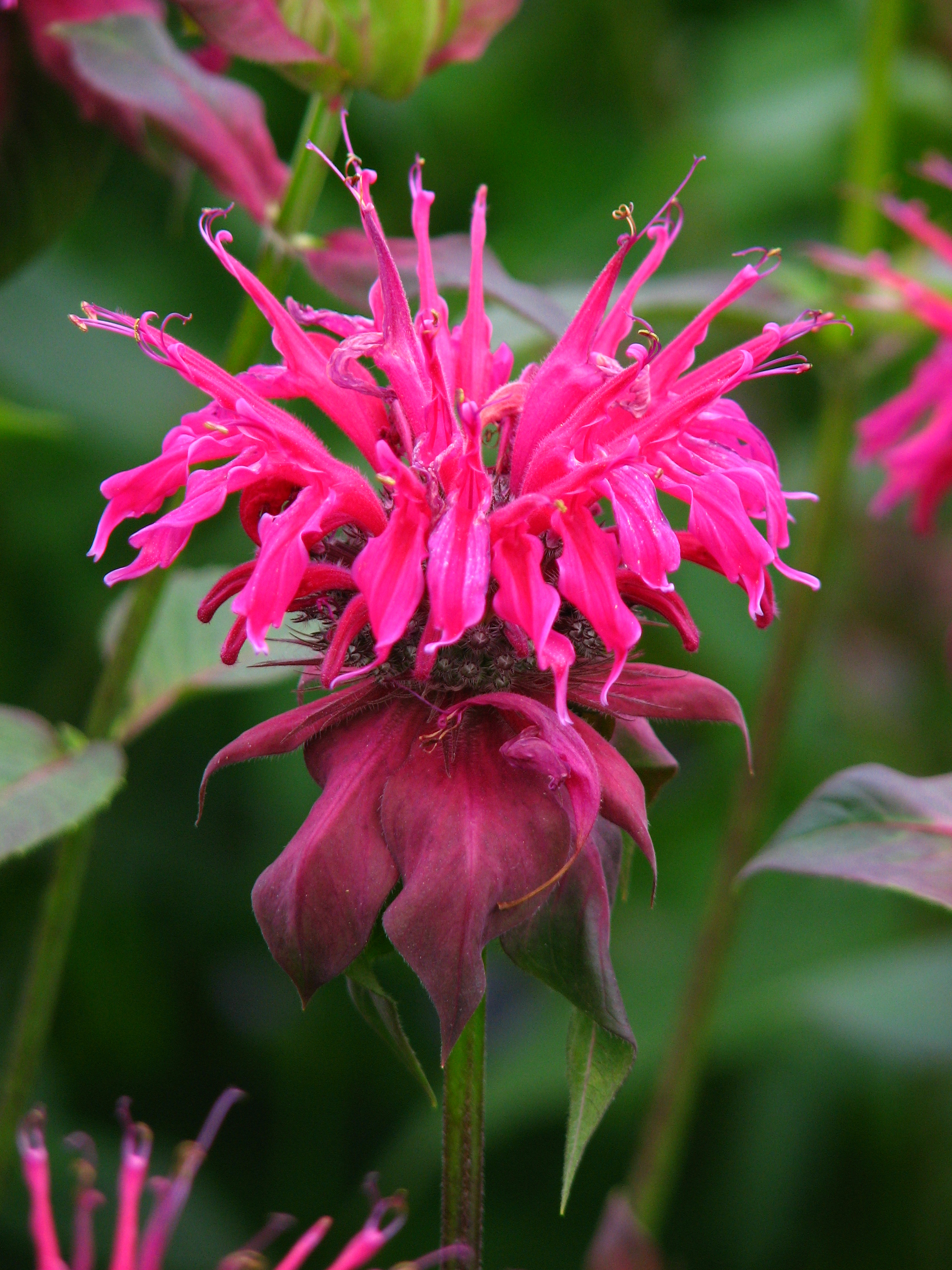
Cultivar Monarda 'Panorama'

Monarda plants thrive in sun and moist but well-drained soil. Plants growing in partial shade spread horizontally and produce fewer flowers. Monarda are used in beds and borders to attract hummingbirds, pollinating insects, and insects that control garden pests. They are prone to developing powdery mildew in high humidity, especially if planted in a place without good air circulation.

Hybrid cultivars range from dark red mahogany to bluish lilac to multiple shades of pink. These are generally not as robust as wild species. Some hybrids have been developed to produce high levels of essential oil for use as flavoring or medicine.

=== Cultivars ===
The following cultivars have gained the Royal Horticultural Society's Award of Garden Merit:

- 'Beauty of Cobham' (pink)
- 'Gardenview Scarlet'
- 'Marshall's Delight' (pink)
- 'Squaw' (red)
- 'Talud' (pink)

The UK National Collection of Monardas is held at Glyn Bach Gardens at Pont Hywel, Efailwen, near Llandissilio in Pembrokeshire.

Carole Whittaker of Glyn Bach Gardens was appointed International Cultivar Registration Authority for Mondarda in 2019, and currently recognises over 100 cultivars.

== Ecology ==
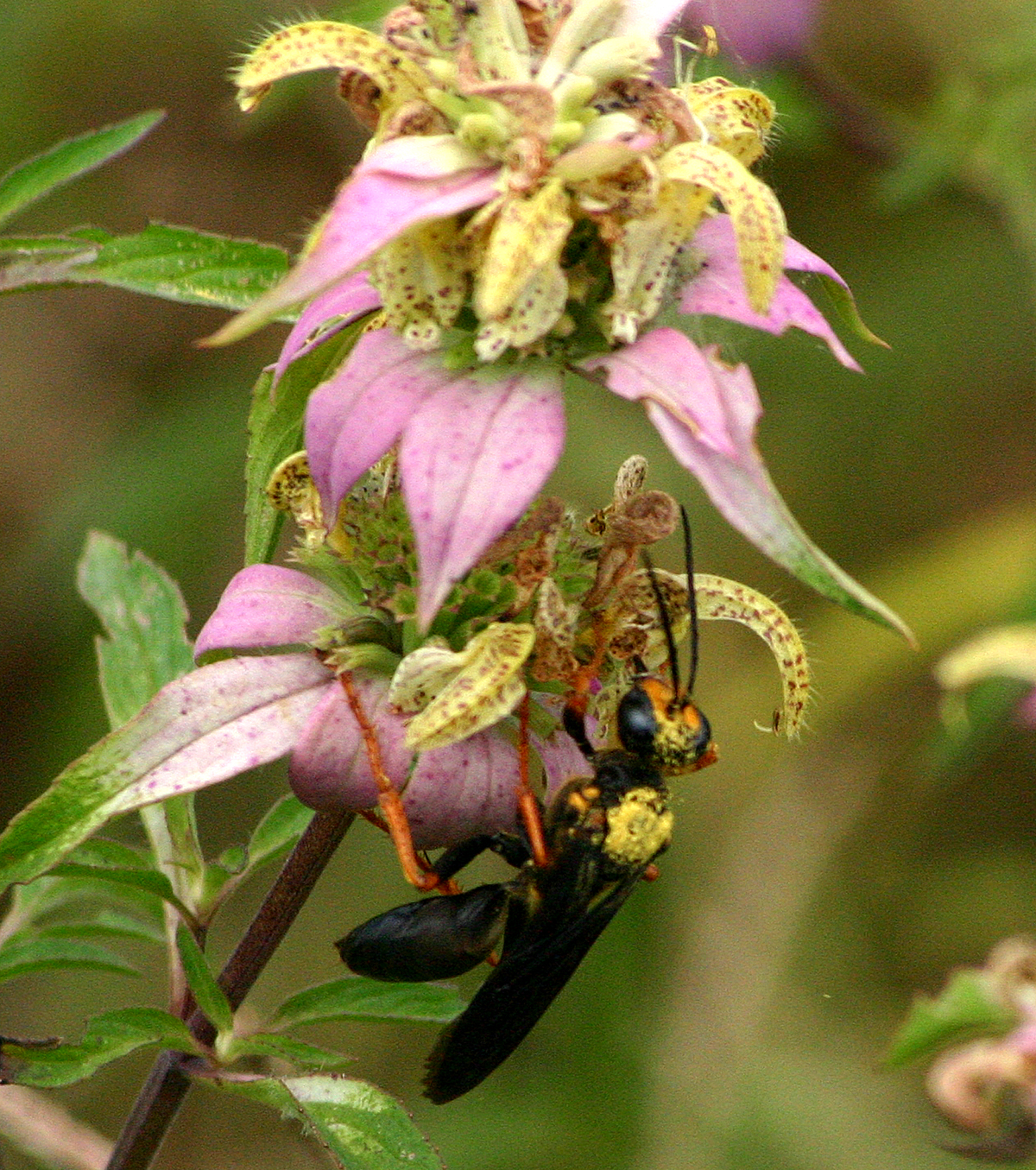
Wasp (Sphex flavovestitus) pollinating M. punctata

Monarda species are used as food plants by the larvae of some Lepidoptera species, including case-bearers of the genus Coleophora. Coleophora monardae feeds only on Monarda plants, and C. heinrichella and C. monardella only feed on the species M. fistulosa.

== Taxonomy ==
Monarda is in the tribe Mentheae of the subfamily Nepetoideae in the mint family. Molecular phylogenetic studies of this tribe have been poorly sampled, and relationships within it remain unclear. The genera Blephilia and Pycnanthemum are close relatives of Monarda, but they might not be the closest. Monarda is divided into two distinct subgenera, Monarda and Cheilyctis. These are easily distinguished by several characteristics.

=== Species ===
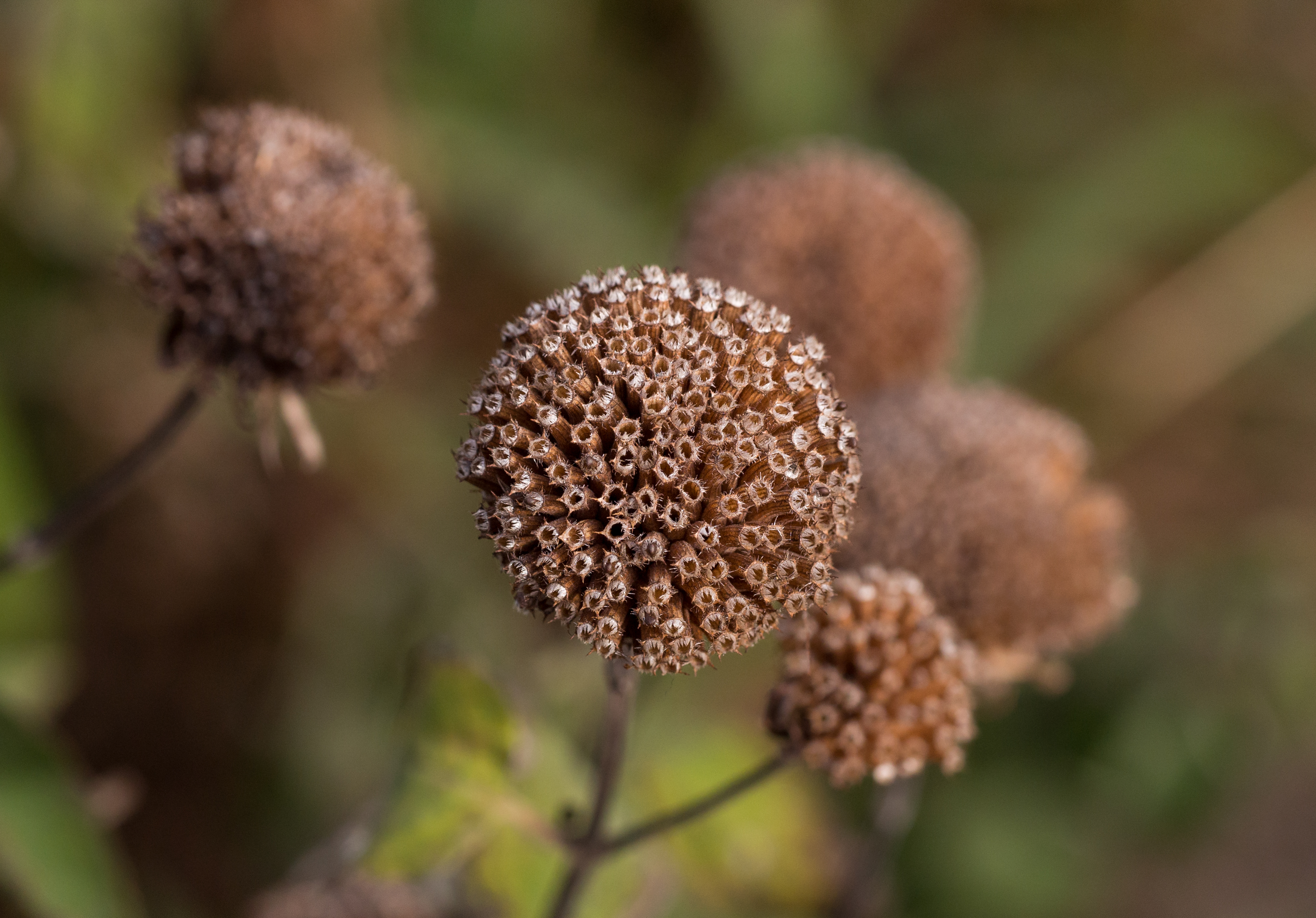
M. didyma seedhead

Species in the genus include:

- Monarda bartlettii Standl. - Tamaulipas, Veracuz
- Monarda balmettii Nutt. - fools balm - northwest United States
- Monarda bradburiana L.C.Beck – eastern beebalm - mid Mississippi Valley
- Monarda citriodora Cerv. ex Lag. – lemon beebalm, lemon-mint - southern United States, northern Mexico
- Monarda clinopodia L. – white bergamot, basil beebalm - eastern United States, especially Appalachians
- Monarda clinopodioides A.Gray – basil beebalm - Kansas, Oklahoma, Texas, Louisiana
- Monarda didyma L. – Oswego tea, scarlet beebalm, fragrantbalm, mountain-mint - eastern United States, especially Appalachians, eastern Canada
- Monarda eplingiana Standl. - Coahuila
- Monarda fistulosa L. – wild bergamot, mintleaf beebalm, horse-mint, purple beebalm - widespread across most of United States + Canada; Tamaulipas, Nuevo León; cultivated in China and elsewhere
- Monarda fruticulosa Epling – spotted beebalm - southern Texas
- Monarda humilis (Torr.) Prather & J.A.Keith - New Mexico
- Monarda lindheimeri Engelm. & A.Gray ex A.Gray – Lindheimer's beebalm - Texas, Louisiana, southwestern Arkansas
- Monarda luteola Singhurst & W.C.Holmes - northeastern Texas, southwestern Arkansas
- Monarda maritima (Cory) Correll – seaside beebalm - coastal plain of Texas
- Monarda media Willd. – purple bergamot - Ontario, eastern United States
- Monarda × medioides W.H.Duncan - Georgia, Indiana (M. fistulosa × M. media)
- Monarda pectinata Nutt. – plains beebalm, pony beebalm, spotted beebalm - central + southwestern United States (Great Plains, Rocky Mountains, southwestern desert mountains)
- Monarda pringlei Fernald - Nuevo León
- Monarda punctata L. – spotted beebalm, dotted monarda, horse-mint - Quebec, Ontario, eastern + south-central United States, California, northeastern Mexico
- Monarda russeliana Nutt. ex Sims – redpurple beebalm - Texas, Oklahoma, Arkansas, Alabama, Mississippi, Kentucky
- Monarda stanfieldii Small – Stanfield's beebalm - central Texas
- Monarda viridissima Correll – green beebalm - east-central Texas

=== Formerly placed here ===
- Blephilia ciliata (L.) Benth. (as M. ciliata L.)
- Blephilia hirsuta (Pursh) Benth. (as M. ciliata Pursh)
