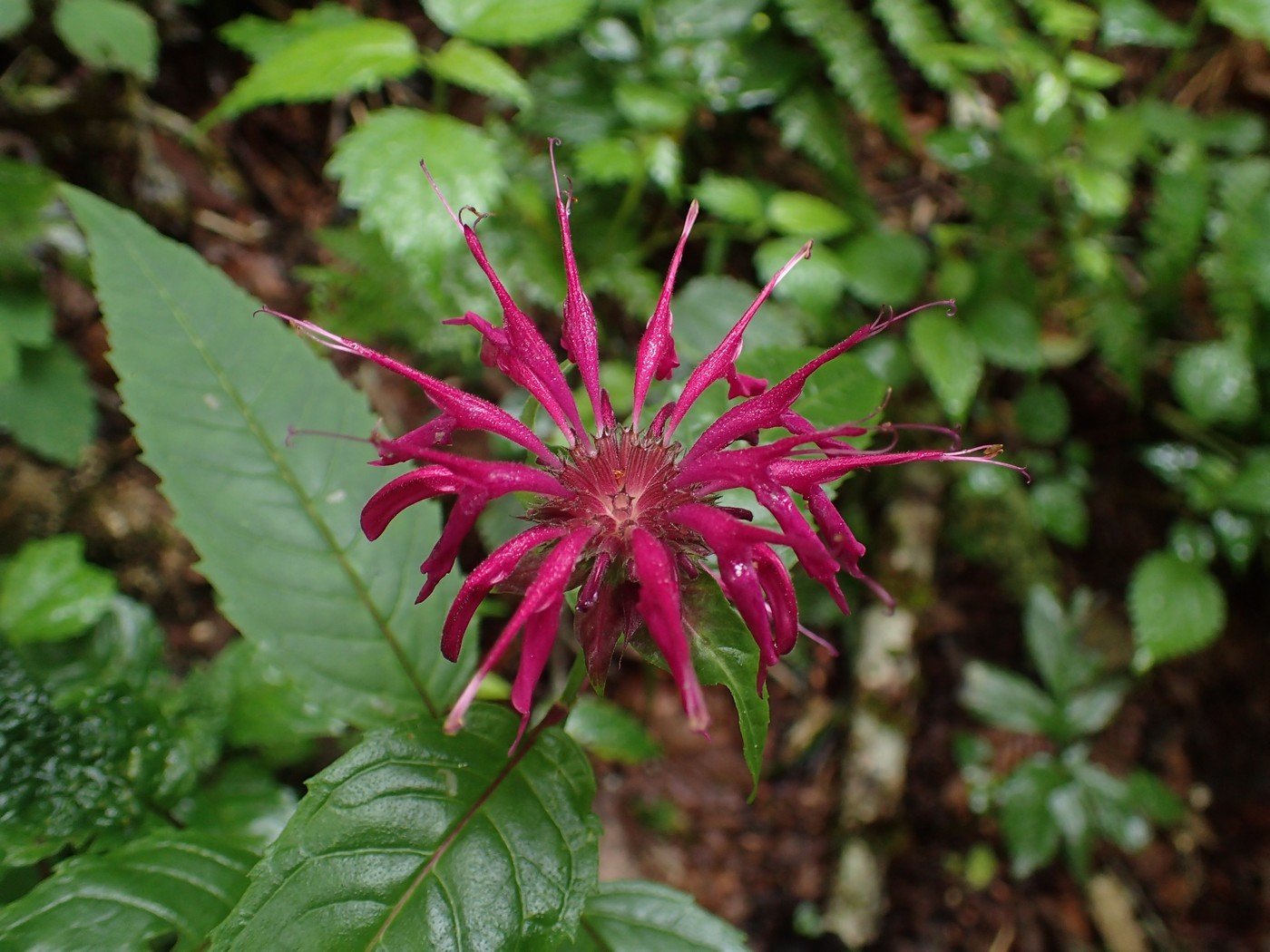

Conservation status
- Apparently Secure (NatureServe)

Scientific classification
- Kingdom: Plantae
- Clade: Tracheophytes
- Clade: Angiosperms
- Clade: Eudicots
- Clade: Asterids
- Order: Lamiales
- Family: Lamiaceae
- Genus: Monarda
- Species: M. media

Binomial name
- Monarda media Willd.

= Monarda media =

Purple bergamot

Species of flowering plant

Monarda media is a species of flowering plant in the mint family known by the common name purple bergamot. It is native to eastern North America, including the eastern United States and Ontario in Canada.

This species is a rhizomatous perennial herb with square stems growing 2 to 3 feet tall. It may spread to form a colony. The oppositely arranged leaves are lance-shaped and mint-scented. The inflorescence contains tubular reddish purple flowers with purplish bracts beneath. The flowers are attractive to insects. The seed heads are attractive to birds.

This plant grows in swampy habitat such as stream beds.
