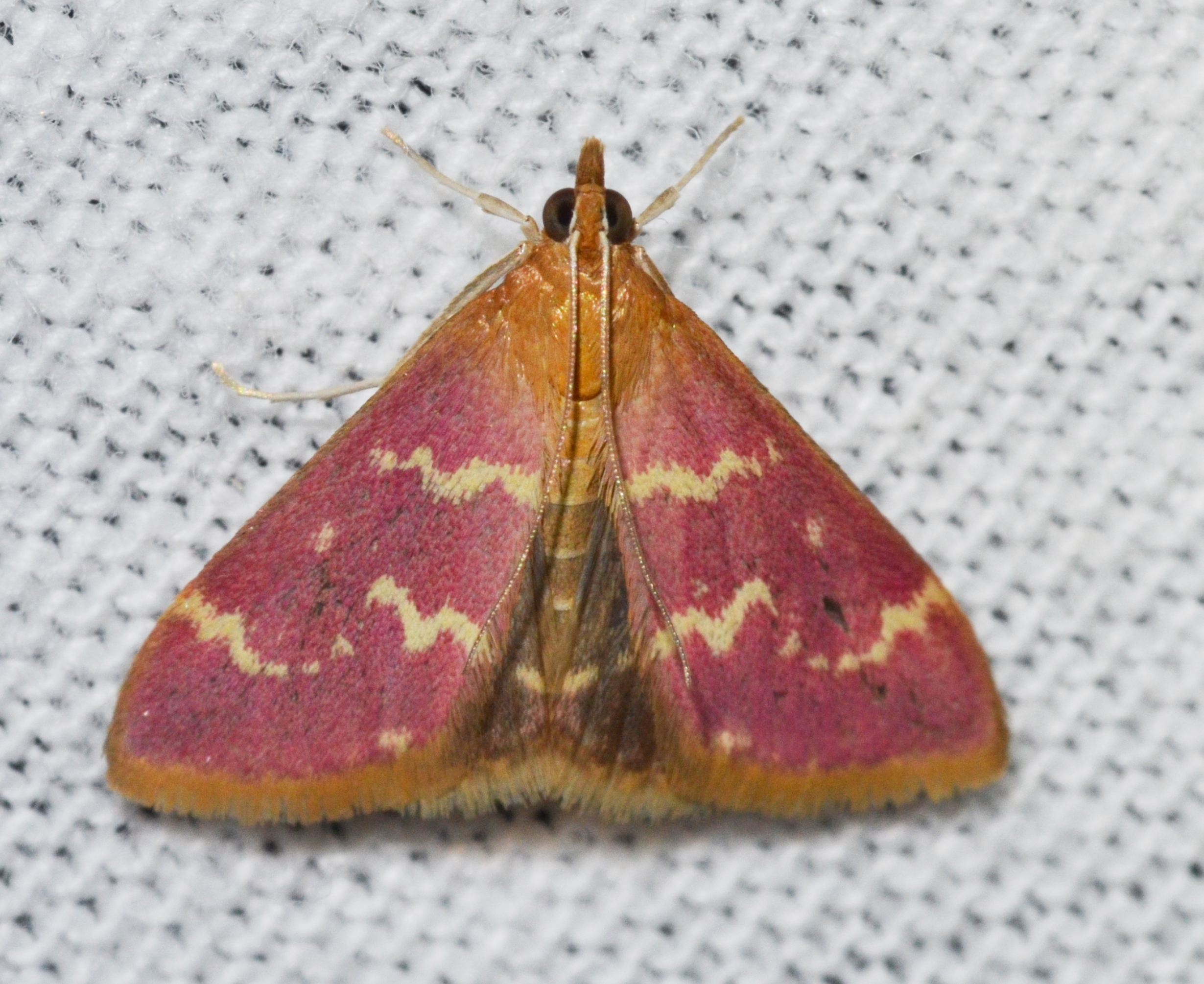

Conservation status
- Secure (NatureServe)

Scientific classification
- Kingdom: Animalia
- Phylum: Arthropoda
- Clade: Pancrustacea
- Class: Insecta
- Order: Lepidoptera
- Family: Crambidae
- Genus: Pyrausta
- Species: P. signatalis

Binomial name
- Pyrausta signatalis (Walker, 1866)

Synonyms
- Rhodaria signatalis Walker, 1866; Botys (Rhodaria) vinulenta Grote & Robinson, 1867; Botys medullalis Snellen, 1899

= Pyrausta signatalis =

Species of moth

Pyrausta signatalis, the raspberry pyrausta moth, is a moth in the family Crambidae. It was described by Francis Walker in 1866.

== Range ==
It is found in North America, where it has been recorded from British Columbia to Ontario, south to North Carolina, South Carolina, Texas and Arizona. The habitat consists of aspen parkland and grasslands.

== Behavior ==
The larvae feed on Monarda species, including Monarda fistulosa, consuming mainly reproductive parts (flowers and seeds).

== Life history ==
In rearing records from Melrose, Massachusetts, larvae fed on the flowers of beebalm (Monarda), with larvae collected in July and August and pupae found in August and again the following spring; the species overwinters as a prepupa within a cocoon. Adults were recorded in August, and again from June to early July, indicating at least a partial second generation per year in this area.

== Parasites ==
Several parasitoid insects have been reared from P. signatalis larvae. Tachinid flies recorded include Nemorilla floralis and Phorocera erecta, as well as an unidentified species of Lespesia (cited by Schaffner under the now-synonymized genus name Achaetoneura (Note: Achaetoneura Brauer & Bergenstamm, 1891, was synonymized with Lespesia Robineau-Desvoidy, 1863, by Beneway (1963).)); this fly emerged one per host in August, over at least two generations a year, with its hibernation stage undetermined.

The braconid wasp Bracon gelechiae has also been reared from P. signatalis larvae, with adults emerging (up to six per host) in June and August.
