= Monarda viridissima =

Conservation status
- Vulnerable (NatureServe)

Scientific classification
- Kingdom: Plantae
- Clade: Tracheophytes
- Clade: Angiosperms
- Clade: Eudicots
- Clade: Asterids
- Order: Lamiales
- Family: Lamiaceae
- Genus: Monarda
- Species: M. viridissima

Binomial name
- Monarda viridissima Correll

Species of plant

Monarda viridissima is a species of flowering plant in the mint family. It is commonly known as green beebalm and Texas beebalm.

== Description ==
Monarda viridissima is a perennial herb that is endemic to Texas. It can grow up to 32 in (81 cm) tall. Flowers are white, red, pink or purple in color and bloom between June and October. Its habitats include openings and clearings in post oak woodlands. It is a vulnerable species that is threatened by habitat loss and fire suppression. There are 20–100 occurrences in its range.
