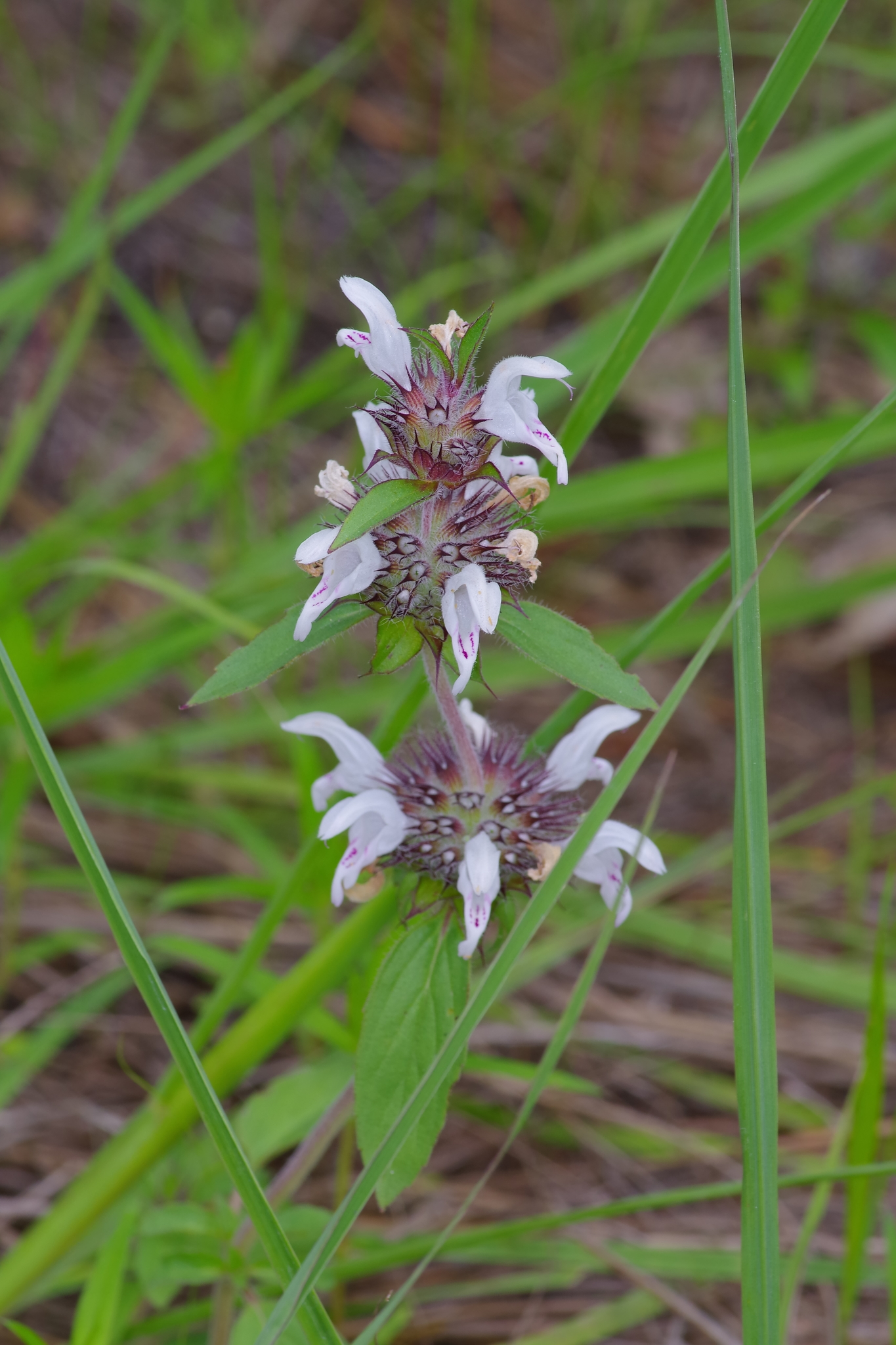

Scientific classification
- Kingdom: Plantae
- Clade: Tracheophytes
- Clade: Angiosperms
- Clade: Eudicots
- Clade: Asterids
- Order: Lamiales
- Family: Lamiaceae
- Genus: Monarda
- Species: M. clinopodioides

Binomial name
- Monarda clinopodioides A.Gray

Synonyms
- Monarda aristata Hook.

= Monarda clinopodioides =

Species of flowering plant

Monarda clinopodioides, common name basil beebalm, is a plant species native to Kansas, Oklahoma, Louisiana and Texas.

Monarda clinopodioides is an annual herb that can exceed 30 cm (12 inches) in height. Leaves are lanceolate to oblong, tapering at both ends, with small hairs and small teeth. Flowers are born in small glomerules (clumps) of pink or purple flowers and green bracts, born in the axils of the upper leaves.
