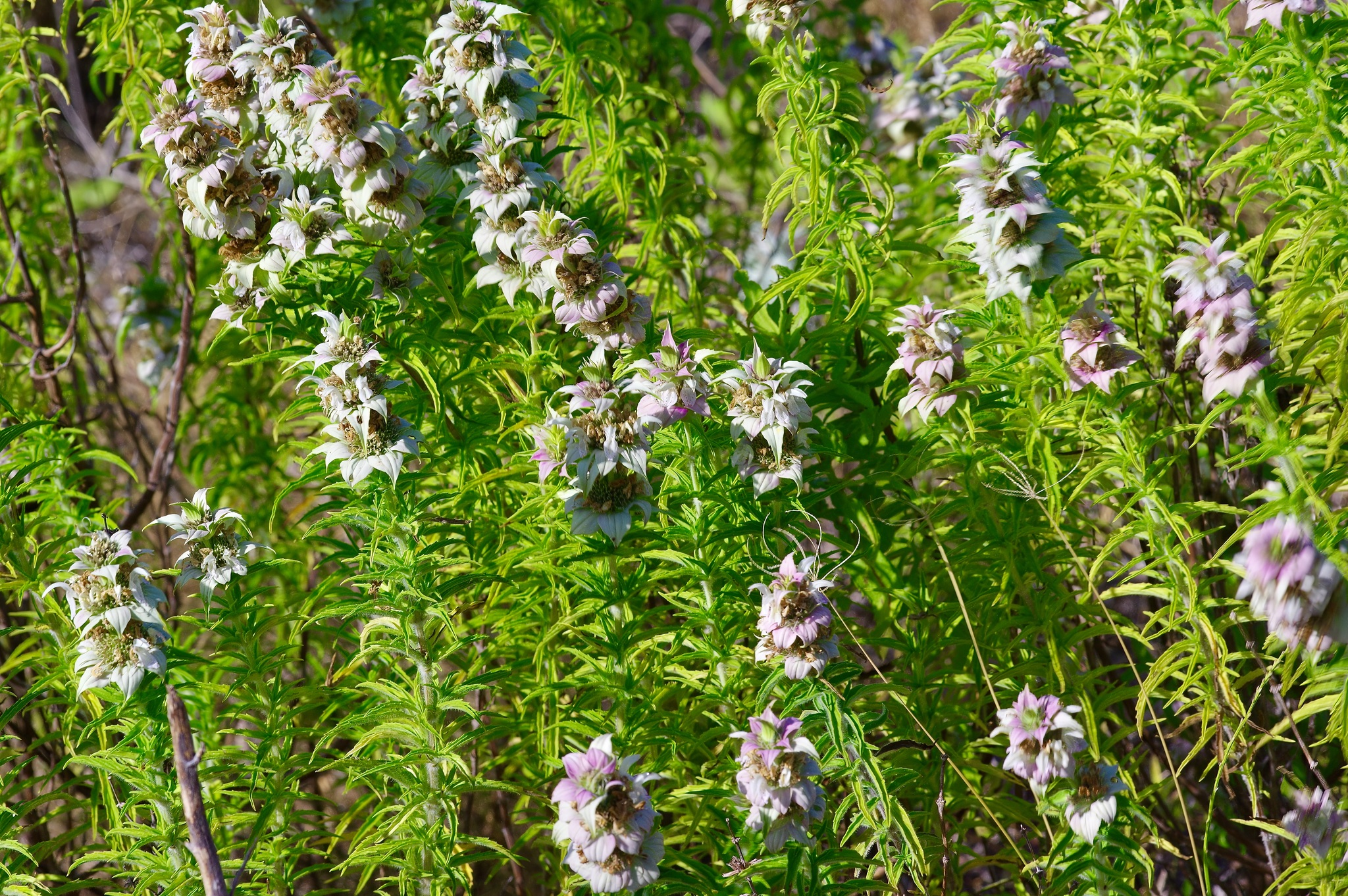

Scientific classification
- Kingdom: Plantae
- Clade: Tracheophytes
- Clade: Angiosperms
- Clade: Eudicots
- Clade: Asterids
- Order: Lamiales
- Family: Lamiaceae
- Genus: Monarda
- Species: M. maritima

Binomial name
- Monarda maritima (Cory) Correll

Synonyms
- Monarda punctata var. maritima Cory

= Monarda maritima =

Species of plant

Monarda maritima, the seaside beebalm, is a species of flowering plant in the family Lamiaceae. It is endemic to deep sandy soils of the Coastal Bend of Texas. A perennial herb, it can reach 3 ft (0.9 m), sometimes taller.
