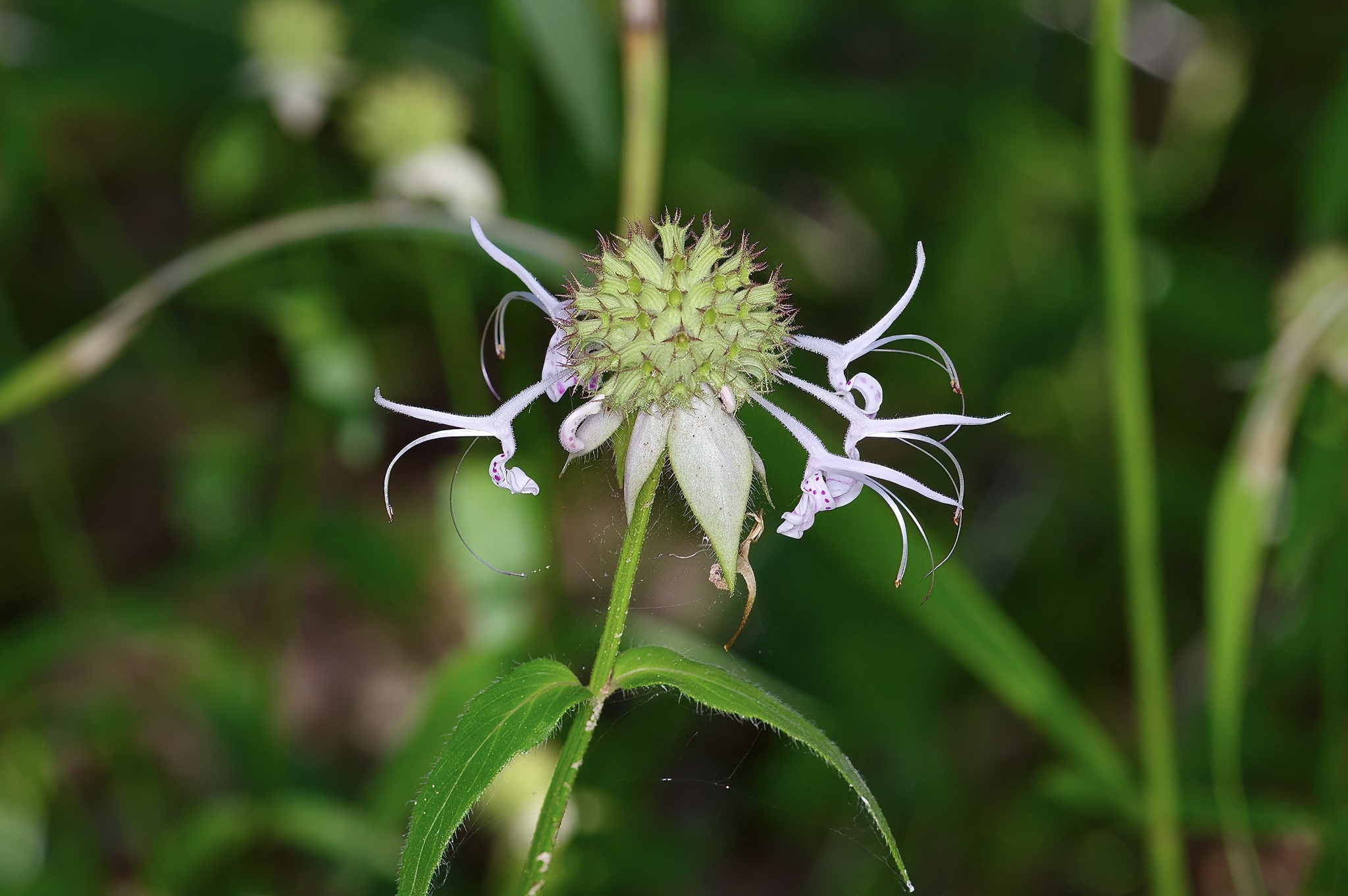

Scientific classification
- Kingdom: Plantae
- Clade: Tracheophytes
- Clade: Angiosperms
- Clade: Eudicots
- Clade: Asterids
- Order: Lamiales
- Family: Lamiaceae
- Genus: Monarda
- Species: M. russeliana

Binomial name
- Monarda russeliana Nutt. ex Sims

= Monarda russeliana =

Species of plant

Monarda russeliana is a species of flowering plant in the mint family. It is commonly known as redpurple beebalm and Russell's beebalm.

== Range ==
It is native to Alabama, Arkansas, Kentucky, Oklahoma, and Texas.

== Description ==
M. russeliana is a perennial herb and grows up to 30 in (76 cm) tall. Flowers bloom April to June. Flower petals are pale lavender to white in color with purple dots. Leaves are fragrant, simple and opposite in arrangement. It grows in rocky or sandy soil and in open, partially shaded woodlands.
