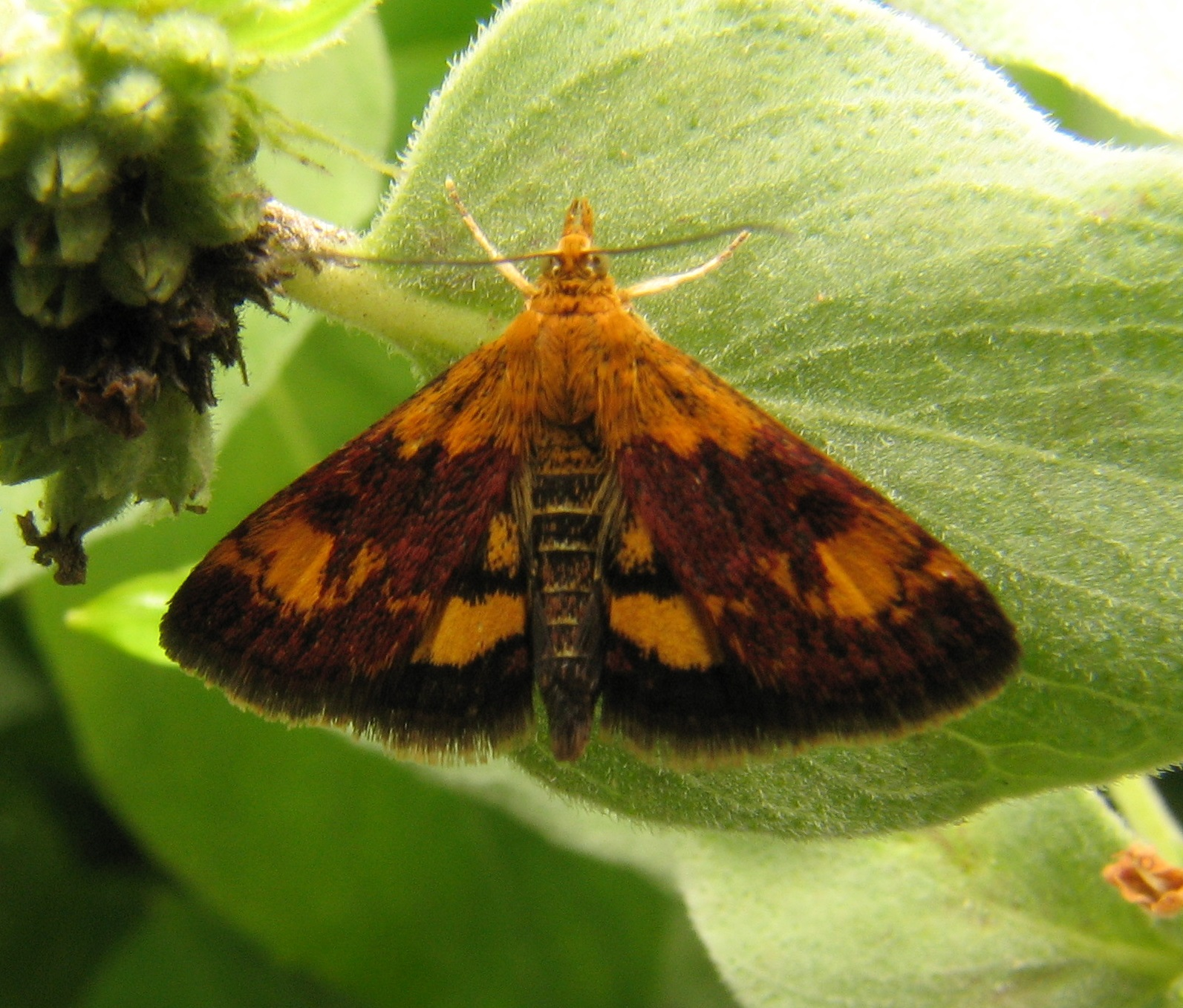

Scientific classification
- Kingdom: Animalia
- Phylum: Arthropoda
- Class: Insecta
- Order: Lepidoptera
- Family: Crambidae
- Genus: Pyrausta
- Species: P. orphisalis

Binomial name
- Pyrausta orphisalis Walker, 1859

Synonyms
- Pyrausta ochosalis Dyar, 1903

= Pyrausta orphisalis =

Species of moth

Pyrausta orphisalis, the orange mint moth or orange-spotted pyrausta, is a species of moth of the family Crambidae. It was described by Francis Walker in 1859. It is found in North America from Newfoundland west to British Columbia, south to Florida and New Mexico.

The wingspan is about 15-17 mm. The moth flies from mid June to late July depending on the location.

The larvae feed on various mint species, including Monarda.
