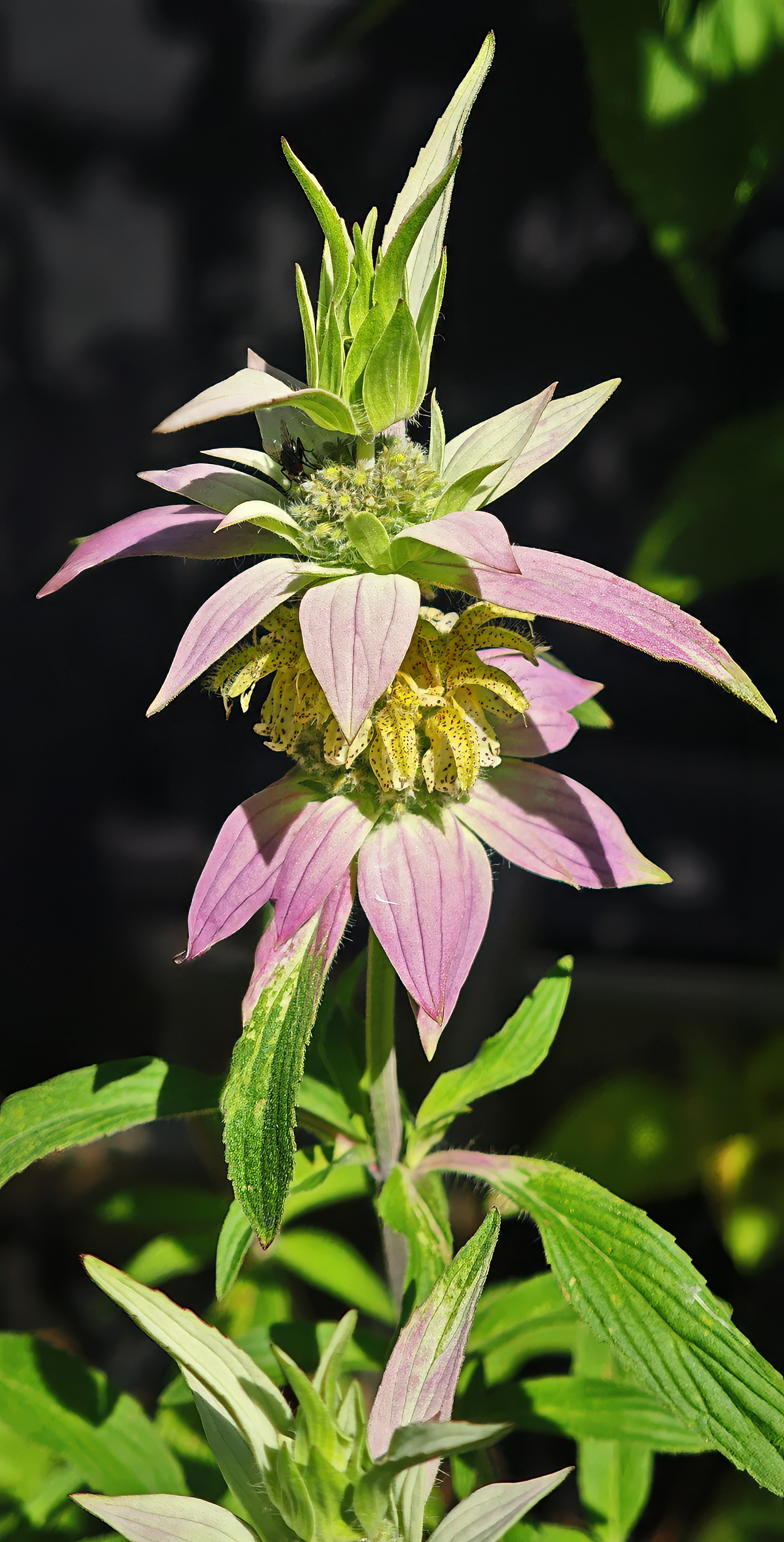

Scientific classification
- Kingdom: Plantae
- Clade: Embryophytes
- Clade: Tracheophytes
- Clade: Spermatophytes
- Clade: Angiosperms
- Clade: Eudicots
- Clade: Asterids
- Order: Lamiales
- Family: Lamiaceae
- Genus: Monarda
- Species: M. punctata

Binomial name
- Monarda punctata L.

= Monarda punctata =

Species of flowering plant

Monarda punctata is a herbaceous plant in the mint family, Lamiaceae, that is native to eastern Canada, the eastern United States and northeastern Mexico. Common names include spotted beebalm and horsemint.

== Varieties ==
- Monarda punctata var. arkansana (E.M.McClint. & Epling) Shinners
- Monarda punctata var. correllii B.L.Turner
- Monarda punctata var. coryi (E.M.McClint. & Epling) Shinners
- Monarda punctata var. immaculata (Pennell) Scora
- Monarda punctata var. intermedia (E.M.McClint. & Epling) Waterf
- Monarda punctata var. lasiodonta A.Gray
- Monarda punctata var. occidentalis (Epling) E.J.Palmer & Steyerm
- Monarda punctata var. punctata
- Monarda punctata var. villicaulis (Pennell) E.J.Palmer & Steyerm

== Description ==
It is a thyme-scented plant with heads of purple-spotted tubular yellow flowers above rosettes of large white- or pink-tipped bracts. The plant contains thymol, an antiseptic and fungicide.

Unlike most Monarda species that have a single flower head on a stem, Monarda punctata has flowers that are stacked up the stem with bracts radiating from the stem, under each flower. Varying in color from light pink to white, the bracts are ornamental and longer than the flowers, whereas the flowers (yellow with brown spots) are visible only at close range.

== Native Range ==
Native distribution includes Ontario and Quebec and much of the Eastern United States including: Vermont to Minnesota, south to Texas, New Mexico and north to Kansas, through the east coast (excluding West Virginia) with isolated populations in California. The species is considered locally endangered (see Endangered species) in the state of Ohio.

== Ecological value ==
Monarda punctata attracts pollinators in great numbers, especially wasps. Among the wasps that it brings to the garden are beneficial predatory wasps that control grubs, pest caterpillars, and other harmful insects. It is the sole source of pollen for the specialist bee species Protandrena abdominalis.

== Uses ==
It was historically used to treat upset stomachs, colds, diarrhea, neuralgia and kidney disease.

== Gallery ==
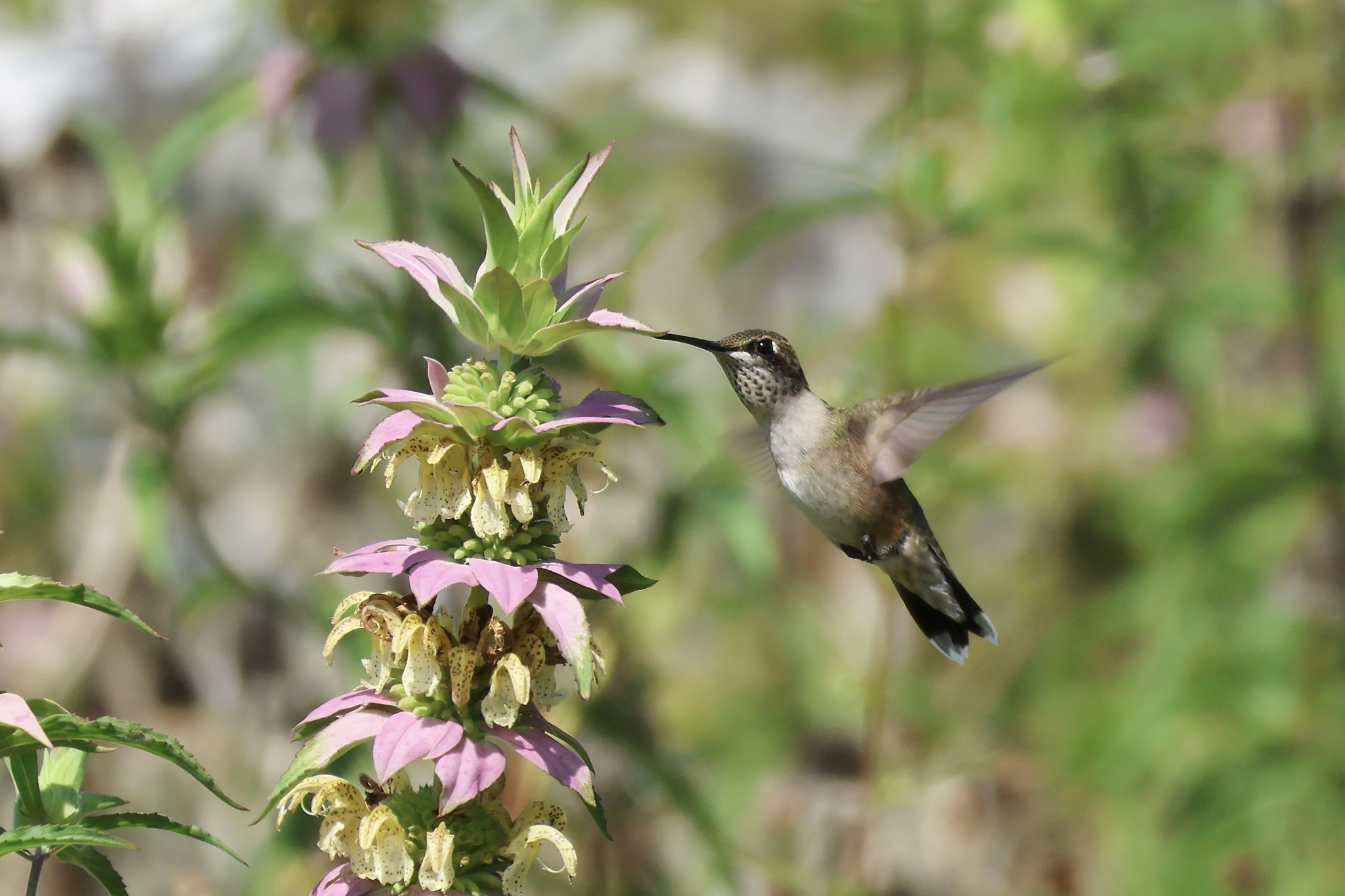
Ruby-throated hummingbird feeding from M. punctata

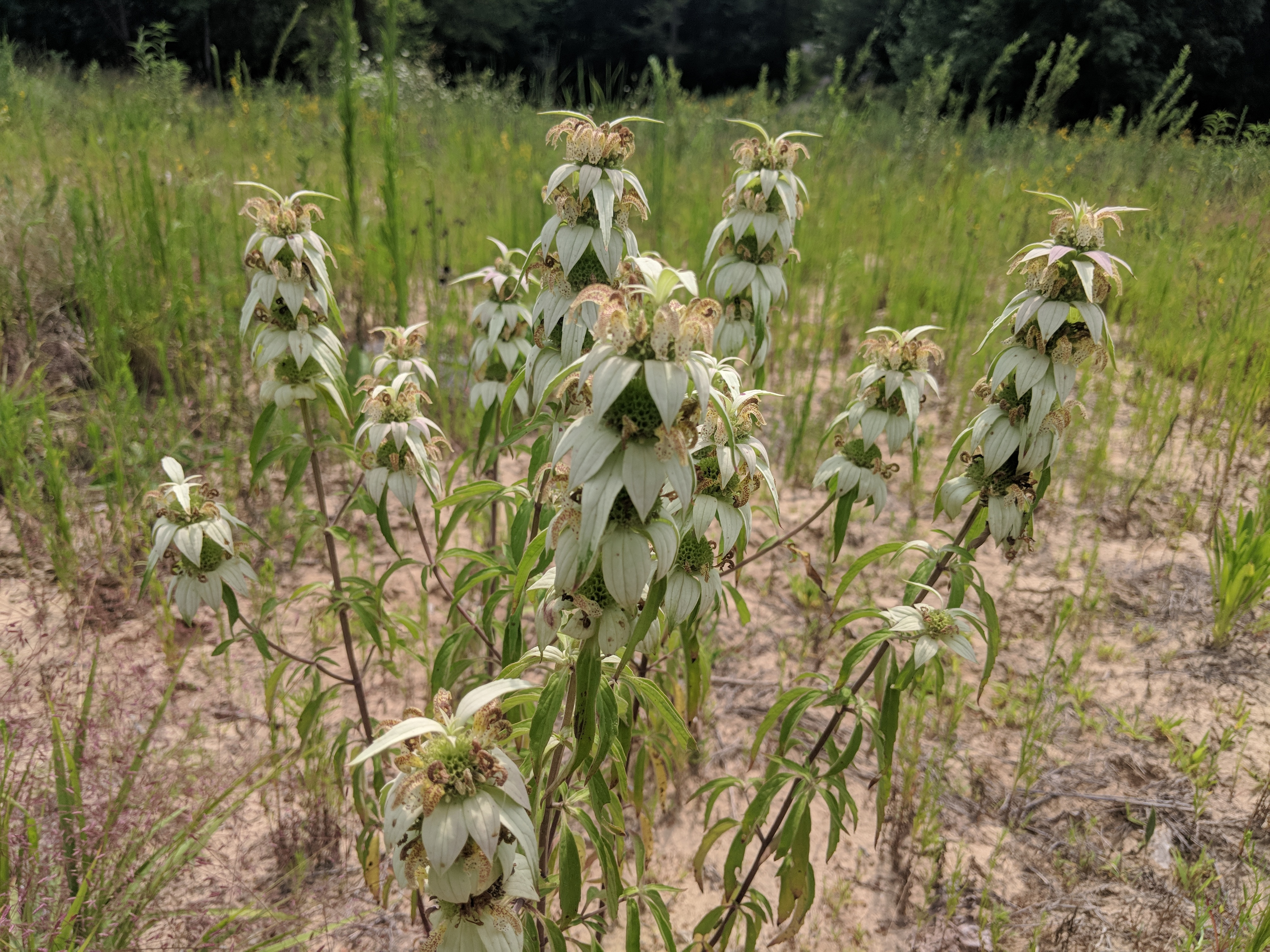
M. punctata from Kent Park, Iowa. Found in a sandy section of soil on a hill.

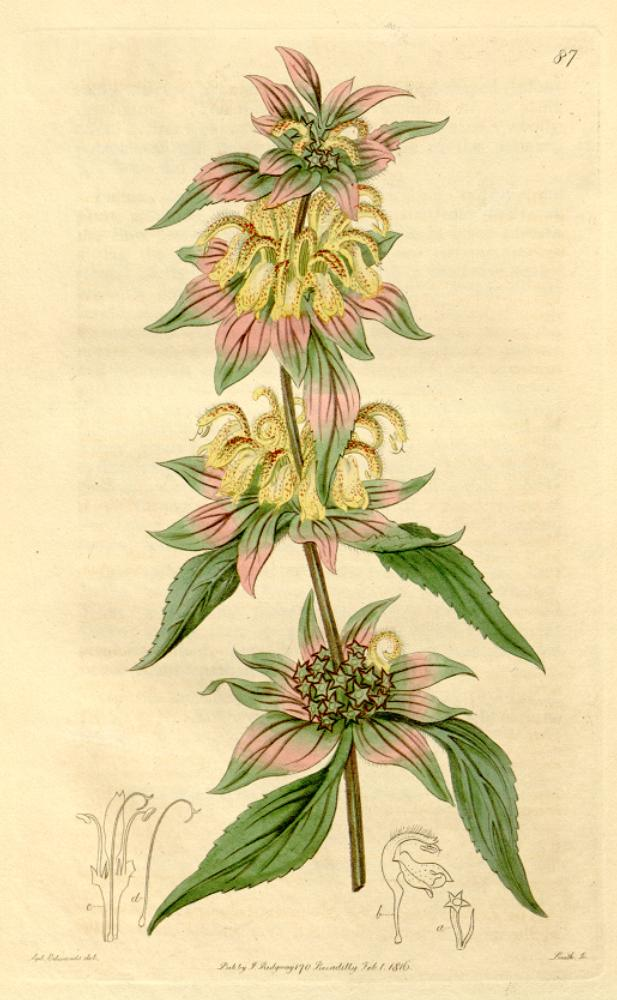
1815 illustration by Sydenham Edwards
