= Coleophora heinrichella =

Scientific classification
- Kingdom: Animalia
- Phylum: Arthropoda
- Class: Insecta
- Order: Lepidoptera
- Family: Coleophoridae
- Genus: Coleophora
- Species: C. heinrichella

Binomial name
- Coleophora heinrichella (McDunnough, 1933)

Synonyms
- Haploptilia heinrichella McDunnough, 1933

Species of moth

Coleophora heinrichella is a moth of the family Coleophoridae. It is found in Canada, including Ontario.

The larvae feed on the leaves of Rudbeckia, Helianthus and Aster species. They create a trivalved, tubular silken case.

== See also ==
- List of moths of Canada
