= Coleophora monardae =

Scientific classification
- Kingdom: Animalia
- Phylum: Arthropoda
- Class: Insecta
- Order: Lepidoptera
- Family: Coleophoridae
- Genus: Coleophora
- Species: C. monardae

Binomial name
- Coleophora monardae McDunnough, 1945

Species of moth

Coleophora monardae is a moth of the family Coleophoridae. It is commonly called a casebearer moth. It is found in Canada, including Ontario.

== See also ==
- List of moths of Canada
