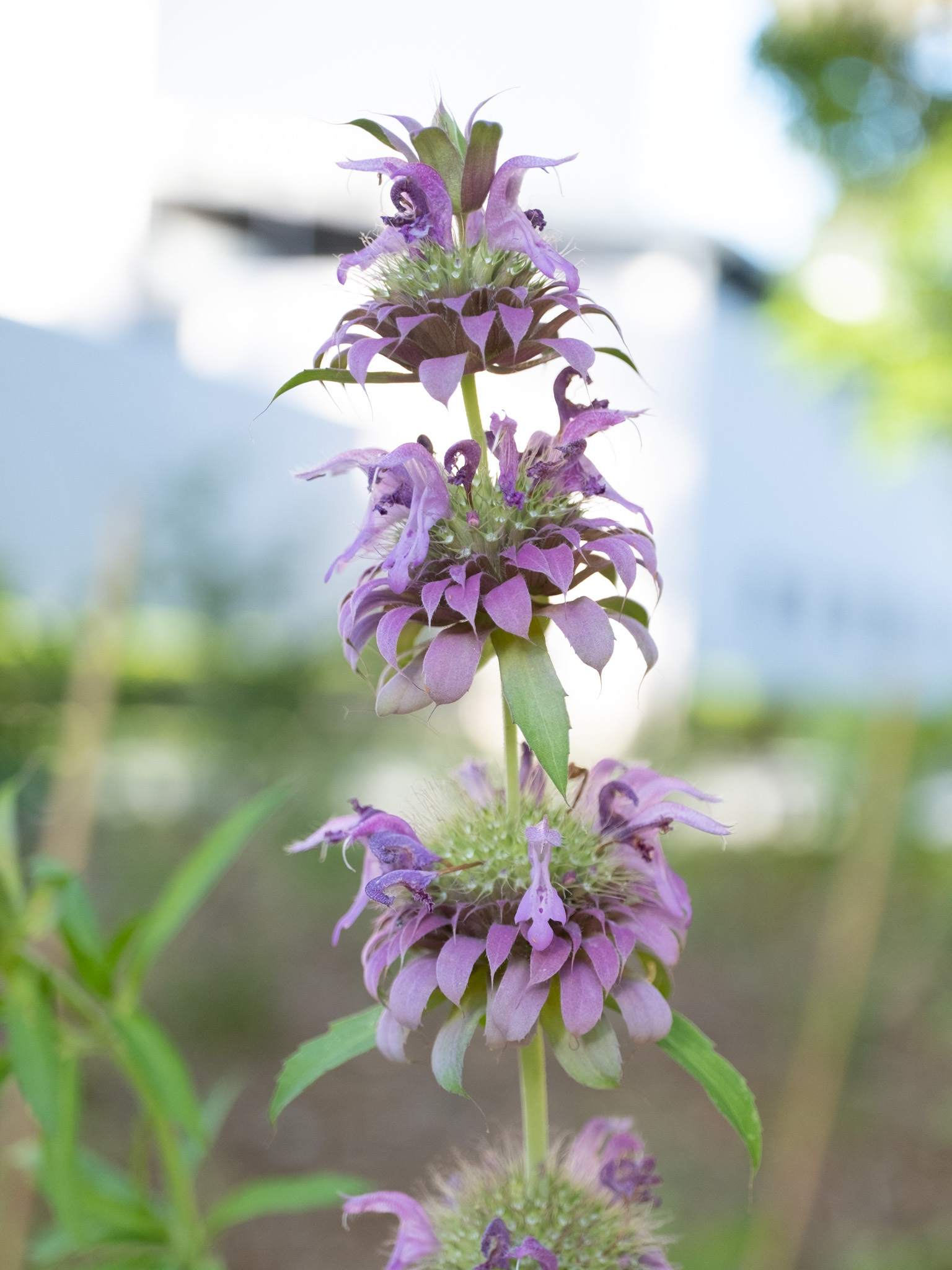

Scientific classification
- Kingdom: Plantae
- Clade: Tracheophytes
- Clade: Angiosperms
- Clade: Eudicots
- Clade: Asterids
- Order: Lamiales
- Family: Lamiaceae
- Genus: Monarda
- Species: M. citriodora

Binomial name
- Monarda citriodora Cerv. ex Lag.

= Monarda citriodora =

Species of flowering plant

Monarda citriodora is a species of flowering plant in the mint family, Lamiaceae, that is native to the southern United States and northern Mexico. Common names include lemon beebalm, lemon mint (this may also apply to Eau de Cologne mint) and purple horsemint. When crushed, the leaves emit an odor reminiscent of lemons. This odor is sometimes described as more resembling oregano, especially late in the season. Its purple flowers are highly attractive to butterflies, bees and hummingbirds.

== Description ==
Lemon beebalm can tolerate dry soil, and requires little water and direct sun light. Several stems grow from the base and are lined with pairs of lance-shaped leaves. It grows quickly during spring, reaching up to 90 centimetres (3 ft) high, and blooms its white, purple and pink colored flowers from May through July (in the northern hemisphere), continuing to bloom even later in the year if given water. The plant dies with the first frost, and although lemon beebalm is an annual, its seeds can germinate and grow the following year. The Latin specific epithet citriodora means having a citrus aroma.

== Habitat and range ==
This widespread plant grows in prairies, roadsides and other sunny habitats from Arizona to Florida, and from Nebraska to Michoacán. It prefers soils with a high percentage of clay, such as the vertisols and mollisols typical of tallgrass prairies, where it sometimes forms impressive blankets of summer flowers.

Varieties

1. Monarda citriodora var. austromontana (Epling) B.L.Turner - Arizona, New Mexico, Chihuahua, Sonora, and elsewhere in Mexico
2. Monarda citriodora var. citriodora - Kansas, Missouri, Oklahoma, Arkansas, Utah, Texas, Tamaulipas
3. Monarda citriodora var. parva Scora - southern Texas

== Uses ==
=== Culinary ===
Some people use lemon beebalm as an addition to salads and teas. It's also used sometimes in wines and liqueurs. It can give a good flavor to certain seafood and meat dishes too, such as crab and chicken. Lemon beebalm is an ingredient in many dessert recipes, and is used for flavoring in cakes, cheesecakes, sauces, and pies.

But most recipes bearing the name "lemon mint" actually used spearmint and the juice or other components of the actual fruit of the lemon plant rather than this plant. However, lemon beebalm is occasionally used in herbal teas.

=== Medicinal ===
Teas made from the leaves is used by herbalists to supposedly treat colds, coughs, fevers, and respiratory problems.

=== Insect repellent ===
The essential oil of lemon beebalm contains citronellol, which makes it useful as an insect repellent. It has been used to deter fleas and mites.
