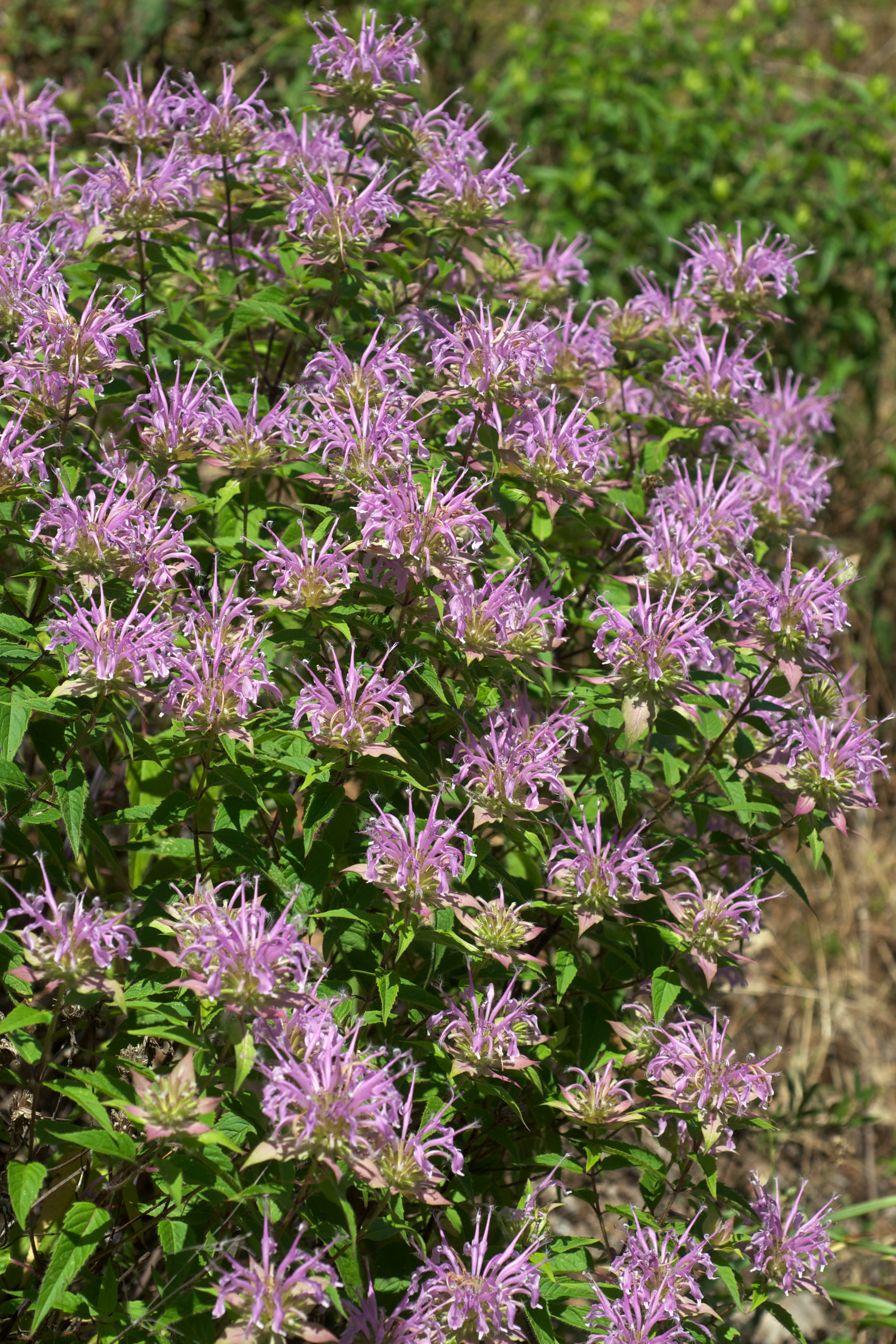

Conservation status
- Secure (NatureServe)

Scientific classification
- Kingdom: Plantae
- Clade: Tracheophytes
- Clade: Angiosperms
- Clade: Eudicots
- Clade: Asterids
- Order: Lamiales
- Family: Lamiaceae
- Genus: Monarda
- Species: M. fistulosa

Binomial name
- Monarda fistulosa L.

Varieties
- M. fistulosa var. fistulosa; M. fistulosa var. longepetiolata B.Boivin; M. fistulosa var. maheuxii B.Boivin; M. fistulosa var. menthifolia (Graham) Fernald; M. fistulosa var. mollis (L.) L.; M. fistulosa var. rubra A.Gray; M. fistulosa var. stipitatoglandulosa (Waterf.) ined.

= Monarda fistulosa =

Wild bergamot

Plant species in the mint family

Monarda fistulosa, the wild bergamot or bee balm, is a wildflower in the mint family Lamiaceae, widespread and abundant as a native plant in much of North America. This plant, with showy summer-blooming pink to lavender flowers, is often used as a honey plant, medicinal plant, and garden ornamental. The species is quite variable, and several subspecies or varieties have been recognized within it. Despite its name, it has no relation to the 'true' bergamot, a citrus fruit.

== Description and distribution ==
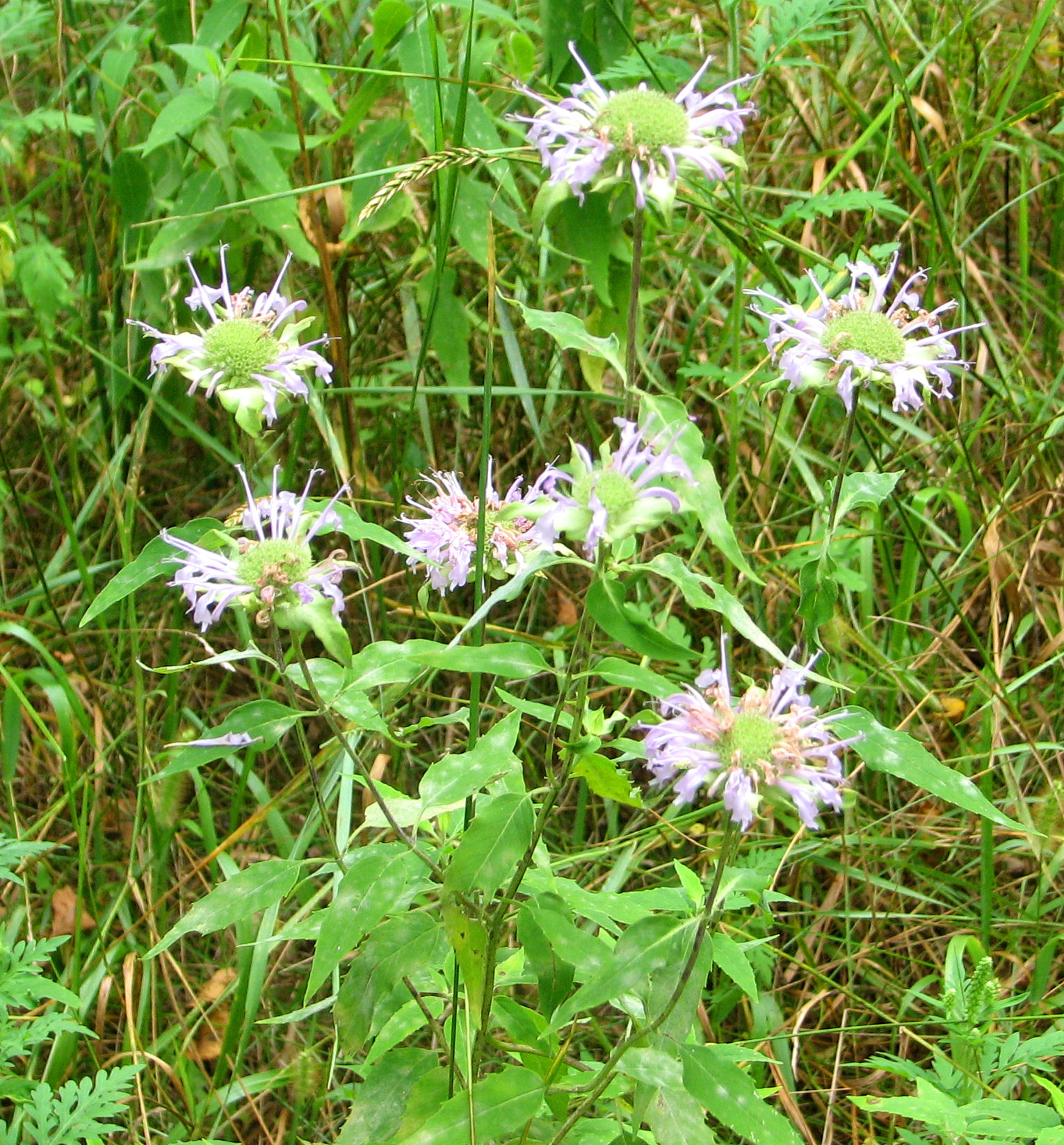

Monarda fistulosa is an herbaceous perennial that grows from slender creeping rhizomes, thus commonly occurring in large clumps. The plants are typically up to 3 ft (0.91 m) tall, with a few erect branches. Its leaves are 2–3 in (5.1–7.6 cm) long, lance-shaped, and toothed. Its compact flower clusters are solitary at the ends of branches. Each cluster is about 1.5 in (3.8 cm) long, containing about 20–50 flowers. Wild bergamot often grows in rich soils in dry fields, thickets, and clearings, usually on limy soil. The plants generally flower from June to September.

Monarda fistulosa ranges from Quebec to the Northwest Territories and British Columbia, south to Georgia, Texas, Arizona, Idaho, and northeastern Washington. The Latin specific epithet fistulosa means hollow like a pipe.

The plant is noted for its fragrance, though the composition of its oils is quite variable. It can have thymol, geraniol, carvacrol, p-cymene, γ-terpinene, α-terpinene, and α-thujene in different amounts with the exact cause of this variability still being researched, though environmental and genetic factors probably both play a role. At least one population in Colorado also contains linalool.

== Taxonomy ==
Several varieties have been variously recognized within Monarda fistulosa, of which some have also been treated as subspecies or as distinct species. Some of the varieties are geographically widespread, and others are quite restricted in their ranges. Varieties include:

- Monarda fistulosa var. brevis – Smoke Hole bergamot (Virginia and West Virginia)
- Monarda fistulosa var. fistulosa – wild bergamot (widespread, primarily eastern and central North America)
- Monarda fistulosa var. longipetiolata – (Ontario and Quebec)
- Monarda fistulosa var. maheuxii – (Ontario)
- Monarda fistulosa var. menthifolia – (widespread, western North America, excluding Oregon and California)
- Monarda fistulosa var. mollis – (widespread, primarily eastern and central North America)
- Monarda fistulosa var. rubra – (eastern North America, uncommon)
- Monarda fistulosa, unnamed variety – (Arkansas and Oklahoma)

One authority states that Native Americans recognized four kinds of wild bergamot that had different odors (Wood, 1997).

== Conservation status in the United States ==
It is listed as historical in Rhode Island.

== Uses ==
Wild bergamot is considered a medicinal plant by many Native Americans. The Oneida call it "Number Six", in honor of it being "the sixth medicine given by the Creator"; other nations that use it include the Menominee, the Ojibwe, and the Winnebago (Ho-Chunk). It is used most commonly to treat colds, and is frequently made into a tea. Today, many families still use wild bergamot during the cold and flu season. The tea may be sweetened with honey, as it tends to be quite strong.

The species of Monarda that may go under the common name "bee balm," including M. fistulosa, have a long history of use as a medicinal plant by Native Americans, including the Blackfoot. The Blackfoot recognized the plant's strong antiseptic action, and used poultices of the plant for skin infections and minor wounds. A tea made from the plant was also used to treat mouth and throat infections caused by dental caries and gingivitis. Bee balm is the natural source of the antiseptic thymol, the primary active ingredient in modern commercial mouthwash formulas. The Winnebago used a tea made from bee balm as a general stimulant. Bee balm was also used as a carminative herb by Native Americans to treat excessive flatulence. Leaves were eaten boiled with meat and a concoction of the plant was made into hair pomade. The herb is considered an active diaphoretic (sweat inducer).

The essential oil of Monarda fistulosa was analyzed using mass spectrometry and arithmetical retention indices, and was found to contain p-cymene (32.5%), carvacrol (24.0%), thymol (12.6%), an aliphatic aldehyde (6.3%), the methyl ether of carvacrol (5.5%), α-pinene (3.5%), β-pinene (2.9%), sabinene hydrate (1.9%), α-terpinene (1.7%), citronellyl acetate (1.6%), and β-caryophyllene (1.1%).

M. fistulosa distillate has been proposed as an antimicrobial agent in laboratory settings, specifically as an agent in artificial media used for growth of tachinid fly larvae.

== Ecology ==
As a honey plant, it is popular with a variety of pollinators, including bees, hummingbirds, and lepidoptera. It is a larval host to the hermit sphinx, orange mint moth, and raspberry pyrausta.

== See also ==
- List of honey plants
