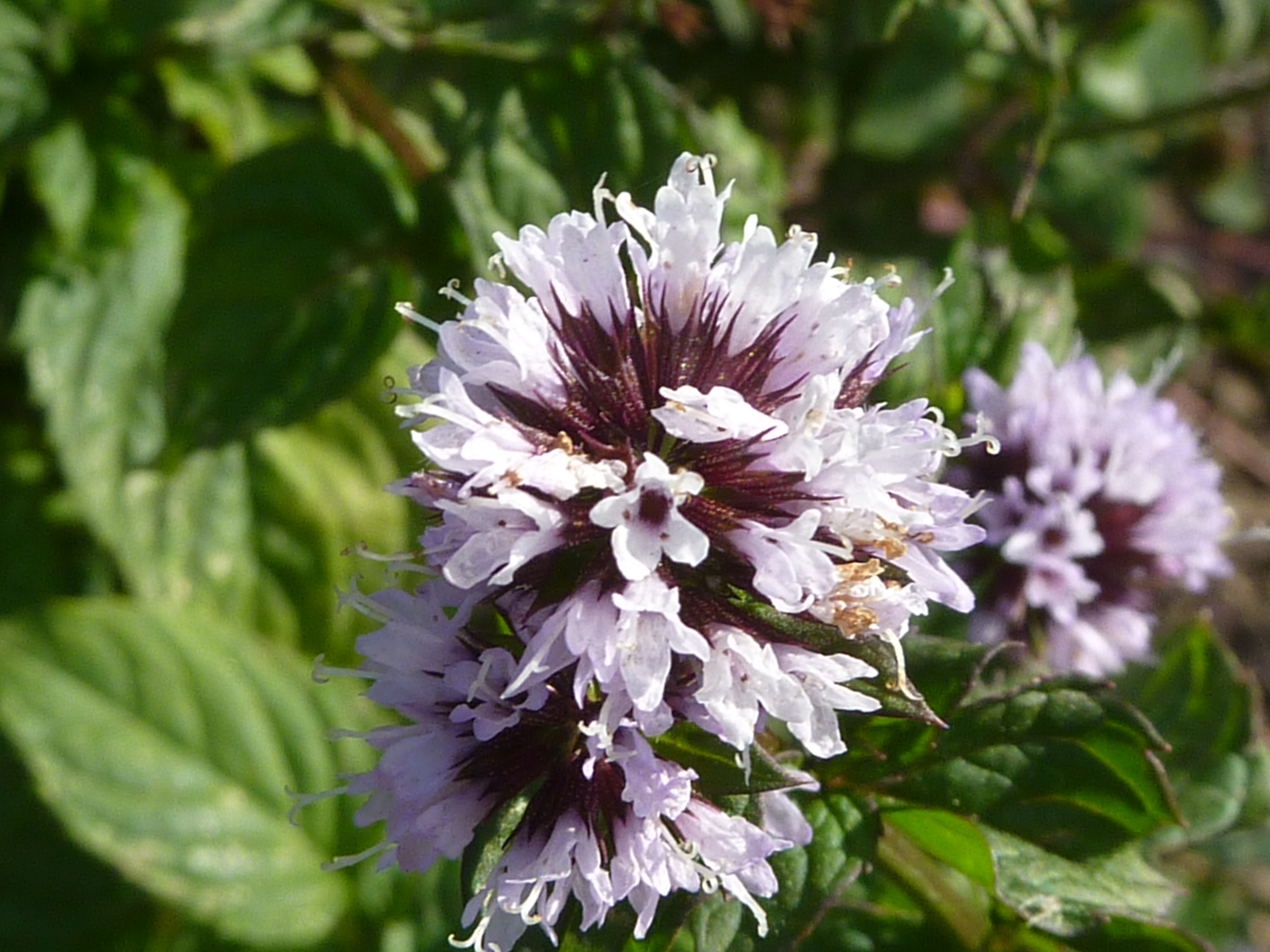

Scientific classification
- Kingdom: Plantae
- Clade: Tracheophytes
- Clade: Angiosperms
- Clade: Eudicots
- Clade: Asterids
- Order: Lamiales
- Family: Lamiaceae
- Genus: Mentha
- Species: M. aquatica
- Variety: M. a. var. citrata

Trinomial name
- Mentha aquatica var. citrata (Ehrh.) W.C.Werner

Synonyms
- Mentha citrata Ehrh.; Mentha aquatica f. citrata (Ehrh.) Fresen.; Mentha aquatica var. glabrata W.D.J.Koch in J.C.Röhling, nom. superfl.; Mentha × piperita subsp. citrata (Ehrh.) Briq.; Mentha × piperita var. citrata (Ehrh.) Fresen.

= Eau de Cologne mint =

Variety of flowering plant

Eau de Cologne mint, also known as orange mint and bergamot mint, is a cultivated mint. In a 1970 study, most plants were found to be male sterile forms of Mentha aquatica, so were regarded as Mentha aquatica var. citrata, although in England the hybrid Mentha × piperita was found. The Royal Horticultural Society treats Eau de Cologne mint as Mentha × piperita f. citrata. The World Checklist of Selected Plant Families sinks both scientific names into Mentha aquatica.

== Description ==
Eau de Cologne mint has a strong odor due to the two chemical constituents, linalyl acetate (45%) and linalool (45–50%), which make up around 90% of the oil. Kiran, a high-yielding variety, produces 150 kg of oil/ha while keeping 45% of linalool. It is grown mainly in subtropical, fertile land such as northern India. The oil is mainly used in the perfumery industry.

== Medicinal uses ==
A tea made from the fresh or dried leaves of the plant has traditionally been used to treat stomach aches, nausea, parasites and nerves.
