= Autocomplete =

Computing feature predicting ending to a word a user is typing

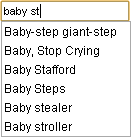
Example of the partially typed search term baby st being autocompleted to various options

Autocomplete, or word completion, is a feature in which an application predicts the rest of a word a user is typing. In Android and iOS smartphones, this is called predictive text. In graphical user interfaces, users can typically press the tab key to accept a suggestion or the down arrow key to accept one of several.

Autocomplete speeds up human-computer interactions when it correctly predicts the word a user intends to enter after only a few characters have been typed into a text input field. It works best in domains with a limited number of possible words (such as in command line interpreters), when some words are much more common (such as when addressing an e-mail), or writing structured and predictable text (as in source code editors).

Many autocomplete algorithms learn new words after the user has written them a few times, and can suggest alternatives based on the learned habits of the individual user.

== Definition ==
=== Original purpose ===
The original purpose of word prediction software was to help people with physical disabilities increase their typing speed, as well as to help them decrease the number of keystrokes needed in order to complete a word or a sentence. The need to increase speed is noted by the fact that people who use speech-generating devices generally produce speech at a rate that is less than 10% as fast as people who use oral speech. But the function is also very useful for anybody who writes text, particularly people–such as medical doctors–who frequently use long, hard-to-spell terminology that may be technical or medical in nature.

=== Description ===
Autocomplete or word completion works so that when the writer writes the first letter or letters of a word, the program predicts one or more possible words as choices. If the intended word is included in the list, the writer can select it, for example, by using the number keys. If the word that the user wants is not predicted, the writer must enter the next letter of the word. At this time, the word choice(s) is altered so that the words provided begin with the same letters as those that have been selected. When the word that the user wants appears it is selected, and the word is inserted into the text. In another form of word prediction, words most likely to follow the just written one are predicted, based on recent word pairs used. Word prediction uses language modeling, where within a set vocabulary the words are most likely to occur are calculated. Along with language modeling, basic word prediction on AAC devices is often coupled with a frecency model, where words the AAC user has used recently and frequently are more likely to be predicted. Word prediction software often also allows the user to enter their own words into the word prediction dictionaries either directly, or by "learning" words that have been written. Some search returns related to genitals or other vulgar terms are often omitted from autocompletion technologies, as are morbid terms

== History ==
The autocomplete and predictive text technology was invented by Chinese scientists and linguists in the 1950s to solve the input inefficiency of the Chinese typewriter, as the typing process involved finding and selecting thousands of logographic characters on a tray, drastically slowing down the word processing speed.

In the 1950s, typists came to rearrange the character layout from the standard dictionary layout to groups of common words and phrases. Chinese typewriter engineers innovated mechanisms to access common characters accessible at the fastest speed possible by word prediction, a technique used today in Chinese input methods for computers, and in text messaging in many languages. According to Stanford University historian Thomas Mullaney, the development of modern Chinese typewriters from the 1960s to 1970s influenced the development of modern computer word processors and affected the development of computers themselves.

== Types of autocomplete tools ==
There are standalone tools that add autocomplete functionality to existing applications. These programs monitor user keystrokes and suggest a list of words based on first typed letter(s). Examples are Typingaid and Letmetype. LetMeType, freeware, is no longer developed. The author has published the source code and allows anybody to continue development. TypingAid, also freeware, is actively developed. IntelliComplete, available as both freeware and payware, works only in certain programs which hook into the IntelliComplete server program. The first autocomplete software was Smartype, which dates back to the late 1980s and is still available today. It was initially developed for medical transcriptionists working in WordPerfect for MS/DOS, but it now functions for any application in any Windows or Web-based program.

=== Autocorrection ===
Autocorrection is a related feature that involves automatic replacement of a particular string with another one, usually one that is longer and harder to type, such as "myname" with "Lee John Nikolai François Al Rahman". This can also quietly fix simple typing errors, such as turning "teh" into "the". Several autocomplete programs, standalone or integrated in text editors, based on word lists, also include a shorthand function for often-used phrases.

=== Context completion ===
Context completion is a text editor feature, similar to word completion, which completes words (or entire phrases) based on the current context and context of other similar words within the same document, or within some training data set. The main advantage of context completion is the ability to predict anticipated words more precisely and even with no initial letters. The main disadvantage is the need of a training data set, which is typically larger for context completion than for simpler word completion. Most common use of context completion is seen in advanced programming language editors and IDEs, where training data set is inherently available and context completion makes more sense to the user than broad word completion would.

Line completion is a type of context completion, first introduced by Juraj Simlovic in TED Notepad in July 2006. The context in line completion is the current line while the current document poses as a training dataset. When the user begins a line that starts with a frequently-used phrase, the editor automatically completes it up to the position where similar lines differ or proposes a list of common continuations.

== Software integration ==
=== In web browsers ===
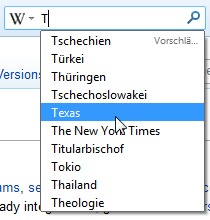
Autocomplete of the search box in Mozilla Firefox

In web browsers, autocomplete is done in the address bar (using items from the browser's history) and in text boxes on frequently used pages, such as a search engine's search box. Autocomplete for web addresses is particularly convenient because the full addresses are often long and difficult to type correctly.

==== In web forms ====
Autocompletion or "autofill" is frequently found in web browsers, used to fill in web forms automatically. When a user inputs data into a form and subsequently submits it, the web browser will often save the form's contents by default.

This feature is commonly used to fill in login credentials. However, when a password field is detected, the web browser will typically ask the user for explicit confirmation before saving the password in its password store, often secured with a built-in password manager to allow the use of a "master password" before credentials can be autofilled.

Most of the time, such as in Internet Explorer and Google Toolbar, the entries depend on the form field's name, so as to not enter street names in a last name field or vice versa. For this use, proposed names for such form fields, in earlier HTML 5 specifications this RFC is no longer referenced, thus leaving the selection of names up to each browser's implementation.

Certain web browsers such as Opera automatically autofill credit card information and addresses.

An individual webpage may enable or disable browser autofill by default. This is done in HTML with the autocomplete attribute in a <form> element or its corresponding form elements.

<!-- Autocomplete turned on by default -->
<form autocomplete="on">

  <!-- This form element has autocomplete turned on -->
  <input name="username" autocomplete="on">

  <!-- While this one inherits its parent form's value -->
  <input name="password" type="password">
</form>

It has been shown that the autofill feature of modern browsers can be exploited in a phishing attack with the use of hidden form fields, which allows personal information such as the user's phone number to be collected.

HTML has a datalist element that can be used to feed an input element with autocompletions.

<label for="ice-cream-choice">Choose a flavor:</label>
<input list="ice-cream-flavors" id="ice-cream-choice" name="ice-cream-choice" />

<datalist id="ice-cream-flavors">
  <option value="Chocolate"></option>
  <option value="Coconut"></option>
  <option value="Mint"></option>
  <option value="Strawberry"></option>
  <option value="Vanilla"></option>
</datalist>

=== In desktop applications ===
In desktop applications, autocomplete assists users by predicting and completing text as they type. It is commonly used in writing assistants, code editors, office software, note-taking applications, messaging clients, and other productivity tools to reduce typing effort, increase writing speed, and improve consistency. Modern AI-powered autocomplete systems can generate context-aware word, phrase, or sentence completions based on the surrounding text and the user’s current task.

=== In e-mail programs ===
In e-mail programs autocomplete is typically used to fill in the e-mail addresses of the intended recipients. Generally, there are a small number of frequently-used e-mail addresses, hence it is relatively easy to use autocomplete to select among them. Like web addresses, e-mail addresses are often long, making typing them completely inconvenient.

For instance, Microsoft Outlook Express will find addresses based on the name that is used in the address book. Google's Gmail will find addresses by any string that occurs in the address or stored name.

=== In retail and e-commerce websites ===
Autocomplete, often called predictive search, is used to suggest relevant products, categories, or queries as a shopper types into the search bar. This feature helps reduce typing effort and guides users toward popular or high-converting search terms. Many e-commerce systems generate these suggestions dynamically, based on recent search data or trending products, to improve both speed and discoverability.

=== In search engines ===
In search engines, autocomplete user interface features provide users with suggested queries or results as they type their query in the search box. This is also commonly called autosuggest or incremental search. This type of search often relies on matching algorithms that forgive entry errors such as phonetic Soundex algorithms or the language independent Levenshtein algorithm. The challenge remains to search large indices or popular query lists in under a few milliseconds so that the user sees results pop up while typing.

Autocomplete can have an adverse effect on individuals and businesses when negative search terms are suggested when a search takes place. Autocomplete has now become a part of reputation management as companies linked to negative search terms such as scam, complaints and fraud seek to alter the results. Google in particular have listed some of the aspects that affect how their algorithm works, but this is an area that is open to manipulation.

=== In source code editors ===
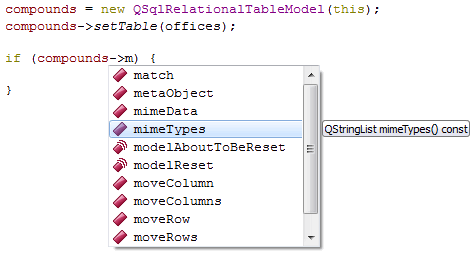
Code completion in Qt Creator 5.0: The programmer types some code, and when the software detects a recognizable string such as a variable identifier or class name it presents a menu to the programmer which contains the complete name of the identified variable or the methods applicable to the detected class, and the programmer makes a choice with her or his mouse or with the keyboard arrow keys. If the programmer continues typing without making a choice, then the menu disappears.

Autocompletion of source code is also known as code completion. In a source code editor, autocomplete is greatly simplified by the regular structure of the programming language. There are usually only a limited number of words meaningful in the current context or namespace, such as names of variables and functions. An example of code completion is Microsoft's IntelliSense design. It involves showing a pop-up list of possible completions for the current input prefix to allow the user to choose the right one. This is particularly useful in object-oriented programming because often the programmer will not know exactly what members a particular class has. Therefore, autocomplete then serves as a form of convenient documentation as well as an input method.

Another beneficial feature of autocomplete for source code is that it encourages the programmer to use longer, more descriptive variable names, hence making the source code more readable. Typing large words which may contain camel case like numberOfWordsPerParagraph can be difficult, but autocomplete allows a programmer to complete typing the word using a fraction of the keystrokes.

=== In database query tools ===
Autocompletion in database query tools allows the user to autocomplete the table names in an SQL statement and column names of the tables referenced in the SQL statement. As text is typed into the editor, the context of the cursor within the SQL statement provides an indication of whether the user needs a table completion or a table column completion. The table completion provides a list of tables available in the database server the user is connected to. The column completion provides a list of columns for only tables referenced in the SQL statement. SQL Server Management Studio provides autocomplete in query tools.

=== In word processors ===
In many word processing programs, autocompletion decreases the amount of time spent typing repetitive words and phrases. The source material for autocompletion is either gathered from the rest of the current document or from a list of common words defined by the user. Currently Apache OpenOffice, Calligra Suite, KOffice, LibreOffice and Microsoft Office include support for this kind of autocompletion, as do advanced text editors such as Emacs and Vim.

- Apache OpenOffice Writer and LibreOffice Writer have a working word completion program that proposes words previously typed in the text, rather than from the whole dictionary
- Microsoft Excel spreadsheet application has a working word completion program that proposes words previously typed in upper cells

=== In command-line interpreters ===
Command-line completion in PowerShell

In a command-line interpreter, such as Unix's sh or bash, or Windows's cmd.exe or PowerShell, or in similar command line interfaces, autocomplete of command names and file names may be accomplished by keeping track of all the possible names of things the user may access. Here autocomplete is usually done by pressing the Tab ↹ key after typing the first several letters of the word. For example, if the only file in the current directory that starts with x is xLongFileName, the user may prefer to type x and autocomplete to the complete name. If there were another file name or command starting with x in the same scope, the user would type more letters or press the Tab key repeatedly to select the appropriate text.

== Efficiency ==
=== Research ===
Although research has shown that word prediction software does decrease the number of keystrokes needed and improves the written productivity of children with disabilities, there are mixed results as to whether or not word prediction actually increases speed of output. It is thought that the reason why word prediction does not always increase the rate of text entry is because of the increased cognitive load and requirement to move eye gaze from the keyboard to the monitor.

In order to reduce this cognitive load, parameters such as reducing the list to five likely words, and having a vertical layout of those words may be used. The vertical layout is meant to keep head and eye movements to a minimum, and also gives additional visual cues because the word length becomes apparent. Although many software developers believe that if the word prediction list follows the cursor, that this will reduce eye movements, in a study of children with spina bifida by Tam, Reid, O'Keefe & Nauman (2002) it was shown that typing was more accurate, and that the children also preferred when the list appeared at the bottom edge of the screen, at the midline. Several studies have found that word prediction performance and satisfaction increases when the word list is closer to the keyboard, because of the decreased amount of eye-movements needed.

Software with word prediction is produced by multiple manufacturers. The software can be bought as an add-on to common programs such as Microsoft Word (for example, WordQ+SpeakQ, Typing Assistant, Co:Writer, Wivik, Ghotit Dyslexia), or as one of many features on an AAC device (PRC's Pathfinder, Dynavox Systems, Saltillo's ChatPC products). Some well known programs: Intellicomplete, which is available in both a freeware and a payware version, but works only with programs which are made to work with it. Letmetype and Typingaid are both freeware programs which work in any text editor.

An early version of autocompletion was described in 1967 by H. Christopher Longuet-Higgins in his Computer-Assisted Typewriter (CAT), "such words as 'BEGIN' or 'PROCEDURE' or identifiers introduced by the programmer, would be automatically completed by the CAT after the programmer had typed only one or two symbols."

== See also ==
- Autocorrection – Feature on word processors to automatically correct misspelled words, automatic correction of misspelled words.
- Autofill – Computing feature predicting ending to a word a user is typing
- Combo box – User interface element
- Context-sensitive user interface – Concept in human-computer interaction
- GitHub Copilot – Artificial intelligence tool
- Google Feud – Website game
- Incremental search – User interface method to search for text
- OpenSearch (specification) – Protocols for syndicating search results
- Predictive text – Input technology for mobile phone keypads
- Qwerty effect – Proposed association between keyboard position and the emotional meanings of words
- Search suggest drop-down list – Query feature used in computing
- Snippet – Small amount of source code used for productivity
