= Universal Design for Learning =

Educational framework

Universal Design for Learning (UDL) is an educational framework based on research in learning theory, including cognitive neuroscience, that guides the development of flexible learning environments and learning spaces that can accommodate individual learning differences.

Universal Design for Learning is a set of principles that provide teachers with a structure to develop instructions to meet the diverse needs of all learners.

The UDL framework, first defined by David H. Rose, Ed.D. of the Harvard Graduate School of Education and the Center for Applied Special Technology (CAST) in the 1990s, calls for creating a curriculum from the outset that provides:

- Multiple means of representation give learners various ways of acquiring information and knowledge,
- Multiple means of expression to provide learners alternatives for demonstrating what they know, and
- Multiple means of engagement to tap into learners' interests, challenge them appropriately, and motivate them to learn.

In 2024, CAST released Version 3.0 of the Universal Design for Learning Guidelines. The updated guidelines place greater emphasis on learner agency and propose measures to address barriers caused by bias and exclusion. The guidelines continue to structure the UDL framework around three core areas: Engagement, Representation, and Action & Expression.

Curriculum, as defined in the UDL literature, has four parts: instructional goals, methods, materials, and assessments. UDL is intended to increase access to learning by reducing physical, cognitive, intellectual, and organizational barriers to learning, as well as other obstacles. UDL principles also lend themselves to implementing inclusionary practices in the classroom.

Universal Design for Learning is referred to by name in American legislation, such as the Higher Education Opportunity Act (HEOA) of 2008 (Public Law 110-315), the 2004 reauthorization of the Individuals with Disabilities Education Act (IDEA), and the Assistive Technology Act of 1998. The emphasis is placed on equal access to curriculum by all students and the accountability required by IDEA 2004 and No Child Left Behind legislation has presented a need for a practice that will accommodate all learners.

== Origins ==
The concept and language of Universal Design for Learning was inspired by the universal design movement in architecture and product development, originally formulated by Ronald L. Mace at North Carolina State University. Universal design calls for "the design of products and environments to be usable by all people, to the greatest extent possible, without the need for adaptation or specialized design". UDL applies this general idea to learning: that curriculum should, from the outset, be designed to accommodate all kinds of learners. Educators have to be deliberate in the teaching and learning process in the classroom (e.g., Preparing class learning profiles for each student). This will enable grouping by interest. Those students that have challenges will be given special assistance. This will enable specific multimedia to meet the needs of all students. However, recognizing that the UD principles created to guide the design of things (e.g., buildings, products) are not adequate for the design of social interactions (e.g., human learning environments), researchers at CAST looked to the neurosciences and theories of progressive education in developing the UDL principles. In particular, the work of Lev Vygotsky and, less directly, Benjamin Bloom informed the three-part UDL framework.

Some educational initiatives, such as Universal Design for Instruction (UDI) and Universal Instructional Design (UID), adapt the Mace principles for products and environments to learning environments, primarily at the postsecondary level. While these initiatives are similar to UDL, and have, in some cases, compatible goals, they are not equivalent to UDL and the terms are not interchangeable; they refer to distinct frameworks. On the other hand, UDI practices promoted by the DO-IT Center operationalize both UD and UDL principles to help educators maximize the learning of all students.

== Implementation initiatives in the US ==
In 2006, representatives from more than two dozen educational and disability organizations in the US formed the National Universal Design for Learning Taskforce. The goal was to raise awareness of UDL among national, state, and local policymakers.

The organizations represented in the National Task Force on UDL include the National School Boards Association, the National Education Association (NEA), the American Federation of Teachers (AFT), the National Association of State Directors of Special Education (NASDSE), the Council of Chief State School Officers (CCSSO), the National Down Syndrome Society (NDSS), the Council for Learning Disabilities (CLD), the Council for Exceptional Children (CEC), the National Center for Learning Disabilities (NCLD), the National Association of Secondary School Principals (NASSP), Easter Seals, American Foundation for the Blind (AFB), Association on Higher Education and Disability, Higher Education Consortium for Special Education (HECSE), American Occupational Therapy Association, National Association of State Boards of Education (NASBE), National Down Syndrome Congress (NDSC), Learning Disabilities Association of America (LDA), TASH, the Arc of the United States, the Vocational Evaluation and Career Assessment Professionals Association (VECAP), the National Cerebral Palsy Association, and the Advocacy Institute.

Activities have included sponsoring a Congressional staff briefing on UDL in February 2007 and supporting efforts to include UDL in major education legislation for both K–12 and postsecondary.

== Implementation initiatives in Ireland ==
In Ireland, Universal Design for Learning has been promoted in further and higher education through national professional development and access initiatives. Since 2019, AHEAD, University College Dublin Access and Lifelong Learning, and the National Forum for the Enhancement of Teaching and Learning in Higher Education have awarded Digital Badges in Universal Design, a free national introductory course for staff in further and higher education. AHEAD states that more than 5,000 badges have been awarded.

The Higher Education Authority has also funded Universal Design initiatives through the Programme for Access to Higher Education. Under PATH 4 Phase 1, a €3 million Universal Design Fund was allocated to higher education institutions for 2022–2024 to support the embedding of Universal Design approaches and inclusive practices, particularly for neurodiverse students and students with intellectual disabilities. The HEA-funded ALTITUDE project produced a National Charter for Universal Design in Tertiary Education, developed through a cross-sector collaboration involving national agencies, higher education institutions and Education and Training Board representatives.

== Research ==
Research evidence on UDL is complicated as it is hard to isolate UDL from other pedagogical practices. For example, Coppola et al. (2019) combine UDL with culturally sustaining pedagogy, and Phuong and Berkeley (2017) combine it with adaptive equity-oriented pedagogy (AEP). Coppola et al. provide phenomenological evidence that learners with a variety of needs find UDL helpful for their learning. Phuong and Berkeley, using a randomized controlled trial, found that AEP, which is based on UDL, led to a significant improvement in students' grades, even when several confounding variables were controlled for.

Baumann and Melle (2019) report in a small-scale study of 89 students, 73 without specific educational needs and 16 with specific educational needs, that the inclusion of UDL enhanced both student groups' performance and their enjoyment of the learning experience.

== Assistive technology ==
Assistive technology (AT) is a pedagogical approach that can be used to enforce universal design for learning (UDL) in the inclusive classroom. AT and UDL can be theorized as two ends of a spectrum, where AT is on one end addressing personal or individual student needs, and UDL is on the other end concerned with classroom needs and curriculum design. Around the center of this spectrum, AT and UDL overlap such that student individual needs are addressed within the context of the larger curriculum, ideally without segregation or exclusion. UDL provides educators with the framework for an educational curriculum that addresses students' diverse learning styles and interests via AT.

According to the Technology-Related Assistance to Individuals with Disabilities Act of 1988 and the Individuals with Disabilities Education Act of 2004, AT includes AT devices and services. AT devices are physical hardware, equipment, or software used to improve a person's cognitive, emotional, and/or behavioral experience. These devices differ from medical ones which may be implanted surgically. AT services aid a person in choosing and/or using AT devices.

=== Types ===
==== Low-tech ====
Assistive technology devices can be characterized as low-tech, mid-tech, or high-tech. Low-tech devices are low in cost and students who use them do not usually need to participate in training. Low-tech devices include graphic organizers, visual aids, grid or stylized paper, and pencil grips, among others. Low-tech AT would be a first step in addressing a student's needs.

==== Mid-tech ====
Should students require additional support, educators can try implementing mid-tech devices, which do not necessarily require additional training and usually function with a power source, but are more affordable than their high-tech alternative. Mid-tech devices include audiobooks, simple-phrase communication software, predictive text software (ex: WordQ), and some tablets.

==== High-tech ====
High-tech devices are more complex types of AT. These devices are higher in cost and require extensive user training. Some examples of high-tech devices are text-to-speech and speech-to-text software, wheelchairs with alternative navigation software, and alternative mouse software. It is important to provide students and their families with low-cost recommendations for high-cost devices.

=== Implementation ===
The variety of assistive technology is what supports teachers in implementing universal design for learning (UDL) in their classrooms. The UDL framework promotes a flexible curriculum, which would be further supported by the implementation of various assistive technologies depending on the need of the student. For example, a student struggling in a language course might need digital AT to assist them in initiating or cueing the development of their ideas. However, from a UDL perspective, the teacher recognizes that the current version of the curriculum does not acknowledge forms of expression aside from manual writing. The teacher can adjust the curriculum to adapt to the needs of the students and implement AT to assist each individual student with their unique learning needs.

Research shows that the use of physical or virtual manipulatives improves academic performance in students, but it is difficult to compare results between classrooms since each classroom differs in how they implement assistive technology. Generally, teachers and other staff members need to consider the students' internal and external factors when implementing AT devices or services. Internal factors involve assessing the individual needs of the student, sometimes with neuropsychological testing by the school's professional staff, and deciding what type of AT addresses their need. External factors involve considering whether the classroom environment and the student's home environment can support the implementation of the AT including space requirements and training for teachers, students, and their families. More resources and attention need to be allocated towards teacher and staff training in using AT to support UDL practices in the classroom.
