= List of Firefox features =

Features of the Firefox web browser

Mozilla Firefox has features which distinguish it from other web browsers, such as Google Chrome, Safari, and Microsoft Edge.

== Major differences ==
To avoid interface bloat, ship a relatively smaller core customizable to meet individual users' needs, and allow for corporate or institutional extensions to meet their varying policies, Firefox relies on a robust extension system to allow users to modify the browser according to their requirements instead of providing all features in the standard distribution.

While Opera and Google Chrome do the same, extensions for these are fewer in number as of late 2013. Internet Explorer also has an extension system but it is less widely supported than that of others. Developers supporting multiple browsers almost always support Firefox, and in many instances exclusively. As Opera has a policy of deliberately including more features in the core as they prove useful, the market for extensions is relatively unstable but also there is less need for them. The sheer number of extensions is not a good guide to the capabilities of a browser.

Protocol support and the difficulty of adding new link type protocols also vary widely across not only these browsers but across versions of these browsers. Opera has historically been most robust and consistent about supporting cutting-edge protocols such as robust file sharing eDonkey links or bitcoin transactions. These can be difficult to support in Firefox without relying on unknown small developers, which defeats the privacy purpose of these protocols. Instructions for supporting new link protocols vary widely across operating systems and Firefox versions, and are generally not implementable by end users who lack systems administration comfort and the ability to follow exact detailed instructions to type in strings.

== Web technologies support ==
Firefox supports most basic Web standards including HTML, XML, XHTML, CSS (with extensions), JavaScript, DOM, MathML, SVG, XSLT and XPath. Firefox's standards support and growing popularity have been credited as one reason Internet Explorer 7 was to be released with improved standards support.

Since Web standards are often in contradiction with Internet Explorer's behaviors, Firefox, like other browsers, has a quirks mode. This mode attempts to mimic Internet Explorer's quirks modes, which equates to using obsolete rendering standards dating back to Internet Explorer 5, or alternately newer peculiarities introduced in IE 6 or 7. However, it is not completely compatible. Because of the differing rendering, PC World notes that a minority of pages do not work in Firefox, however Internet Explorer 7's quirks mode does not either.

CNET notes that Firefox does not support ActiveX controls by default, which can also cause webpages to be missing features or to not work at all in Firefox. Mozilla made the decision to not support ActiveX due to potential security vulnerabilities, its proprietary nature and its lack of cross-platform compatibility. There are methods of using ActiveX in Firefox such as via third-party plugins but they do not work in all versions of Firefox or on all platforms.

Beginning on December 8, 2006, Firefox Nightly builds pass the Acid2 CSS standards compliance test, so all future releases of Firefox 3 would pass the test.

Firefox also implements a proprietary protocol from Google called "safebrowsing", which is not an open standard.

== Cross-platform support ==
Unsupported versions for old operating systems		Version
Apple; Mac OS X	v10.1	1.0.8
Apple; Mac OS X	v10.2-10.3	2.0.0.20
Apple; Mac OS X	v10.4-10.5 (PPC)	3.6.28
OS/2 and eComStation		3.5.4
Microsoft; Windows	95	1.5.0.12
Microsoft; Windows	NT 4/98/ME	2.0.0.20
Microsoft; Windows	2000	12.0 and 10.0.12esr

Mozilla Firefox runs on certain platforms that coincide OS versions in use at the time of release. In 2004 version 1 supported older operating systems such as Windows 95 and Mac OS X 10.1, by 2008 version 3 required at least OS X 10.4 and even Windows 98 support ended.

Various releases available on the primary distribution site can support the following operating systems, although not always the latest Firefox version.

- Various versions of Microsoft Windows, including 98, 98SE, ME, NT 4.0, 2000, XP, Server 2003, Vista, 7, 8 and 10.
- OS X
- Linux-based operating systems using X.Org Server or XFree86

Builds for Solaris (x86 and SPARC), contributed by the Sun Beijing Desktop Team, are available on the Mozilla web site.

Mozilla Firefox 1.x installation on Windows 95 requires a few additional steps.

Since Firefox is open source and Mozilla actively develops a platform independent abstraction for its graphical front end, it can also be compiled and run on a variety of other architectures and operating systems. Thus, Firefox is also available for many other systems. This includes OS/2, AIX, and FreeBSD. Builds for Windows XP Professional x64 Edition are also available. Mozilla Firefox is also the browser of choice for a good number of smaller operating systems, such as SkyOS and ZETA.

Firefox uses the same profile format on the different platforms, so a profile may be used on multiple platforms, if all of the platforms can access the same profile; this includes, for example, profiles stored on an NTFS (via FUSE) or FAT32 partition accessible from both Windows and Linux, or on a USB flash drive. This is useful for users who dual-boot their machines. However, it may cause a few problems, especially with extensions.

== Security ==
Firefox is free-libre software, and thus in particular its source code is visible to everyone. This allows anyone to review the code for security vulnerabilities. It also allowed the U.S. Department of Homeland Security to give funding for the automated tool Coverity to be run against Firefox code.

Additionally, Mozilla has a security bug bounty system - anyone who reports a valid critical security bug receives a $3000 (US) cash reward for each report and a Mozilla T-shirt. With effect from December 15, 2010, Mozilla added Web Applications to its Security Bug Bounty Program.

== Tabbed browsing ==
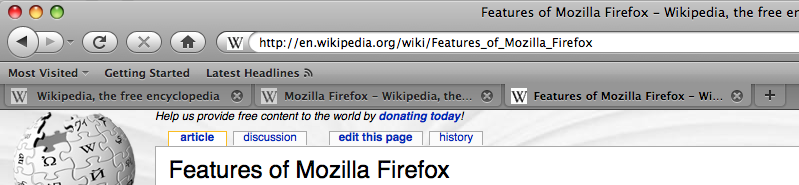
An example of Firefox with three tabs

Firefox supports tabbed browsing, which allows users to open several pages in one window. This feature was carried over from the Mozilla Application Suite, which in turn had borrowed the feature from the popular MultiZilla extension for Mozilla.

Firefox also permits the "homepage" to be a list of URLs delimited with vertical bars (|), which are automatically opened in separate tabs, rather than a single page.

Firefox 2 supports more tabbed browsing features, including a "tab overflow" solution that keeps the user's tabs easily accessible when they would otherwise become illegible, a "session store" which lets the user keep the opened tabs across the restarts, and an "undo close tab" feature.

The tab browsing feature allows users to open multiple tabs or pages on one window. This is convenient for users who enjoy browsing from one window and is also advantageous in ensuring ease of browsing. The tabs are easily made accessible and users can close tabs that are not in use for better usability.

== Pop-up blocking ==
Firefox also includes integrated customizable pop-up blocking. Firefox was given this feature early in beta development, and it was a major comparative selling point of the browser until Internet Explorer gained the capability in the Windows XP SP2 release of August 25, 2004. Firefox's pop-up blocking can be turned off entirely to allow pop-ups from all sites. Firefox's pop-up blocking can be inconvenient at times — it prevents JavaScript-based links from opening a new window while a page is loading unless the site is added to a "safe list" found in the options menu.

In many cases, it is possible to view the pop-up's URL by clicking the dialog that appears when one is blocked. This makes it easier to decide if the pop-up should be displayed.

== Private browsing ==
Private browsing was introduced in Firefox 3.5, which released on June 30, 2009. This feature lets users browse the Internet without leaving any traces in the browsing history.

== Download manager ==
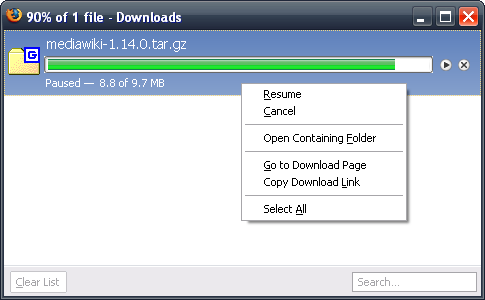
Firefox 3.0.8 Download Manager

An integrated customizable download manager is also included. Downloads can be opened automatically depending on the file type, or saved directly to a disk. By default, Firefox downloads all files to a user's desktop on Mac and Windows or to the user's home directory on Linux, but it can be configured to prompt for a specific download location. Version 3.0 added support for cross-session resuming (stopping a download and resuming it after closing the browser). From within the download manager, a user can view the source URL from which a download originated as well as the location to which a file was downloaded.

== Live bookmarks ==
From 2004, live bookmarks allowed users to dynamically monitor changes to their favorite news sources, using RSS or Atom feeds. Instead of treating RSS-feeds as HTML pages as most news aggregators do, Firefox treated them as bookmarks and automatically updated them in real-time with a link to the appropriate source. In December 2018, version 64.0 of Firefox removed live bookmarks and web feeds, with Mozilla suggesting its replacement by add-ons or other software with news aggregator functionality like Mozilla Thunderbird.

== Other features ==
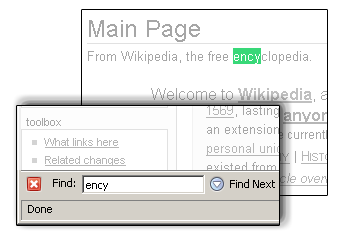
Screenshot of performing "Find as you type". "ency" was being typed and the first matched text was highlighted in green.

=== Find as you type ===
Firefox also has an incremental find feature known as "Find as you type", invoked by pressing Ctrl+F. With this feature enabled, a user can simply begin typing a word while viewing a web page, and Firefox automatically searches for it and highlights the first instance found. As the user types more of the word, Firefox refines its search. Also, if the user's exact query does not appear anywhere on the page, the "Find" box turns red. Ctrl+G can be pressed to go to the next found match. Alternatively the slash (/) key can be used instead to invoke the "quick search". The "quick search", in contrast to the normal search, lacks search controls and is wholly controlled by the keyboard. In this mode highlighted links can be followed by pressing the enter key. The "quick search" has an alternate mode which is invoked by pressing the apostrophe (') key, in this mode only links are matched.

=== Mycroft Web Search ===
A built-in Mycroft Web search function features extensible search-engine listing; by default, Firefox includes plugins for Google and Yahoo!, and also includes plugins for looking up a word on dictionary.com and browsing through Amazon.com listings. Other popular Mycroft search engines include Wikipedia, eBay, and IMDb.

=== OpenSearch Integration ===
When visiting a website that implements OpenSearch, a user can manually add the site as a supported search engine by selecting the option in a context menu.

=== Smart Bookmarks ===
Smart Bookmarks (aka Smart keywords) can be used to quickly search for information on specific Web sites. A smart keyword is defined by the user and can be associated with any bookmark, and can then be used in the address bar as a shortcut to quickly get to the site or, if the smart keyword is linked to a searchbox, to search the site. For example, "imdb" is a pre-defined smart keyword; to search for information about the movie 'Firefox' on IMDb, jump to the location bar with the Ctrl+L shortcut, type "imdb Firefox" and press the Enter key or just simply type in "imdb" if one wants to get to the frontpage instead.

=== Chrome ===
The Chrome packages within Firefox control and implement the Firefox user interface.

== Version 2.0 and above ==
=== Enhanced search capabilities ===
Search term suggestions will now appear as users type in the integrated search box when using the Google, Yahoo! or Answers.com search engines. A new search engine manager makes it easier to add, remove and re-order search engines, and users will be alerted when Firefox encounters a website that offers new search engines that the user may wish to install.

=== Microsummaries ===
Support for Microsummaries was added in version 2.0. Microsummaries are short summaries of web pages that are used to convey more information than page titles. Microsummaries are regularly updated to reflect content changes in web pages so that viewers of the web page will want to revisit the web page after updates. Microsummaries can either be provided by the page, or be generated by the processing of an XSLT stylesheet against the page. In the latter case, the XSLT stylesheet and the page that the microsummary applies to are provided by a microsummary generator. Support for Microsummaries was removed as of Firefox 6.

=== Live Titles ===
When a website offers a microsummary (a regularly updated summary of the most important information on a Web page), users can create a bookmark with a "Live Title". Compact enough to fit in the space available to a bookmark label, they provide more useful information about pages than static page titles, and are regularly updated with the latest information. There are several websites that can be bookmarked with Live Titles, and even more add-ons to generate Live Titles for other popular websites. Support for Live Titles was removed as of Firefox 6.

=== Session Restore ===
The Session Restore feature restores windows, tabs, text typed in forms, and in-progress downloads from the last user session. It will be activated automatically when installing an application update or extension, and users will be asked if they want to resume their previous session after a system crash.

=== Inline spell checker ===
A built-in spell checker enables users to quickly check the spelling of text entered into Web forms without having to use a separate application.

=== Usability in version 2 ===
Firefox 2 was designed for the average user, hiding advanced configuration and making features that do not require user interaction to function. Jim Repoza of eWEEK states:

eWEEK Labs found Firefox 2.0, which can be downloaded at www.mozilla.com, to have the greatest out-of-the-box usability of any Web browser that we have tested (and that's a lot of Web browsers).

Firefox also won UK Usability Professionals' Association's 2005 award for "Best software application".

== Version 3.0 and above ==
=== Star button ===
Quickly add bookmarks from the location bar with a single click; a second click lets the user file and tag them.

== Version 5.0 and above ==
=== Style Inspector ===
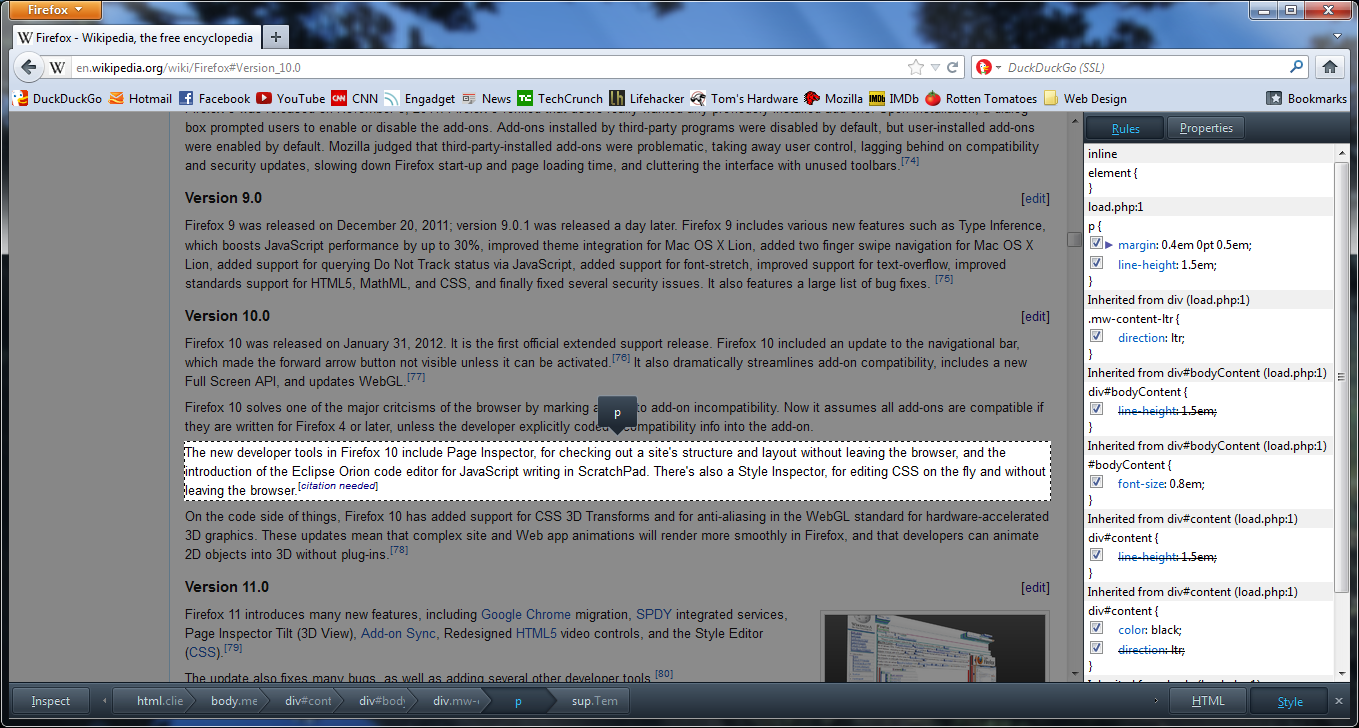
Style Inspector

Firefox 10 added the CSS Style Inspector to the Page Inspector, which allow users to check out a site's structure and edit the CSS without leaving the browser.

Firefox 10 added support for CSS 3D Transforms and for anti-aliasing in the WebGL standard for hardware-accelerated 3D graphics. These updates mean that complex site and Web app animations will render more smoothly in Firefox, and that developers can animate 2D objects into 3D without plug-ins.

=== 3D Page Inspector ===
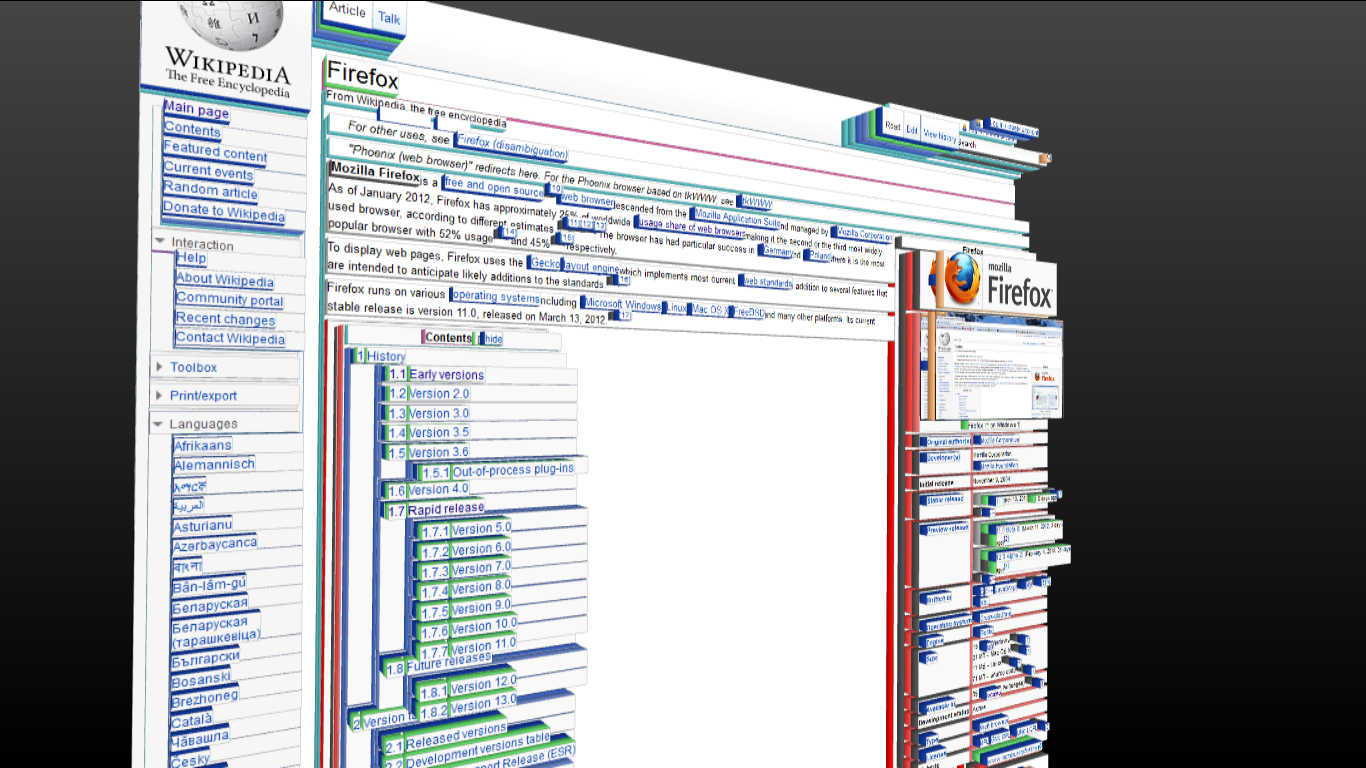
3D Page Inspector

Firefox 11, released January 2012, introduced a tiltable three-dimensional visualization of the Document Object Model (DOM), where more nested elements protrude further from the page surface. This feature was removed with version 47.

== Firefox 57 and above ==
=== Electrolysis and WebExtensions ===
On August 21, 2015, Firefox developers announced that due to planned changes to Firefox's internal operations, including the planned implementation of a new multi-process architecture codenamed "Multiprocess Firefox" or "Electrolysis" (stylized "e10s"). Introduced to some users in version 48, Firefox adopted a new extension architecture known as WebExtensions. WebExtensions uses HTML and JavaScript APIs and is designed to be similar to the extension API used by Google Chrome, and run within a multi-process environment, but does not enable the same level of access to the browser. XPCOM and XUL add-ons are no longer supported effective Firefox 57.

=== HTTPS-only mode ===
Firefox 83 introduced HTTPS-only mode, a security enhancing mode that once enabled forces all connections to websites to use HTTPS.

=== Picture in Picture ===
Released on December 3, 2019, Firefox 71 is the first Firefox release to include Picture-in-picture. At first a Windows only feature, with Mac and Linux support introduced in Firefox 72, picture-in-picture allows users to place a video from a webpage into a small separate window that's viewable regardless of which tab the user is in—including from outside the browser.

=== Credit Card Auto-Fill ===
Firefox 81 allowed users in the US to save, manage, and auto-fill credit card information. Support for more countries have been added since the release. As of 2023, the list of supported countries is: Austria, Belgium, Canada, France, Germany, Italy, Poland, Spain, the U.K. and the U.S.

=== Automatic Local Translation of Webpages ===
Automatic translation of web content, performed entirely locally on device, was introduced to users in Firefox 118. This feature is a joint effort between Mozilla, University of Edinburgh, Charles University, University of Sheffield, and the University of Tartu under the name Project Bergamot. Project Bergamot was funded by the European Union's Horizon 2020 research and innovation programme.

== Tags ==
=== Smart Location Bar ===
Firefox 3 includes a "Smart Location Bar". While most other browsers, such as Internet Explorer, will search through history for matching web sites as the user types a URL into the location bar, the Smart Location Bar will also search through bookmarks for a page with a matching URL. Additionally, Firefox's Smart Location Bar will also search through page titles, allowing the user to type in a relevant keyword, instead of a URL, to find the desired page. Firefox uses frecency and other heuristics to predict which history and bookmark matches the user is most likely to select.

=== Library ===
View, organize and search through bookmarks, tags and browsing history using the new Library window. Create or restore full backups of this data whenever with a few clicks.

=== Smart Bookmark Folders ===
Users can quickly access their most visited bookmarks from the toolbar, or recently bookmarked and tagged pages from the bookmark menu. Smart Bookmark Folders can be created by saving a search query in the Library.

=== Full page zoom ===
From the View menu and via keyboard shortcuts, the new zooming feature lets users zoom in and out of entire pages, scaling the layout, text and images, or optionally only the text size. Zoom settings will be remembered for each site.

=== Text selection improvements ===
In addition to being able to double-click and drag to select text by words; or triple-click and drag to select text by paragraph, Ctrl (Cmd on Mac) can be held down to retain the previous selection and extend it instead of replacing it when doing another selection.

=== Web-based protocol handlers ===
Web applications, such as a user's favorite webmail provider, can now be used instead of desktop applications for handling mail to links from other sites. Similar support is available for other protocols (Web applications will have to first enable this by registering as handlers with Firefox).

== Add-ons and extensions ==
There are six types of add-ons in Firefox: extensions, themes, language packs, plugins, social features and apps. Firefox add-ons may be obtained from the Mozilla Add-ons web site or from other sources.

=== Extensions ===
Firefox users can add features and change functionality in Firefox by installing extensions. Extension functionality is varied; such as those enabling mouse gestures, those that block advertisements, and those that enhance tabbed browsing.

Features that the Firefox developers believe will be used by only a small number of its users are not included in Firefox, but instead left to be implemented as extensions. Many Mozilla Suite features, such as IRC chat (ChatZilla) and calendar have been recreated as Firefox extensions. Extensions are also sometimes a testing ground for features that are eventually integrated to the main codebase. For example, MultiZilla was an extension that provided tabbed browsing when Mozilla lacked that feature.

While extensions provide a high level of customizability, PC World notes the difficulty a casual user would have in finding and installing extensions as compared to their features being available by default.

Most extensions are not created or supported by Mozilla. Malicious extensions have been created. Mozilla provides a repository of extensions that have been reviewed by volunteers and are believed to not contain malware. Since extensions are mostly created by third parties, they do not necessarily go through the same level of testing as official Mozilla products, and they may have bugs or vulnerabilities. Like applications on Android and iOS, Firefox extensions have permission model: for example before installing of extension user must agree that this extension can have access to all webpages, or maybe have permission to manage downloads, or have no special permissions — in such way the extension can be manually activated and interact with current page. From 2019 Firefox, Chromium based browsers (Google Chrome, Edge, Opera, Vivaldi) have the same format of extension: WebExtensions API, this is mean that web extension developed for Google Chrome can be used on Firefox (in most cases), and vice versa.

=== Themes ===
Firefox also supports a variety of themes for changing its appearance. Prior to the release of Firefox 57, themes are simply packages of CSS and image files. From Firefox 57 onwards, themes consist solely of color modifications through the use of CSS. Many themes can be downloaded from the Mozilla Update web site.

=== Language packs ===
Language packs are dictionaries for spell checking of input fields.

=== Plugins ===
Firefox supports plugins based on Netscape Plugin Application Program Interface (NPAPI), i.e. Netscape-style plugins. As a side note, Opera and Internet Explorer 3.0 to 5.0 also support NPAPI.

On June 30, 2004, the Mozilla Foundation, in partnership with Adobe, Apple, Macromedia, Opera, and Sun Microsystems, announced a series of changes to web browser plugins. The then-new API allowed web developers to offer richer web browsing experiences, helping to maintain innovation and standards. The then-new plugin technologies were implemented in the future versions of the Mozilla applications.

Mozilla Firefox 1.5 and later versions include the Java Embedding plugin, which allow Mac OS X users to run Java applets with the then-latest 1.4 and 5.0 versions of Java (the default Java software shipped by Apple is not compatible with any browser, except its own Safari).

=== Apps ===
After the releases of Firefox OS based on stack of web technologies, Mozilla added a feature to install mobile apps on PC using Firefox as base.

=== Customizability ===
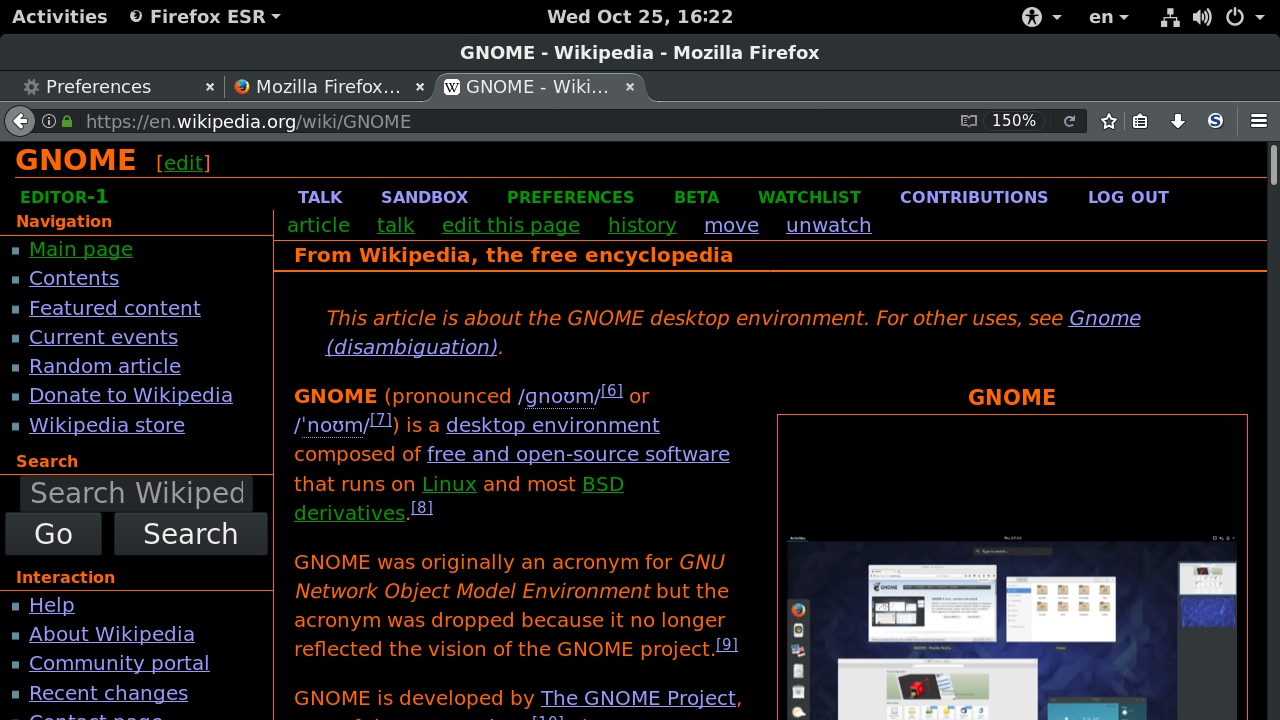
Customized font colors

Beyond the use of Add-ons, Firefox additional customization features.

- The position of the toolbars and interface are customizable
- User stylesheets to change the style of webpages and Firefox's user interface.
- Customizable font colours.

A number of internal configuration options are not accessible in a conventional manner through Firefox's preference dialogs, although they are exposed through its about:config interface.
