= The DO-IT Center =

People with disabilities in postsecondary education and careers

- Founded: 1992
- Founder: Dr. Sheryl Burgstahler
- Headquarters: Seattle, Washington
- Website: doit.uw.edu

The DO-IT (Disabilities, Opportunities, Internetworking, and Technology) Center is based at the University of Washington (UW) in Seattle, Washington. Founded in 1992, DO-IT’s mission is to increase the successful participation of people with disabilities in postsecondary education and careers, in STEM (science, technology, engineering, mathematics) fields and careers, and in computing fields and careers throughout the U.S. It directs the national AccessSTEM program, and co-directs the national AccessComputing Alliance focused on engaging people with disabilities in computing fields.

The Center is a unit of Accessible Technology Services of UW-IT at the University of Washington, a collaboration between the College of Engineering, the College of Education and UW-IT. Primary funding for DO-IT and its projects is provided by the National Science Foundation, the State of Washington, and the U.S. Department of Education. It promotes accessibility and universal design in learning environments and instruction, including Web accessibility, through the online Center for Universal Design in Education (CUDE) and by creating, collecting and distributing publications, training materials, and tutorials for use by educators and faculty throughout the U.S.

The Center works with international institutions and organizations to adapt its practices and programs for international application. For example, the DO-IT Scholars Program has been replicated in Japan as DO-IT Japan, a summer program hosted by the University of Tokyo. South Korea, through the leadership of Seoul National University and Korea Nazarene University, also hosts a similar summer study program in collaboration with the DO-IT Center.

== History ==
The DO-IT Center was founded at the University of Washington in 1992 by Dr. Sheryl Burgstahler with a grant from the National Science Foundation (NSF). Since its inception, DO-IT's mission has been to increase the successful participation of people with disabilities in postsecondary education and careers at local, regional, national (within the United States) and international levels.

In 1992, with funding from NSF, DO-IT launched the first DO-IT Scholars Program. In 1999, the U.S. Department of Education Office of Postsecondary Education (OPE) funded the DO-IT Prof project, which created professional development materials and trained faculty and academic administrators in the U.S. to more fully include students with disabilities in their courses. In 2005, OPE and the NSF funded DO-IT’s AccessCollege project. AccessCollege staff worked with a team of faculty and administrators representing twenty-three two- and four-year institutions in the U.S.; the project included creation of the web-based Center for Universal Design in Education (CUDE), publication of the book Universal Design in Higher Education: From Principles to Practice, and the training manual Building Capacity for a Welcoming and Accessible Postsecondary Institution.

== Programs ==
In 2006, with funding from the NSF, the DO-IT Center partnered with University of Washington's Department of Computer Science and Engineering to launch the AccessComputing Alliance, a nationwide program to increase the participation of people with disabilities in computing fields. In 2006, AccessComputing partners included Gallaudet University in Washington, D.C., Microsoft, the NSF Regional Alliances for Persons with Disabilities in Science, Technology, Engineering and Mathematics (hosted by the University of Southern Maine, New Mexico State University and University of Washington), and American Computing Machinery’s Special Interest Group on Accessible Computing. As of 2013, 32 postsecondary institutions and organizations are partnered with AccessComputing. The program provides summer research programs and internships open to all U.S. students.

The DO-IT Center's programs are centered on the concept of identifying the "critical junctures" students with disabilities face on their path to postsecondary education and careers, and providing resources, projects and programs to help students successfully navigate these critical junctures (e.g., projects to develop STEM interests in students with disabilities at the "critical juncture" between high school and the transition to a four- or two-year postsecondary institution). DO-IT programs for students include AccessComputing, AccessSTEM, the DO-IT Scholars Program (for Washington State students), postsecondary preparation activities, and work-based experiences and internships.

=== Programs for Students with Disabilities ===
The Center serves students with a wide range of disabilities, including (but not limited to):

- visual disabilities - blindness, low vision, and color blindness
- physical disabilities
- cognitive disabilities
- learning disabilities
- deafness and hearing impairments
- traumatic brain injury
- mental disorders.

The DO-IT Center runs a number of programs for students with disabilities. These programs include the nationwide AccessComputing program, the nationwide AccessSTEM program, the DO-IT Scholars Program for Washington State residents, activities with mentors, work-based learning experiences, and internships.

The DO-IT Center describes its programs as helping students with disabilities:

- move through "critical junctures" on their path to postsecondary degrees and careers
- develop self-determination, self-advocacy, and postsecondary education work-readiness skills
- learn to select and use assistive technology, applications software, and Internet resources
- network with peers and adult mentors
- gain requisite knowledge to enter and succeed in postsecondary education.

The DO-IT Center website provides online resources for students with disabilities and their parents, educators, employers, and technology specialists. These resources include the DO-IT Knowledge Base, a searchable, comprehensive online database of articles, case studies and promising practices related to accessibility of technology, postsecondary education, graduate school, and careers. Other DO-IT resources include information about assistive technology, financial aid, and resources for veterans.

=== Center for Universal Design in Education (CUDE) ===
The online Center for Universal Design in Education (CUDE), directed by DO-IT and established in 2005, develops and collects web-based resources to help U.S. and international educators apply universal design to all aspects of education, including applying principles of Universal Design for Instruction and Universal Design for Learning to instruction, and applying universal design to student services, information technology, and physical spaces.

CUDE is funded by grants from the U.S. Department of Education and the National Science Foundation.

=== DO-IT Resources for Educators & Faculty ===
The DO-IT Center provides extensive information, resources, training materials, and tutorials to educators, faculty, and others interested in accessibility and increasing the participation of students with disabilities in postsecondary education. Articles, training materials, and tutorials address a wide range of accessibility issues, including:

- Universal design
- Universal design of instruction
- Accessibility
- Assistive Technology
- Accessible Web design
- Accessibility in Distance Learning
- Accessibility in STEM curricula, classes, labs, and careers
- Accommodation strategies
- Multi-modal methods for presenting classroom material
- Variety of learning styles (e.g. auditory, visual, kinesthetic, experiential, or a combination of styles)
- Evidence-based practices for increasing the participation of students with disabilities.

== Impact ==
The DO-IT Center's AccessSTEM/AccessComputing/DO-IT Longitudinal Transition Study (ALTS) reports positive outcomes for students with disabilities who participate in DO-IT programs, including greater-than-the-national-average participation in STEM fields. DO-IT ALTS participants had a 100% high school completion rate compared to the 70% high school completion rate for youths with disabilities reported by the National Longitudinal Transition Study-2 (NLTS2).

Since 1992, the Center's programs for educators and faculty, which include DO-IT Prof, DO-IT Admin, and AccessCollege, have:

- provided more than 1,000 training sessions to over 25,000 faculty, administrators, and teaching assistants in the U.S. to help them apply universal design to instruction and accommodate students with disabilities
- distributed more than 400,000 publications and videos related to universal design for instruction and accommodating students with disabilities
- reported an increase in grades for students with disabilities in courses taught by faculty trained under the AccessCollege program, in comparison to both students with disabilities taught by the same faculty before training and students with disabilities in similar courses taught by untrained faculty.

The AccessComputing program supports training, experiential learning, and other computing and information technology (IT)-related activities for students with disabilities throughout the U.S. From 2006 - 2013, DO-IT awarded 63 AccessComputing minigrants. Examples of AccessComputing minigrants include providing funding for:

- the purchase of educational software and adaptive technology products for Auburn University's Computer Literacy Academy for Children
- accessibility training and awareness events and conferences at University of Wisconsin-Madison
- research activities and workshops at the Landmark College Institute for Research and Training (LCIRT) at Landmark College
- an additional orientation program for incoming freshman with disabilities at the University of Minnesota, Duluth (UMD) in 2006 and the 2011 Gearing Up for Success Pre-orientation at the Rochester Institute of Technology (RIT) for first year students with Autism Spectrum Disorders
- the 2009 Expanding Access to Computing: Teaching & Design for All Abilities event, led by the Commonwealth Alliance for Information Technology Education (CAITE) and held in conjunction with the Massachusetts STEM Summit.

== Awards ==
Awards for the DO-IT Center include:

- 1995 National Information Infrastructure Award in Education
- 1997 Presidential Award for Excellence in Science, Mathematics, and Engineering Mentoring
- 1999 KCTS 9 Golden Apple Award for excellence in education
- 2001 AHEAD (Association of Higher Education and Disability) Recognition Award for outstanding work for students with disabilities
- 2007 Robert Greenberg Innovation Award for Career Opportunities for Students with Disabilities
- 2011 Hakuho Award for Outstanding Educators and Organizations and the Incentive Award of the Minister of Education, Culture, Sports, Science and Technology (Japan) - presented concurrently with DO-IT Japan
