= Inclusion Catamaran =

Wheelchair-accessible sailing catamaran

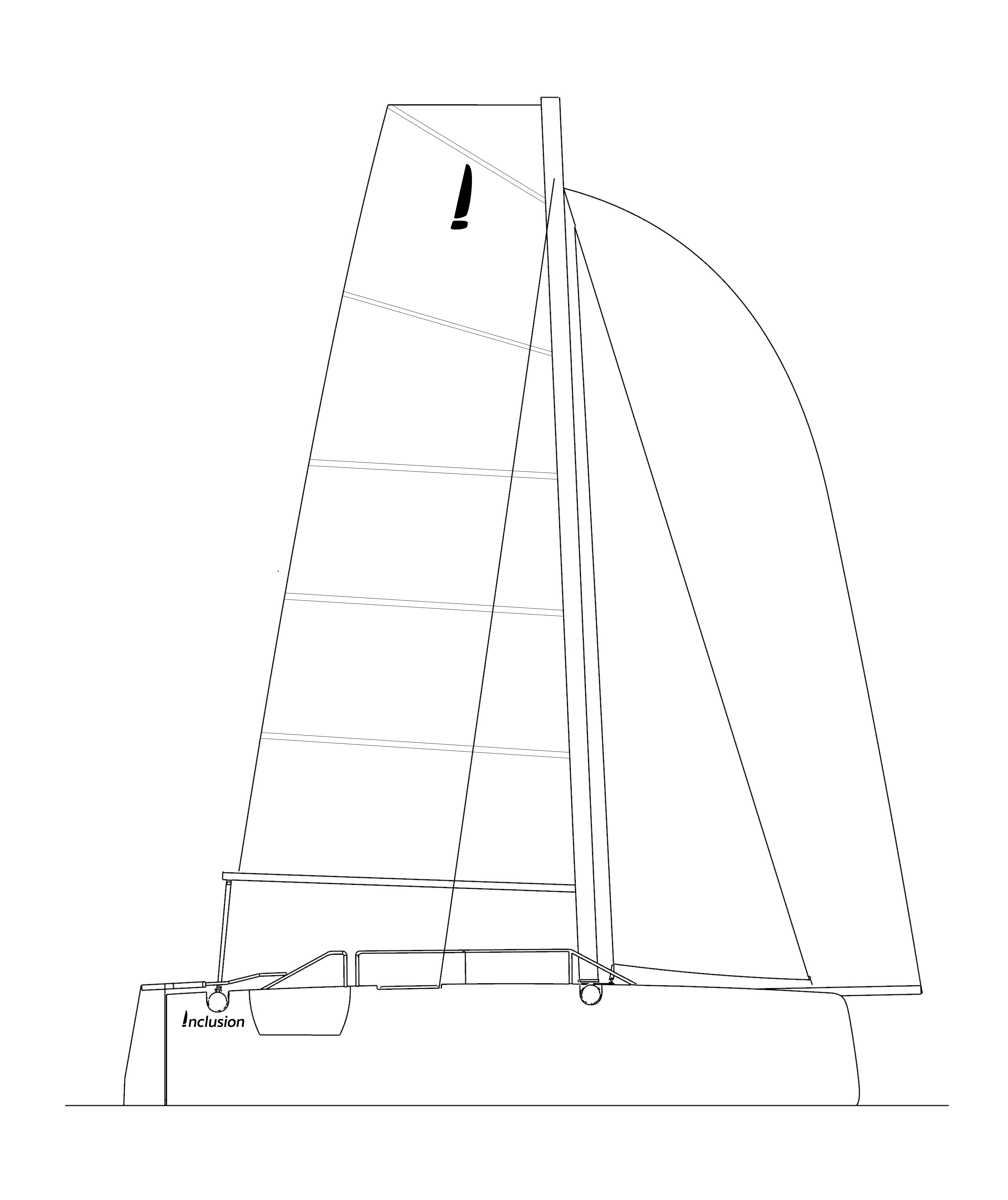

Development
- Designer: Frederico Cerveira
- Brand: Inclusive Sailing

Boat
- Crew: Max 10
- Displacement: 1,100 kg (2,400 lb) (lightweight)

Hull
- Type: catamaran
- LOA: 7.5 m (25 ft)
- LOH: 6.5 m (21 ft)
- Beam: 4.5 m (15 ft)

Rig
- Rig type: Bermuda rig
- Mast height: 8.6 m (28 ft)

Sails
- Mainsail area: 18 m^{2} (190 sq ft)
- Jib/genoa area: 6 m^{2} (65 sq ft)
- Gennaker area: 20 m^{2} (220 sq ft)

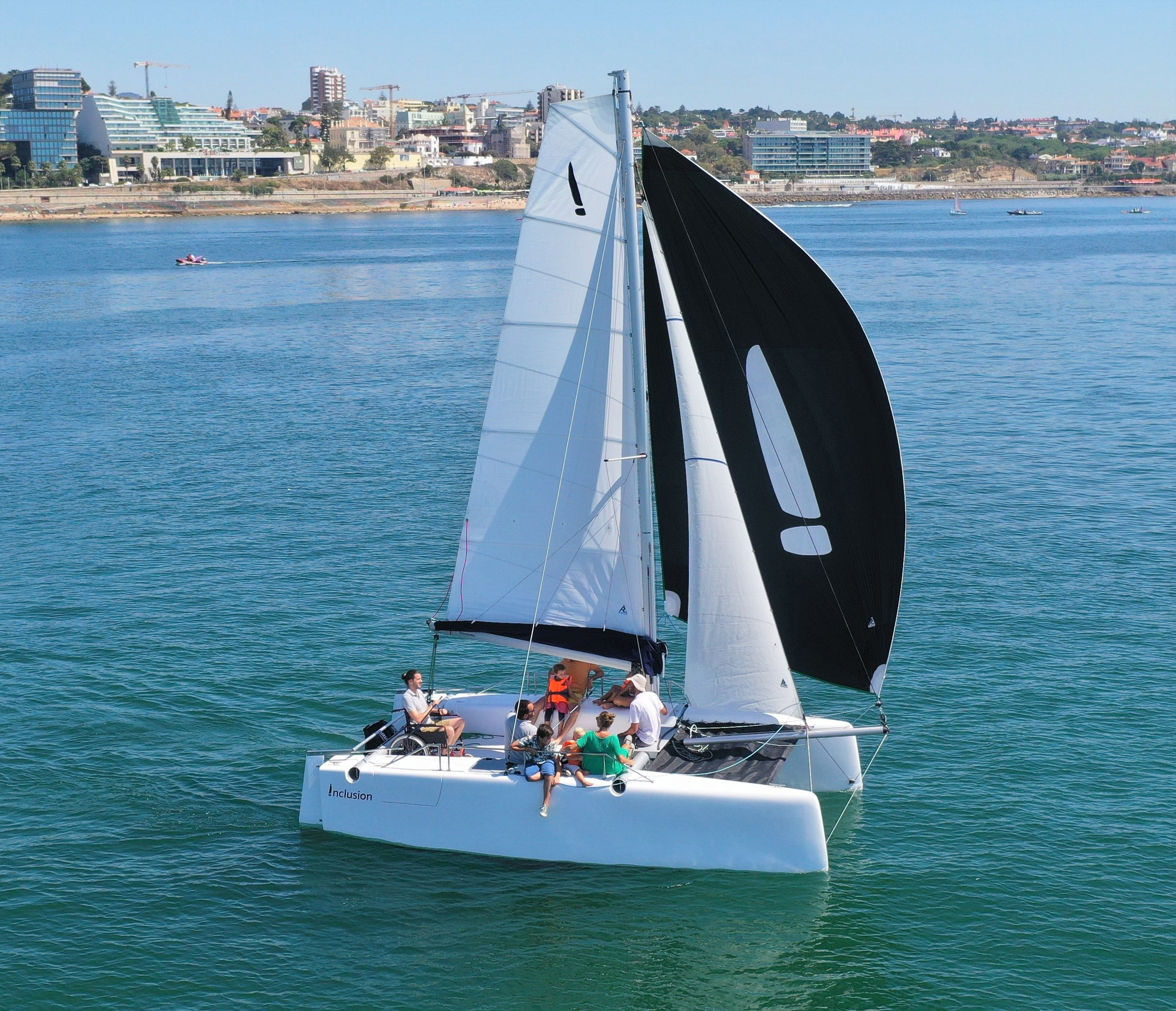
The boat sailing downwind with a wheelchair user at the helm.

The Inclusion Catamaran is a modern wheelchair-accessible sailing catamaran that was designed by naval engineer Frederico Cerveira, founder of Inclusive Sailing.

The catamaran was developed using principles of universal design. Universal design intends to develop products that can be accessible by everyone, regardless of factors such as age, disabilities and physical limitations.

== Design ==
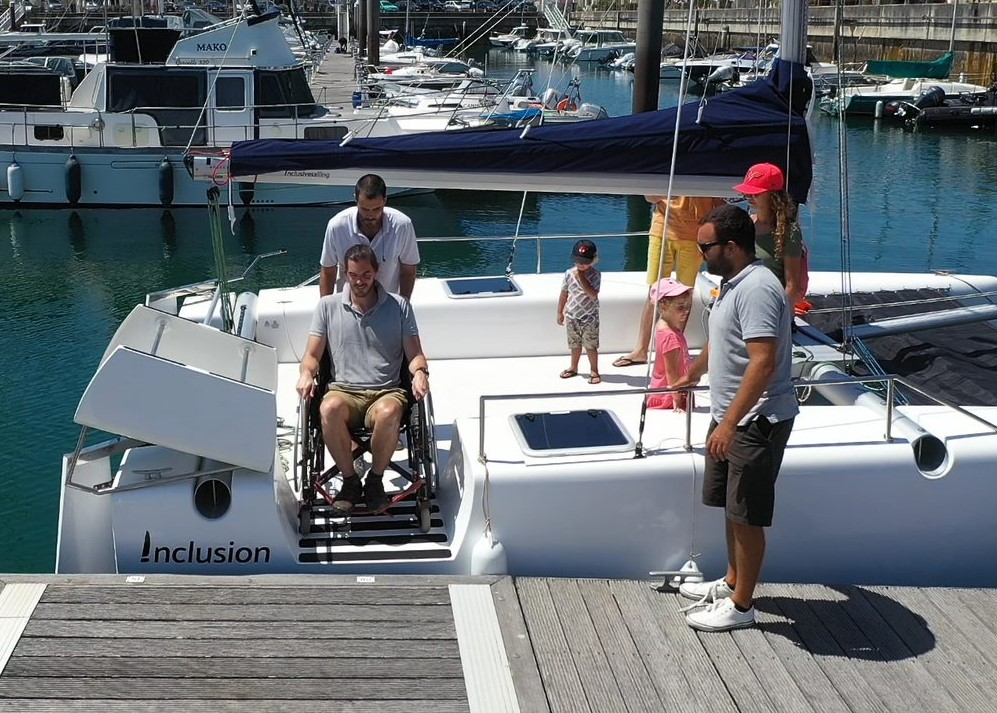
Detail of the accessible door system.

The Inclusion Catamaran has a length overall of 7,5 m, a 4,5 m beam and 0,8 m draft.

Regarding the rig, the boat has a Bermuda rig. The mainsail has an area of 18 m^{2}, the jib 6 m^{2} and the gennaker 20 m^{2}.

Its stable deck has a maximum crew capacity of 10 people, including 4 wheelchair users, and in each hull there is space for storage and beds.

== Adaptations for disabled people ==
The boat has specially designed doors that enable wheelchairs users to onboard without the need for cranes. It is also equipped with adaptive systems for the rudders and sails.
