= Alice M. Hammel =

American music educator, author, and clinician

Alice M. Hammel is an American music educator, author, and clinician known for her work in inclusive music education for students with disabilities. In 2023, she was named a Lowell Mason Fellow by the National Association for Music Education (NAfME).

== Early life and education ==
Hammel was born in Tampa, Florida, and went to K-12 schools in Sebring, Florida. She attended Shenandoah Conservatory in Winchester, Virginia, where she earned a Bachelor of Music Education, magna cum laude, in 1987. She later completed a Master of Music Education at Florida State University in 1989 and returned to Shenandoah to earn a Doctor of Musical Arts in 1999.

== Career ==
=== Teaching ===
Hammel has served on the faculties of James Madison University in Harrisonburg, Virginia, and has taught music theory and aural skills at Virginia Commonwealth University. She also lectured in music education for the University of Arkansas's Graduate Certificate in Music Education for Students with Special Needs and taught in Rutgers University's Mason Gross School of the Arts online programs. She teaches at VanderCook College of Music. She taught as a Musicianship teacher for Kodály Programs in the United States for almost 20 years.

Hammel has also worked as a music intervention specialist for ASSET (Autism Spectrum Support, Education and Training), a program of Virginia Youth and Family Services, a clinician for Conn-Selmer and the inclusion-focused mentoring organization United Sound, and Organization of American Kodály Educators – Member at Large 2017-2019, Editorial Board 2013-2019, Teacher Education Committee 2015-2019.

=== Writing ===
Hammel's work focuses on adapting general, instrumental, and choral music instruction for students with disabilities, autism, and other learning differences.

With Ryan M. Hourigan, Hammel co-authored Teaching Music to Students with Special Needs: A Label-Free Approach (2011), which introduced a six-domain framework for adapting music instruction based on cognition, communication, behavior, emotions, physical needs, and sensory needs. The book was revised in 2017 and retitled Teaching Music to Students with Differences and Disabilities for its third edition in 2024.

Hammel also authored Teaching Music to Students with Special Needs: A Practical Resource (2017) and, with Hourigan, Teaching Music to Students with Autism (2013; second edition 2020). In 2016, she co-authored Winding It Back: Teaching to Individual Differences in Music Classroom and Ensemble Settings with Roberta Hickox and Hourigan.

In 2024, Hammel published Universal Design for Learning in Music Education and Q&A for Band Directors on Students with Differences and Disabilities.

=== Leadership ===
Hammel chaired NAfME's first Task Force on Students with Special Needs and has served on the organization's National Executive Board, Equity Committee where she is now a Co-Chair, the NAfME President's Cabinet, Professional Learning Programming Committee, and Music Teacher Professional Initiative.

Previously, she served as president of the Council for Exceptional Children's Division for Visual and Performing Arts Education and the Virginia Music Educators Association (VMEA).

Hammel has also been affiliated with the John F. Kennedy Center for the Performing Arts for more than fifteen years through its National Forum on the intersection of arts education and special education. Hammel is a Past-President of the Council for Exceptional Children - Division for the Fine and Performing Arts Division (DARTS). She was awarded the Past President of DARTS.

== Awards and honors ==
- 2016: Shenandoah University Alumnae of Excellence Award
- 2017: Alice M. Hammel Inclusion in Music Education Award, James Madison University
- 2018: Virginia Music Educators Association Outstanding Music Educator of the Year
- 2023: National Association for Music Education Lowell Mason Fellow
- 2024: Music Educator Award nominee, presented by the Recording Academy and Grammy Museum
- 2024: Virginia Music Educators Association Award for Service
- 2025: Virginia Music Educators Association Lifetime Achievement Award
- 2025: Shenandoah University Lifetime Achievement Award
