= Universal design for instruction =

Universal instructional design (UID) or universal design for instruction (UDI) is an educational framework for applying universal design principles to learning environments with a goal toward greater accessibility for all students, including students with disabilities. UDI involves considering the potential needs of all learners when designing and delivering instruction by identifying and eliminating unnecessary barriers to teaching and learning while maintaining academic rigor. UDI is thus proactive and benefits all students, in contrast to providing accommodations for a specific student (e.g., providing a sign language interpreter for a student who is deaf).

== Background ==
Universal Design for Instruction (UDI) applies and adapts universal design principles and the Principles of Universal Design to learning environments and learning products, with a goal toward maximizing learning for all students.

Universal design (UD), a concept pioneered by architect Ronald Mace at North Carolina State University (NCSU), refers to buildings, products, and environments that are inherently accessible to both people without disabilities and people with disabilities. The Center for Universal Design at NCSU established a set of Principles of Universal Design based on UD to guide and evaluate the design process, with a goal toward creating more accessible products and environments. Universal Design for Instruction is an educational framework and set of strategies that applies both UD and the Principles of Universal Design to academic and teaching environments, learning products, and learning materials.

Specific UDI frameworks and educational initiatives vary between academic and policy institutions. The Center for Universal Design in Education (CUDE) at the DO-IT Center (University of Washington) combines UD, the Principles of Universal Design and Universal Design for Learning (UDL) to create UDI strategies for applying universal design to educational products and environments. Each CUDE strategy is linked with relevant principles of UD and UDL. Using a different approach, the Center on Postsecondary Education and Disability at the University of Connecticut developed a set of UDI principles that draws on the work of Chickering and Gamson, who had originally published a set of principles for more inclusive postsecondary education, as well as the Principles of Universal Design.

== Principles ==
The original seven Principles of Universal Design for products and environments established by the Center for Universal Design at NCSU follow; UDI applies these principles to learning environments.

- Principle 1: Equitable Use
- Principle 2: Flexibility in Use
- Principle 3: Simple and Intuitive
- Principle 4: Perceptible Information
- Principle 5: Tolerance for Error
- Principle 6: Low Physical Effort
- Principle 7: Size and Space for Approach and Use

The DO-IT Center's Center for Universal Design in Education (CUDE) combines UDI strategies and UD principles with the more specific Universal Design for Learning (UDL) framework. Universal Design for Learning (UDL) is "a set of principles for curriculum development that give all individuals equal opportunities to learn." UDL guidelines encourage curriculum designers to provide the student with options with respect to the following:

- UDI 1: Perception
- UDI 2: Language, Expressions, Symbolism
- UDI 3: Comprehension
- UDI 4: Physical Action
- UDI 5: Expressive Skills and Fluency
- UDI 6: Executive Functions
- UDI 7: Recruiting Interest
- UDI 8: Sustaining Effort and Persistence
- UDI 9: Self-Regulation

The University of Connecticut researchers and practitioners propose nine principles that describe a successful implementation of Universal Design for Instruction. Four of them state that materials and activities should be:

- 1: Accessible and fair,
- 2: Flexible,
- 3: Straightforward and consistent, and
- 4: Explicit.

Three principles for universal design for instruction state that the learning environment should:

- 5: Be supportive,
- 6: Minimize unnecessary physical effort, and
- 7: Accommodate students and multiple teaching methods.

Universal design for instruction includes two more principles related to the delivery environment:

- 8: Tolerance for error and
- 9: Size and space for approach and use.

== Examples of application to instruction ==
Ways of applying UD to instruction, developed through University of Washington Universal Design in Higher Education Initiative, include those listed below.

- Delivery Methods: Use of a variety of delivery methods and learning approaches, including lecture, discussion, hands-on activities, projects, cases, and Internet-based interaction. All should be accessible to students with a wide range of abilities, backgrounds, and previous experiences.
- Learning Methods and Materials: Print materials should be available in electronic format. Provide text descriptions of graphics presented on web pages. Use presentation tools to make presentations legible in large spaces. Use captioned video presentations. Provide outlines in advance to allow students to prepare for the topic to be presented. Create printed and web-based materials in simple, intuitive, and consistent formats.
- Interaction: Encourage different ways for students to interact with each other and with the facilitator. This may include in-class questions and discussion, group work, and Internet-based communications.
- Feedback: Provide effective prompting during an activity and feedback after the assignment is complete. Use feedback to help students correct errors and misconceptions. Allow opportunities for self-assessment. Ensure that electronic-based learning tools provide proper feedback for both navigation and learning and are designed in an accessible format.
- Assessment/Demonstration of Knowledge: Ensure that students' opportunity to demonstrate knowledge is frequent and if possible, flexible. Consider options besides tests and papers for demonstrating knowledge, such as group work, demonstrations, portfolios, and videotaped or on-site presentations.
- Physical Effort and Access: Ensure that classrooms, labs, and field work are accessible to individuals with a wide range of physical abilities. Make sure equipment and activities minimize sustained physical effort and accommodate people with different physical abilities. Ensure the safety of all students. Minimize the need for unnecessary physical travel by making materials available or allowing them to be submitted electronically.

== The process ==
The Center for Universal Design in Education (CUDE) at the DO-IT Center at the University of Washington describes Universal Design of Instruction (UDI) as "a goal, a process, and a set of practices." According to CUDE, the UDI process is described as the following series of steps:

1. Identify the course. Describe the course, its learning objectives, and its overall content.
2. Define the universe. Describe the overall population of students eligible to enroll in the course and then consider their potential diverse characteristics (e.g., with respect to gender; age; ethnicity and race; native language; learning style; and abilities to see, hear, manipulate objects, read, and communicate).
3. Involve students. Consider perspectives of students with diverse characteristics, as identified in Step 2, in the development of the course. If they are not available directly from students, gain student perspectives through diversity programs such as the campus disability services office.
4. Adopt instructional strategies. Adopt overall learning and teaching philosophies and methods. Integrate these practices with universal design guidelines or strategies for learning or instruction.
5. Apply instructional strategies. Apply universal design strategies in concert with good instructional practices (both identified in Step 4) to the overall choice of course teaching methods, curricula, and assessments. Then apply universal design to all lectures, classroom discussions, group work, handouts, web-based content, labs, fieldwork, assessment instruments, and other academic activities and materials to maximize the learning of students with the wide variety of characteristics identified in Step 2.
6. Plan for accommodations. Learn campus procedures for addressing accommodation requests (e.g., arrangement of sign language interpreters) from specific students for whom the course design does not automatically provide full access.
7. Evaluate. Monitor the effectiveness of instruction through observation and feedback from students with the diverse set of characteristics identified in Step 2, assess learning, and modify the course as appropriate.
