= Selwyn Goldsmith =

English architect, town planner and disabilities advocate (1932–2011)

Selwyn Goldsmith (11 December 1932 – 3 April 2011) was an architect, town planner, writer and disabilities advocate who was instrumental in the development of the universal approach to design. He wrote numerous books which became standard texts for designers and architects.

== Biography ==
Goldsmith was born in Newark, Nottinghamshire on 11 December 1932. He was educated at Abbotsholme school, Staffordshire, and read architecture at Trinity Hall, Cambridge, completing his qualification at the Bartlett School, University College London, in 1956. He contracted polio in that same year and was paralysed down the right hand side of his body for the rest of his life.

== Research ==
=== Dropped kerb ===
While working in Norwich in 1967, he interviewed wheelchair users, research that led to the concept of the idea of the dropped kerb. 15 of these being installed in the city. After this development Goldsmith realised the impact this can have on all users, such as mothers with pushchairs. This led to his interest in Universal principles of design.

=== Universal design ===
Goldsmith worked with Gordon Ricketts, the secretary of the Royal Institute of British Architects. Together they developed the idea behind Designing for the Disabled which was a new concept within the UK. This resulted in the book Designing for the Disabled (1963), which is an architectural planning manual on access for disabled people to facilities and buildings. He later revised this book after retirement. In his later life he further developed the idea of Universal Design in a book of the same title. This work considered that having "different" or "extreme" needs is not unusual, but in fact "normal". That urban design, architecture and digital content should be design for all as a standard and not be considering a certain group as special.

The architect who takes the bottom-up route to universal design works on the premise that the building users he or she is serving, including those with disabilities, are all people who can be treated as normal people. The architect does not start with the presumption that people with disabilities are abnormal, are peculiar and different, and that, in order to make buildings accessible to them, they should be packaged together and then, with a set of special-for-the-disabled accessibility standards, have their requirements presented in topdown mode as add-ons to unspecified normal provision.

=== Ps and queues ===
Goldsmith worked with his wife, Becky Goldsmith, on the issue of inequality in toilet facilities in major buildings from 1989. Their research highlighted the issue of the poor level of toilets for women over that of men. This led to numerous articles and reports for the UK Department of the Environment. He called a subsequent article on the subject "Ps and Queues".

=== The Selwyn Goldsmith Award ===
Since 2011 The Civic Trust has been awarding buildings and interior designs which allow all to use with dignity and equality.
