= CEN/CENELEC Guide 6 =

Document for participants in standardisation activities

CEN/CENELEC Guide 6: Guidelines for standards developers to address the needs of older persons and persons with disabilities is a document for participants in standardisation activities at CEN and CENELEC that contains guidance for the creation and the revision of standards to ensure greater accessibility of products and services. The document is a "Guide", in other words, not a European Standard (EN). The guide is identical to ISO/IEC Guide 71 and was adopted by both the CEN Technical Board and the CENELEC Technical Board, and published in January 2002. The adoption of CEN/CENELEC Guide 6 resulted from a European mandate to the European standardisation organisations, and the European Commission is funding projects to promote the use of the Guide.

A revised version was published in December 2014; it is identical to ISO/IEC Guide 71:2014.

== Background ==
In 2000 ISO and IEC published the policy statement: "Addressing the needs of older persons and people with disabilities in standardization work". This policy statement recognised the need to include the requirements of older persons and persons with disabilities during the development and revision of standards. The document stated that this could be achieved by following the basic principles of:

- Universal or Accessible Design
- consumer representation of older persons and people with disabilities; and
- relevant information exchange.

The policy statement also recommended using ISO/IEC Guide 71, which would become available in 2001. ISO/IEC Guide 71:2001: Guidelines for standardization to address the needs of older persons and people with disabilities was published in 2001 and has been widely accepted: it has been used in Japan and was adopted by CEN and CENELEC as CEN/CENELEC Guide 6 (see below). ISO/IEC Guide 71 was also made available in Braille and was the first ISO publication that was made available in this format.

CEN and CENELEC adopted ISO/IEC Guide 71 as CEN/CENELEC Guide 6 as a result of Mandate M/283, which the European Commission gave to the three official European standardisation bodies, CEN, CENELEC and ETSI on 24 June 1999. The text of the mandate pointed out that special needs were addressed in standards related to assistive technology, but that

there is no formal structure or procedure ensuring that the needs of all consumers of all ages, with or without disabilities or special abilities, are catered for in the entire standardisation process. Individual standardisation committees do not spontaneously take into account safety and usability for people with disabilities and for elderly people, except if they draft specific standards for assistive products. If general standards for consumer products do not meet the requirements of these consumers with special needs, this means that many products and services cannot be used by a large part of the European population.

Guide 6 is part of a wider framework that standardisation organisations can use to support the need for more accessible products and services. The ISO/IEC Policy Statement 2000 "Addressing the Needs of Older Persons and People with Disabilities in Standardization Work" already provided principles and considerations for ensuring that the needs of older persons and persons with disabilities are addressed in the standardisation process.

ETSI, the third European standardisation body to which Mandate M/283 was addressed, did not adopt CEN/CENELEC Guide 6 but continued using ISO/IEC Guide 71 as a reference document. Since 2008 ISO/IEC Guide 71 has a supporting document: ISO/TR 22411:2008: Ergonomics data and guidelines for the application of ISO/IEC Guide 71 to products and services to address the needs of older persons and persons with disabilities.

In December 2014 CEN and CENELEC adopted the revised ISO/IEC Guide 71: 2014 as CEN-CENELEC Guide 6:2014. This new version of Guide 6 is freely available on the website of CEN and CENELEC.

== Content ==
CEN/CENELEC Guide 6 is a document for participants in CEN technical bodies: Technical Committees or TCs, Working Groups or WGs, Task Forces, Workshops etcetera. These technical bodies are responsible for addressing the needs of persons with disabilities and older people in the standards, specifications, reports or other documents that they produce.

CEN/CENELEC Guide 6 has three goals:

1. to inform how human abilities (and disabilities) affect the usability of products, services and the built environment,
2. to describe how requirements in standards relate to accessibility and usability of products and services,
3. to raise awareness about the benefits of accessible design.

The Guide consists of a few introductory sections followed by 10 other chapters which are called "clauses". The most important chapters are described in the list below.

1. Clause 6 briefly describes a process that allows technical committees to consider the needs of older persons and persons with disabilities. It divides the standardisation process into five steps; for each step, the Guide lists one or more issues that need to be addressed.
2. Clause 7 and 8 provide tables that relate several types of clauses in a standard (for example, on packaging, the user interface and the built environment) to factors that need to be considered when addressing disabilities.
3. Clause 9 provides descriptions of body functions or disabilities and their implications when using products and services.
4. The last chapter is a bibliography that provides a list of resources for more specific guidance.

== Implementation and uptake ==
In December 2001, CEN and CENELEC published CEN/CENELEC Guide 2: "CEN/CENELEC Guide 2: Consumer interests and the preparation of standards", which is a republication of CEN/CENELEC Memorandum 2 from 1977. This guide recommends member bodies of CEN and CENELEC to consult with consumer organisations when developing standards that are relevant to consumer interests. CEN/CENELEC Guide 2 is older than Guide 6 and therefore does not reference it.

At the end of 2004, CEN adopted a "Mechanism on the use of the CEN/CENELEC Guide 6" According to ANEC it took two years to develop this mechanism and its adoption followed after "intense lobbying by ANEC". The implementation mechanism has several implications:

1. CEN technical bodies (such as Technical Committees and Working Groups) are responsible for addressing the needs of older persons and of persons with disabilities in their standards. They can do this by creating an optional working document that is not part of the standard. (Not every standard is affected by the mechanism.)
2. When a standard is reviewed, the technical body can address the needs of older persons and persons with disabilities if necessary. When creating a new standard, these needs can be addressed during the standardisation work.
3. When appropriate, a technical body can add a statement in the foreword of a standard that states where the needs of older persons and persons with disabilities have been addressed.
4. The primary reference document that technical bodies should use when addressing the needs of older persons and persons with disabilities in their work is CEN/CENELEC Guide 6.

CEN/CENELEC Guide 11: "Product information relevant to consumers - Guidelines for standard developers" was published in 2006 and refers to CEN/CENELEC Guide 6 for guidance on informational needs of people with disabilities and older people.

In 2006 CEN sent a questionnaire on the use of Guide 6 to its technical committees. The results showed that 3 out of 275 CEN committees used the Guide 6. ANEC decided to propose to CEN how to take an initiative to change the situation. In 2007–2008, NEN - the Dutch standardisation organisation - and Standard Norge carried out a feasibility study within the European Mandate M/371. One of the findings was that the implementation of Guide 6 faced some difficulties. For this reason, NEN and CEN started an action to promote the use of Guide 6, and in December 2007 NEN proposed the installation of an CEN/CENELEC/BT/WG Accessibility for All. ANEC also supported the creation of such a working group. This led to the creation of the CEN/CENELEC/BT/WG CEN/CENELEC Guide 6 Implementation Mechanism. The working group held a preliminary meeting on 29 October 2008 and its first official meeting on 8 April 2009.

In August 2008, the European Commission published a call for tenders on the subject of "Training of Stakeholders on consultations on standardisation" The main goal of this call is promoting the use of Guide 6:

A guide for standardisers to address the needs of older persons and persons with disabilities (CEN/CENELEC Guide 6), has been developed and is available since 2003 but its use is not widespread. The use of Guide 6 in a more systematic way can certainly help to address the needs of people with disabilities and older persons from a "design for all" perspective.

The use of the guide should be promoted by training two types of stakeholders in the standardisation process:

1. the traditional stakeholders in the standardisation process need training on accessibility matters and the use of Guide 6;
2. representatives of older persons and persons with disabilities need training on the standardisation process (and CEN/CENELEC Guide 6).

The European project USEM (User Empowerment in Standardisation) also used CEN/CENELEC Guide 6 in its training on standardisation for representatives of older persons and persons with disabilities.

== Translations ==
CEN/CENELEC Guide 6 is also available in other languages, usually as a translation of ISO/IEC Guide 71, for example:

- Dutch: NPR-ISO/IEC Guide 71:2002 nl: Richtlijnen voor normontwikkelaars voor de aanpak van de behoeftes van oudere personen en personen met een handicap,
- French: FD ISO/CEI GUIDE 71 Août 2002: Principes directeurs pour les normalisateurs afin de répondre aux besoins des personnes âgées et de celles ayant des incapacités,
- German: DIN-Fachbericht 131: Leitlinien für Normungsgremien zur Berücksichtigung der Bedürfnisse von älteren Menschen und von Menschen mit Behinderungen; Deutsche und englische Fassung des CEN/CENELEC-Leitfadens 6,
- Norwegian: SN-ISO/IEC Guide 71:2001: Retningslinjer for å ta hensyn til eldres og funksjonshemmedes behov ved utarbeidelse av standarder,
- Swedish: Riktlinjer för att i standardiseringsarbetet tillgodose behoven hos äldre och personer med funktionsnedsättningar,
- Japanese: JIS Z 8071:2003.

== See also ==
- Accessibility
- Universal Design
- Design for All (design philosophy)
- Design for All (in ICT)
- Assistive technology
- Computer accessibility
- Standardization
