= Gordon Ricketts =

Gordon Randolph Holmes Ricketts (1918 – 5 January 1968) was a British administrator. He was secretary of the Royal Institute of British Architects (RIBA), a role that is now chief executive.

== Life ==
Ricketts came from a military family and grew up in Kent. He was educated at St Lawrence College, Ramsgate, and Keble College, Oxford, he gained an honours degree in English language and literature. Later, he served in the RAF from 1940 to 1946. Between 1948 and 1951 he was on the staff of the Federation of British Industries, and from 1951 to 1957 he was appointments secretary at Nottingham University, where he also lectured and tutored.

Ricketts started at the RIBA in 1957 in the role of secretary for professional relations. After secretary C. D. Spragg retired, Ricketts succeeded him as acting secretary from March 1959. Ricketts was secretary from August 1959 until his sudden death in 1968 at St Margaret's Bay, Kent, aged 49. During his time as secretary, there was great change and conflict in the architectural profession, and he oversaw the major administrative reform of the RIBA to respond to it. He worked closely with the presidents of the RIBA, a post that has a two-year term, notably Robert Matthew and Basil Spence.

Ricketts also played a part in developing the idea for author Selwyn Goldsmith’s book ‘Designing for the Disabled’ published in 1963. The book was the first to provide guidance for designing for disabled people in buildings.

In the RIBA’s headquarters, 66 Portland Place, Rickett's name and date of his tenure (1959–1968) are chiselled into a wall with a list of secretaries of the RIBA.

== Family and legacy ==
At the time of his death, he had a wife and three children. Since 1968 in memory of Ricketts, every two years the RIBA Gordon Ricketts Fund awards a grant to support personal research projects related to architecture and the RIBA’s architectural collections. The most recent funding was awarded in 2018 and the next will be in 2020.
