= WordQ+SpeakQ =

Assistive technology software

WordQ
- Developer: Quillsoft Ltd.
- Stable release: 5.0 / October 17, 2018; 7 years ago
- Operating system: Microsoft Windows, Mac OS X
- Type: word prediction, speech recognition, assistive technology
- License: Proprietary
- Website: www.quillsoft.ca

WordQ® is an assistive technology software developed by Quillsoft Ltd. and Holland Bloorview Kids Rehabilitation Hospital. WordQ's main purpose is helping individuals who struggle with reading and writing. Often that struggle is due to physical disability or neurodivergence such as Dyslexia or ADHD. WordQ uses intelligent word prediction to suggest words that the user is typing in as few as 1.3 keystrokes. This helps with spelling, and reduces the amount of physical movements a user has to make when typing. It also uses high-quality Acapela text-to-speech voices to read back text that the user has entered, allowing for proofreading and editing. WordQs speech recognition feature, SpeakQ®, is included in WordQ Desktop for Windows OS. It allows users to switch between speaking and typing while writing. WordQ Desktop is available for Windows and Mac OS, iWordQ is available for iPadOS, and WordQ Chrome for the Chrome browser is slated for release in January 2022.

== Development ==
WordQ was first developed in the late 1990s by a research team led by Dr. Fraser Shein at the Holland Bloorview Kids Rehabilitation Hospital Toronto, Ontario, Canada. Shein and the hospital established a co-owned company, called Quillsoft Ltd, to commercialize WordQ and support further research at the hospital. WordQ's development followed previous software products also developed at Holland Bloorview, KeyREP® and WiVox®, which were tools to assist students who had physical writing difficulties. WordQ's application and functionality was expanded to help those who struggled in writing as a result of learning disabilities and put to use in larger context in Ontario schools. Its use then widely expanded in schools in Canada and elsewhere around the world after further development, as the team added features and included SpeakQ and ThoughtQ®. SpeakQ technology was developed in collaboration with the Education Development Center (Newton, MA) with support from the US Department of Education. Today, WordQ is used by a broad population of students, not just those with learning difficulties, e.g., second-language learners and average students and workers.

== Features ==
WordQ has a small interface window that appears on top of whatever window is being run and functions with any application where the user types. As an assistive technology, this is called transparent accessibility. As the user types in letters, the software attempts to suggest the word being used, based upon the first letters and words previously written by the user. As they are writing, the user may use the directional keys or the number keys to select the desired word. The user may also have the program read their typed speech aloud to them as they write, allowing for spelling and grammar changes to be caught while writing. The program can be turned on and off by the user as they write, and it works with all commonly used programs. WordQ currently can be used in English, French, Spanish & German.

== SpeakQ ==
A companion program, SpeakQ, adds speech recognition capability to WordQ. SpeakQ uses Windows Speech Recognition to allow the user to dictate into a microphone and have the text appear in the word processor. The user can switch between typing and speaking at will, and the program will suggest words that are hard to pronounce or spell. The user may also train the software to recognize more of their voice, although no initial training is necessary. Like WordQ, SpeakQ may be used with additional languages. SpeakQ has several unique functions: a simple training interface where training words are spoken aloud; speech feedback of recognized words; speech-enabled word prediction; and no verbal commands to learn. SpeakQ was specifically designed to make it easier for people who struggle with the mechanics of writing to express their ideas.

== Usage ==
WordQ is used in many schools throughout the US and Canada. The software has been marketed in Canada for several years, but is only beginning to emerge on the US market. In Canada, many schools have adopted it for use throughout their systems. In 2010, OSAPAC, the organization responsible for buying software for schools in Ontario, bought a license to use WordQ in all the schools in the entire province. The software has been primarily used as a tool for struggling writers and those with learning disabilities which hurts their ability to write. Third-party research suggests that WordQ does as well, if not better, than other similar software at helping these struggling writers. Another independent research study suggests that WordQ's word prediction and text-to-speech capabilities could have a positive impact on the writing skills of elementary school students with specific learning disabilities.

== Reviews ==
PC Magazine reviewed this software in early 2011, giving it four stars out of five, and calling it "one of the simplest, most useful, and least expensive options" for helping with the mechanical processes of writing. The review found that WordQ was most useful for students and struggling writers.
