= Least frequently used =

Algorithm for caching data

Least Frequently Used (LFU) is a type of cache replacement policy used to manage memory within a computer. The standard characteristics of this method involve the system keeping track of the number of times a block is referenced in memory. When the cache is full and requires more room the system will purge the item with the lowest reference frequency.

LFU is sometimes combined with a Least Recently Used algorithm and called LRFU.

== Implementation ==
The simplest method to employ an LFU algorithm is to assign a counter to every block that is loaded into the cache. Each time a reference is made to that block the counter is increased by one. When the cache reaches capacity and has a new block waiting to be inserted the system will search for the block with the lowest counter and remove it from the cache, in case of a tie (i.e., two or more keys with the same frequency), the least recently used key would be invalidated.

- Ideal LFU: there is a counter for each item in the catalogue
- Practical LFU: there is a counter for the items stored in cache. The counter is forgotten if the item is evicted.

== Problems ==
While the LFU method may seem like an intuitive approach to memory management it is not without faults. Consider an item in memory which is referenced repeatedly for a short period of time and is not accessed again for an extended period of time. Due to how rapidly it was just accessed its counter has increased drastically even though it will not be used again for a decent amount of time. This leaves other blocks which may actually be used more frequently susceptible to purging simply because they were accessed through a different method.

Moreover, new items that just entered the cache are subject to being removed very soon again, because they start with a low counter, even though they might be used very frequently after that. Due to major issues like these, an explicit LFU system is fairly uncommon; instead, there are hybrids that utilize LFU concepts.

== See also ==
- Cache replacement policies
- Memory paging
- Page replacement algorithm § Not frequently used (NFU)
