= Qwerty effect =

Proposed association between keyboard position and the emotional meanings of words

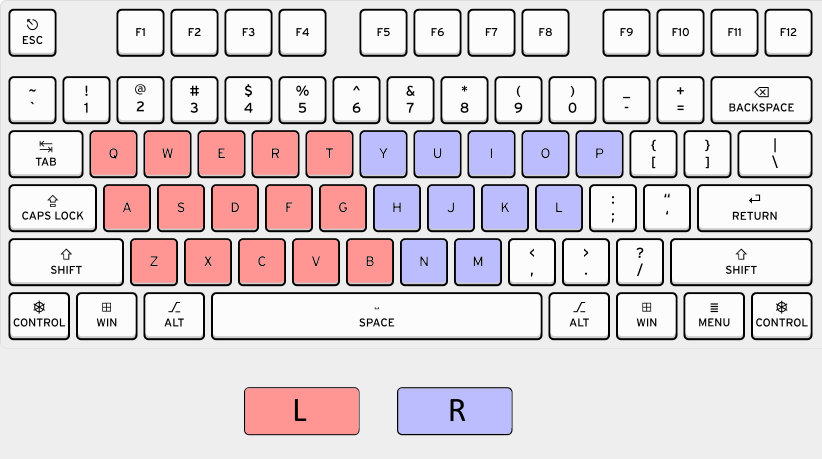
Keyboard division commonly used when studying the QWERTY effect. The right-side letters are Y, U, I, O, P, H, J, K, L, N, and M; the remaining letter keys are classified as left-side letters.

The QWERTY effect is a proposed psycholinguistic phenomenon in which the location of letters on a QWERTY keyboard is statistically associated with the perceived emotional meaning, or valence, of the words containing those letters. In its original formulation, words containing relatively more letters typed on the right side of the keyboard tended to receive slightly more positive ratings than words containing relatively more left-side letters.

The effect has been studied using word-rating experiments, invented words, personal names, online reviews and consumer ratings. Although several studies have reported evidence supporting it, other analyses have found little or no effect. The QWERTY effect is therefore generally treated as a small and disputed statistical tendency rather than proof that keyboards directly determine the meanings of words.

== Measurement ==
Most studies divide the alphabet according to the side of a standard QWERTY keyboard on which each key appears. The left-side letters are:

Q, W, E, R, T, A, S, D, F, G, Z, X, C, V and B.

The right-side letters are:

Y, U, I, O, P, H, J, K, L, N and M.

A commonly used measurement is the right-side advantage, calculated by subtracting the number of left-side letters in a word from the number of right-side letters:

$$RSA = R - L$$

For example, the word milk contains four right-side letters and therefore has a right-side advantage of +4. The word tree contains four left-side letters and has a score of −4. These scores only describe the positions of the letters and do not, by themselves, demonstrate that one word is perceived more positively than another.

Other researchers have used the proportion of a word's letters found on the right side of the keyboard:

$$RSR = \frac{R}{R+L}$$

This measurement, sometimes called the right-side ratio, accounts for differences in word length.

== Proposed explanations ==
Researchers have connected the QWERTY effect to embodied cognition, the theory that physical experiences can influence abstract thought. Typing a word is a physical action, and repeated experiences with that action could become associated with how the word is evaluated.

One proposed explanation is processing fluency. Actions that are easier or more comfortable to perform are sometimes evaluated more positively than actions that require greater effort. According to this explanation, differences in the ease, speed or familiarity of typing particular letter combinations could influence judgments of the resulting words.

Another explanation involves learned associations between physical space and emotional value. Because most people are right-handed, researchers initially considered whether the right side might have stronger positive associations for right-handed typists. However, later experiments found similar right-side preferences among right-handed and left-handed participants, making a simple dominant-hand explanation insufficient.

The exact mechanism remains uncertain. Keyboard position, typing experience, letter frequency, word length and the combinations of fingers used to type a word may all contribute to the reported associations.

== Research ==
=== Initial word-valence experiments ===
The term was introduced by researchers Kyle Jasmin and Daniel Casasanto in a 2012 study. They examined emotional-valence ratings for words in English, Spanish and Dutch. Across the combined datasets, words with a greater right-side advantage tended to receive more positive ratings. The relationship was statistically significant in the English and Dutch datasets, while the Spanish results followed the same general direction but were not independently significant.

The researchers also examined English words that entered common use after the development and widespread adoption of QWERTY typing. They reported that the association between keyboard side and emotional valence was stronger among these newer words than among older words. This was interpreted as possible evidence that typing experience could influence how words develop or are selected, although the analysis was correlational and could not establish causation.

In another experiment, approximately 800 English-speaking participants rated invented letter sequences that followed English spelling patterns. Because the items were not existing words with established dictionary meanings, the experiment was intended to reduce the influence of previously learned definitions. Participants gave slightly more positive ratings to invented words containing more right-side letters.

=== Later studies ===
A 2014 series of experiments reported similar associations in larger English-language datasets and in German words typed using the closely related QWERTZ layout. An analysis of Portuguese words produced a smaller result that became marginal after controls were added, although the combined evidence across the languages examined was statistically significant.

The same researchers asked participants to rate individual letters rather than complete words. Letters located farther to the right of the keyboard received somewhat more positive ratings. This pattern appeared among both right-handed and left-handed participants.

A 2022 study by Erin Buchanan, K. D. Valentine and Addie Wilkowsky reported a replication of the association in an additional word-valence dataset. The researchers also found that typing expertise and a word's typeability—including how efficiently its letters could be entered and whether typing alternated between hands—helped predict participants' ratings. Their results suggested that the effect may involve the overall physical fluency of typing rather than keyboard side alone.

=== Online ratings and writing ===
David Garcia and Markus Strohmaier tested the QWERTY effect using 15 online datasets. Their study distinguished between two possible forms of the effect:

- Decoding occurs when the keyboard composition of a name or title is associated with how positively people evaluate it.
- Encoding occurs when people's positive or negative evaluations are associated with the keyboard composition of the language they produce.

For decoding, the researchers compared the names or titles of products, businesses, films, books and online videos with user ratings. Evidence consistent with the effect appeared in eight of the eleven decoding datasets. For encoding, they examined the language used in written reviews and found significant associations in three of four datasets. However, the results differed between websites and types of content, and the reported effects were generally small.

Because these were observational datasets, the results could not show that keyboard position caused customers to give particular ratings. Product quality, word choice, language, popularity and other characteristics may have influenced both the names being studied and the ratings they received.

=== Personal names ===
Research on personal names has produced conflicting results. Casasanto and colleagues analyzed United States Social Security Administration baby-name records from 1960 through 2012. They reported that the average right-side advantage of names increased over time and that names first appearing in the data after 1990 tended to contain more right-side letters than established names. The researchers proposed that the spread of routine computer typing may have influenced name preferences.

A separate study by Wayne E. Thogmartin examined the popularity of the 1,000 most common male and female names at ten-year intervals between 1880 and 2010. That analysis found no meaningful relationship between a name's right-side advantage and its popularity. Thogmartin concluded that the original QWERTY effect did not reliably extend to birth-name choices.

The difference between these conclusions may partly result from the studies' different time periods, inclusion rules and measurements. Neither analysis demonstrates that keyboard use directly caused parents to select particular names.

=== Japanese input ===
The effect may be more difficult to define in languages that do not enter words directly through alphabetic keystrokes. Japanese computer users commonly type phonetic spellings using the Latin alphabet and then use an input method editor to convert them into kana or kanji. Consequently, the final written characters do not have a simple one-to-one relationship with the keys that were pressed.

A 2022 study initially found no QWERTY effect in a Japanese word-valence dataset. Combining it with three additional datasets produced a small overall association, but the researcher concluded that the effect was too weak and statistically uncertain to be considered reliable evidence in Japanese.

== Limitations and criticism ==
Reported QWERTY effects are usually small and can depend on the dataset, language, statistical controls and method used to divide or count letters. Word length and letter frequency are especially important possible confounding variables because common letters are not distributed evenly across the keyboard.

Much of the evidence comes from correlations between spelling and ratings. Words are not randomly assigned their letters, and researchers cannot easily separate keyboard position from pronunciation, spelling patterns, word origins, cultural associations and existing meanings. Experimental results using invented words reduce some of these concerns but do not necessarily show that the same process shapes established vocabulary.

The theory also assumes experience with a QWERTY-style keyboard. Its predictions may not transfer directly to other layouts such as Dvorak or AZERTY, to users who type with one hand, or to touchscreen typing in which both thumbs can reach letters on either side. Research involving Chinese and Japanese input methods creates additional difficulties because the letters typed may be converted into entirely different written characters.

For these reasons, the QWERTY effect does not imply that words composed of right-side letters are inherently positive or that changing a keyboard layout would automatically change a language. It describes a proposed statistical relationship whose size, causes and generalizability remain subjects of research.

== Related terminology ==
The Wubi Effect was the title of a 2020 episode of the radio program Radiolab about the history of computerized Chinese writing. The episode discussed the shape-based Wubi method, the later popularity of phonetic pinyin input and the increasing use of predictive suggestions and cloud-based input systems. It subsequently discussed the QWERTY effect as a separate example of how writing technology might interact with language.

The phrase Wubi effect is therefore not generally used in academic research as another name for the QWERTY effect. Wubi, autocomplete and search-engine suggestions may influence writing through different mechanisms, such as limiting the choices immediately presented to a user, but those processes are distinct from the proposed association between keyboard side and emotional valence.

== See also ==
- Embodied cognition
- Human–computer interaction
- Input method editor
- Keyboard layout
- Linguistic relativity
- Processing fluency
- Psycholinguistics
