= Northeast Asia Standards Cooperation Forum =

International standards organization

The Northeast Asia Standards Cooperation Forum (NEAS Forum) is a platform for standards organizations from China, Japan, and South Korea to exchange information, propose joint standards, harmonize standards, and promote policy coordination. They have helped establish 29 international standards.

It includes national government standardization bodies like

- National Standardization Administration of China (SAC),
- Japanese Industrial Standards Committee (JISC), and
- Korean Agency for Technology and Standards (KATS);

and standards association secretariats like

- China Association for Standardization (CAS),
- Japanese Standards Association (JSA), and
- Korean Standards Association (KSA).

== Forums ==
Date	N	Location	Notes
/2002-10-29	1	South Korea	Establishing working-level consultations for ISO/IEC-related project cooperation and intellectual property rights research cooperation, regularization of forum to prepare for the Northeast Asia Standardization Dialogue, regional project research, development of educational programs.
/2003-10-31	2	China	Agreement to publish the Standardization Glossary in English, Korean, Japanese, and Chinese; intellectual property rights issues exchange; co-operating on public signage pictograms, signs for the elderly and disabled, etc.; personnel training programs implementation.
/2004-12-14	3	Japan	ISO NWI-proposal for public signage pictograms; progress management charts for cooperation projects quarterly presentations; future cooperation agendas; co-operation promotion for insurance and medical information systems, energy loss management and electrical steel sheet analysis, lightning protection systems and terminology, and water supply and sewage treatment.
/2005-11-25	4	South Korea	T-pallet for international trade; to establish Asia Pallet System Federation; agreement on Joint Submission of Standardization Proposal for elderly and disabled, energy loss management, and international electrical steel sheets; agreement on cooperation on pictograms.
/2006-11-14	5	China	Discussion of ISO/TC 71 concrete, reinforced concrete, prestressed concrete; ISO/TC 206 fine ceramics; ISO/TC 38 textile care labels using symbols; and assistive products for the elderly and disabled
/2007-11-14	6	Japan	Strengthening cooperation in ISO/TC 162 doors and windows, ISO/TC 171 document management, and test methods for fibrous activated carbon.
/2008-11-07	7	South Korea	Completion of cooperation in ISO/TC 38 textile care labels using symbols, and ISO/TC 206 fine ceramics; future cooperation in antimicrobial effects of antifungal agents, and measurement methods for LED backlights.
/2009-11-18	8	China	To establish working groups energy efficiency, welfare, and logistics; completion of antifungals projects; future cooperation on basic emission limits for adhesives' volatile organic compounds, guidelines on quality and safety technologies for consumer products, ISO/TC 164 mechanical testing methods for metals info exchange, products for the elderly, eco-friendly textiles.
2010-07-20/21	9	Japan, Toyama	112 participants. Discuss future possible framework to implement the 2010-05-29 Joint Statement on Standards Cooperation; agree to hold the Korea-China-Japan Information and Electronics International Standardization Cooperation (CJK-SITE) plenary session concurrently from the next forum; completed projects: ISO/TC 71 concrete, reinforced concrete, prestressed concrete, corporate social responsibility, education, eco-friendly textiles; future projects: smart grids including joint proposals to the IEC, wastewater treatment, utilization of regenerated urban wastewater.
2011-06-22/24	10	South Korea, Busan	123 delegates. Completed projects: consumer goods quality and safety technologies, basic emission limits for volatile organic compounds in adhesives, auxiliary devices, ISO/TC 162 doors and windows, testing method for the thermal conductivity of electronic circuit boards for high-brightness LEDs. Future projects: printed circuit boards, smart city infrastructure.
2012-04-23/26	11	China, Chengdu	107 delegates. Project launch regarding thermal conductivity of thermal shielding coatings.
/2013-06-01	12	Japan	Methods for measuring Young's modulus of thermal insulation films; photocatalyst testing methods; enhancing global supply chain efficiency through RTI (Returnable Transport Items); 3D digital design, manufacturing, characterization, and digital functional reference nanostructures.
2014-06-30/07-03	13	South Korea, Gyeongju	121 experts.
2015-06-19/18	14	China, Tsingtao	106 experts.
2016-07-11/13	15	Japan, Matsue	106 experts.
2017-07-03/05	16	South Korea, Jeju	112 experts.
2018-06-27/29	17	China, Hangzhou	122 experts.
2019-07-16/18	18	Japan, Takamatsu	123 experts, including ISO/REI and IEC/APRC.
2021-06-22/23	19	online	42 experts, virtual because of the COVID-19 pandemic.
2022-06-21/22	20	online	62 experts, virtual because of the COVID-19 pandemic.
2023-07-24/26	21	Japan, Tokyo+online	150 stakeholders, including ISO and IEC/APRC.
2024-07-15/17	22	South Korea, Seoul	127 attendees, including ISO/CS and IEC/APRC; discussed 9 projects including for freight containers, 18 new projects and forming working groups for them including for metaverse healthcare, participation in the IEC's MVDC project, and support for 6 ISO proposals including service robot test methods.
2025-07-21/23	23	China, Xi’an	166 participants, including ISO/CS and IEC/APRC, discussed cooperation in quantum technology, smart cities, circular economy, sustainable electrified transportation, pet products, and humanoid robots; enhancing cooperation under the frameworks of APEC and PASC.
2026-07-14/16	24	Japan, Hiroshima	Proposed.
