= Frecency =

Heuristic combining frequency and recency

In computing, frecency is any heuristic that combines the frequency and recency into a single measure.

== Heuristic ==
In its simplest form, the frequency and recency rating can be added to form a frecency rating. The ratings can be found by sorting items by most recent and most frequent respectively. A decayed calculation using logarithms can also be used.

== Examples ==
Some web browsers use frecency to predict the likelihood of revisiting a given web page or reusing a given HTTP cache entry

"Frecency is a score given to each unique URI in Places, encompassing bookmarks, history and tags. This score is determined by the amount of revisitation, the type of those visits, how recent they were, and whether the URI was bookmarked or tagged."

Frecency can be computed from a list of use dates, either as pro-actively while a user browses the web or as needed. Some frecency measures can also be computed in a rolling manner without storing such a list.

The ZFS filesystem uses this concept in its adaptive replacement cache (ARC) cache with a most recently used (MRU) and most frequently used (MFU) list.
