= Ronald Mace =

American architect

Ronald Lawrence Mace, FAIA (August 3, 1942 – June 29, 1998) was an American architect, product designer, educator, and consultant. He is best known for coining the term universal design and for his work advocating for people with disabilities.

== Early life and education ==
Ronald L. Mace was born in Jersey City, New Jersey, and grew up in Winston-Salem, North Carolina. He was the youngest of 2 children. In 1950, at the age of nine, he contracted polio, which led to him spending a year in the hospital. After contracting polio, he used a wheelchair for the rest of his life.

Mace studied architecture at the North Carolina State University's School of Design, where he encountered inaccessible facilities that limited his ability to use campus facilities. He graduated with a degree in architecture in 1966.

== Architectural and design career ==
After his graduation, Mace worked for four years as an architect before becoming involved in advocacy for accessibility in building design. He was instrumental in North Carolina's March 13, 1973, adoption of Chapter 11X, which was the first accessibility-focused building code to be adopted in the United States. This code served as a model for other states and was one of the foundations of the later movement to pass federal legislation prohibiting disability discrimination, including the Fair Housing Amendments Act of 1988 and the Americans with Disabilities Act of 1990. He also worked on the Rehabilitation Act of 1973. Mace was the president and registered agent of Barrier Free Environments, Inc., which was founded in 1974. It was a consulting firm focused on accessibility and universal design. He was also a Principal at BFE Architecture, P.A.

In conjunction with his alma mater, North Carolina State University's School of Design in Raleigh, he founded the Center for Accessible Housing in 1989. It later became the Center for Universal Design. This center, which received federal funding, became “a leading national and international resource for research and information on universal design in housing, products, and the built environment.” He was also a research professor in the Architecture Department at the School of Design.

== Honors and awards ==
Mace was a Fellow of the American Institute of Architects. In 1992, Mace received the Distinguished Service Award of the President of the United States from President Bush “for promoting dignity, equality, independence, and employment of disabled people.” In 1996, Mace received a Presidential Citation from the American Institute of Architects. He also received the 1997 North Carolina State University Distinguished Alumni Award.

== Personal life ==
Mace was married to Lockhart Follin-Mace, who served as the first executive director of the Governor's Advocacy Council for Persons with Disabilities from its creation in 1979. Follin-Mace died in 1991 from cancer.

Mace was survived by his nephew William H. Mace, III and his partner Joy Weeber.

== Death ==
Ronald L. Mace died at his home in Raleigh, North Carolina, on June 29, 1998. The cause of death was a heart arrhythmia caused by polio.
