= Universal design =

Design philosophy associated with accessibility and usability for everyone

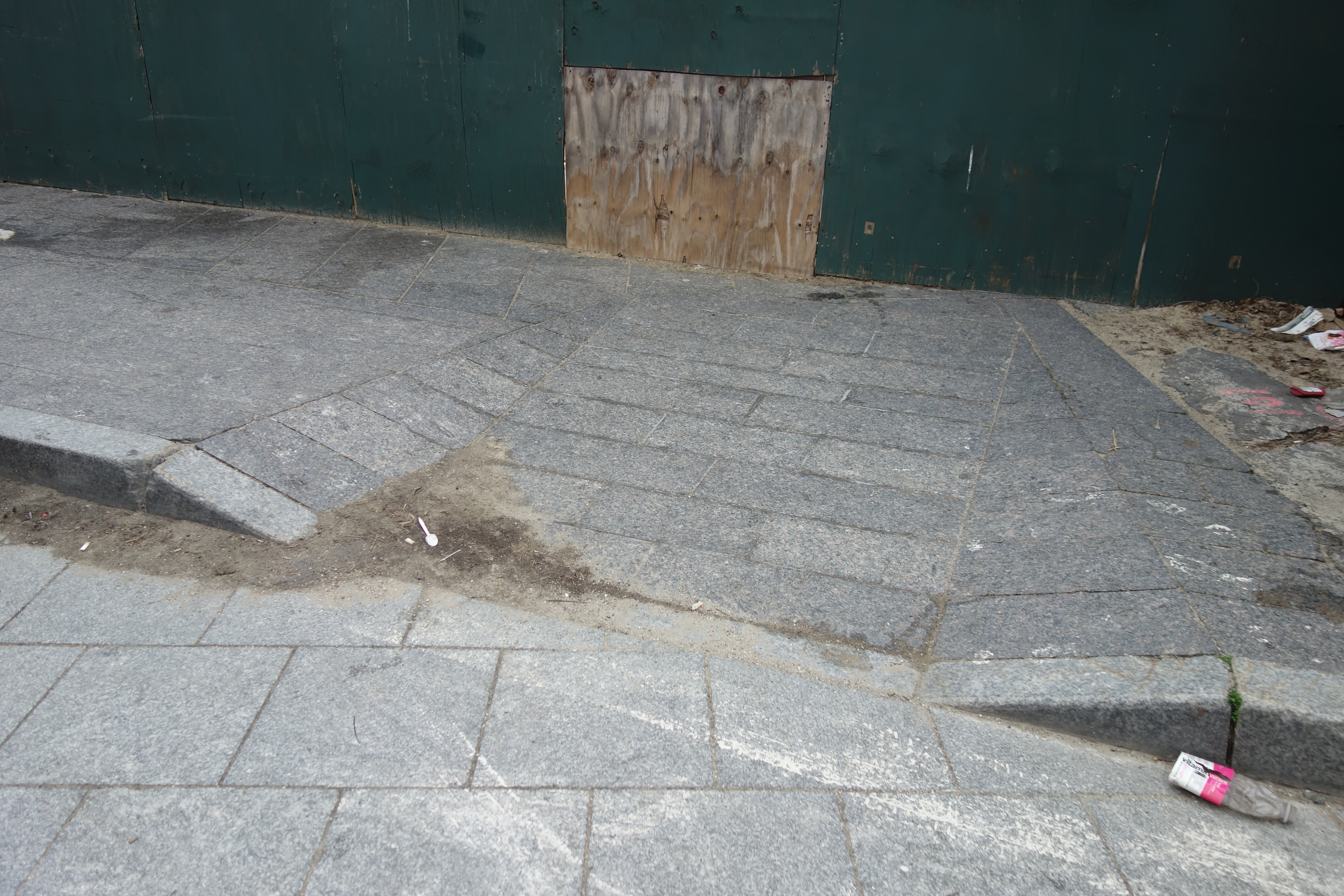
A curb cut is an example of universal design, making the curb accessible to those with and without wheelchairs.

Universal design is the design of buildings, products, or environments to make them accessible to all people, regardless of age, disability, or other factors. It emerged as a rights-based, anti-discrimination measure, which seeks to create design for all abilities. It addresses common barriers to participation by creating things that can be used by the maximum number of people possible. "When disabling mechanisms are to be replaced with mechanisms for inclusion, different kinds of knowledge are relevant for different purposes. As a practical strategy for inclusion, Universal Design involves dilemmas and often difficult priorities." Curb cuts or sidewalk ramps, which are essential for people in wheelchairs but also used by all, are a common example of universal design.

== History ==
The term universal design was coined by the architect Ronald Mace to describe the concept of designing all products and the built environment to be aesthetic and usable to the greatest extent possible by everyone, regardless of their age, ability, or status in life. However, due to some people having unusual or conflicting access needs, such as a person with low vision needing bright light and a person with photophobia needing dim light, universal design does not address absolutely every need for every person in every situation.

Universal design emerged from slightly earlier barrier-free concepts, the broader accessibility movement, and adaptive and assistive technology and also seeks to blend aesthetics into these core considerations. As life expectancy rises and modern medicine increases the survival rate of those with significant injuries, illnesses, and birth defects, there is a growing interest in universal design. There are many industries in which universal design is having strong market penetration, but there are many others in which it has not yet been adopted to any great extent. Universal design is also being applied to the design of technology, instruction, services, and other products and environments. Several different fields, such as engineering, architecture, and medicine collaborate in order to effectively create accessible environments that can lend to inclusion for a variety of disabilities. It can change the socio-material relationships people have with spaces and environments and create positive experiences for all kinds of abilities, which allows for meaningful participation across multiple demographics experiencing disability.

=== Barrier-free design ===
In 1960, specifications for barrier-free designs were published as a compendium of over 11 years of disability ergonomic research. In 1961, the American National Standard Institute (ANSI) A1171.1 specifications were published as the first Barrier Free Design standard. It presented criteria for designing facilities and programs for use by individuals with disabilities. The research started in 1949 at the University of Illinois Urbana-Champaign and continues to this day. The principal investigator, Dr. Timothy Nugent, who is credited in the 1961, 1971, and 1980 standards, also started the National Wheelchair Basketball Association.

The ANSI A117.1 standard was adopted by the US federal government's General Services Administration under the Uniform Federal Accessibility Standards in 1984, then in 1990 for Americans with Disabilities Act. The archived research documents are at the International Code Council - ANSI A117.1 division. Dr. Nugent made presentations around the globe in the late 1950s and 1960s, presenting the concept of independent functional participation for individuals with disabilities through program options and architectural design.

Another comprehensive publication by the Royal Institute of British Architects published three editions (1963, 1967, 1976 and 1997) of Designing for the Disabled by Selwyn Goldsmith (UK). These publications contain valuable empirical data and studies of individuals with disabilities. Both standards are excellent resources for the designer and builder.

Disability ergonomics should be taught to designers, engineers, and nonprofit executives to further the understanding of what makes an environment wholly tenable and functional for individuals with disabilities.

In October 2003, representatives from China, Japan, and South Korea met in Beijing at the Northeast Asia Standards Cooperation Forum and agreed to set up a committee to define common design standards for a wide range of products and services that are easy to understand and use. Their goal is to publish a standard in 2004 which covers, among other areas, standards on containers and wrappings of household goods (based on a proposal from experts in Japan), and standardization of signs for public facilities, a subject which was of particular interest to China as it prepared to host the 2008 Summer Olympics.

=== Design for All ===
Selwyn Goldsmith, author of Designing for the Disabled (1963), pioneered the concept of free access for people with disabilities. His most significant achievement was the creation of the dropped curb—now a standard feature of the built environment.

The term Design for All is used to describe a design philosophy targeting the use of products, services and systems by as many people as possible without the need for adaptation. "Design for All is design for human diversity, social inclusion and equality" (EIDD Stockholm Declaration, 2004). According to the European Commission, it "encourages manufacturers and service providers to produce new technologies for everyone: technologies that are suitable for the elderly and people with disabilities, as much as the teenage techno wizard." The origin of Design for All lies in the field of barrier-free accessibility for people with disabilities and the broader notion of universal design.

Design for All has been highlighted in Europe by the European Commission in seeking a more user-friendly society in Europe. Design for All is about ensuring that environments, products, services and interfaces work for people of all ages and abilities in different situations and under various circumstances.

Design for All has become a mainstream issue because of the aging of the population and its increasingly multiethnic composition. It follows a market approach and can reach out to a broader market. Easy-to-use, accessible, affordable products and services improve the quality of life of all citizens. Design for All permits access to the built environment, access to services and user-friendly products, which are not just a quality factor but a necessity for many aging or disabled persons. Including Design for All early in the design process is more cost-effective than making alterations after solutions are already on the market. The goal is best achieved by identifying and involving users ("stakeholders") in the decision-making processes that lead to drawing up the design brief and educating public and private sector decision-makers about the benefits to be gained from making coherent use of Design (for All) in a wide range of socio-economic situations.

==== In information and communication technology (ICT) ====
Design for All criteria are aimed at ensuring that everyone can participate in the Information society. The European Union refers to this under the terms "eInclusion" and "eAccessibility." A three-way approach is proposed: goods that can be accessed by nearly all potential users without modification or, failing that, products that are easy to adapt according to different needs, or using standardized interfaces that can be accessed simply by using assistive technology. To this end, manufacturers and service providers, especially, but not exclusively, in the Information and Communication Technologies (ICT), produce new technologies, products, services and applications for everyone.

==== European organizational networks ====
In Europe, people have joined in networks to promote and develop Design for All:

- The European Design for All eAccessibility Network was launched under the lead of the European Commission and the European Member States in 2002. It fosters Design for All for eInclusion, that is, creating an information society for all. It has national contact centres (NCCs) in almost all EU countries and more than 160 network members in national networks.
- EIDD - Design for All Europe is a NGO and a 100% self-financed European organization that covers the entire area of theory and practice of Design for All, from the built environment and tangible products to communication, service and system design. Originally set up in 1993 as the European Institute for Design and Disability (EIDD), to enhance the quality of life through Design for All, it changed its name in 2006 to bring it in line with its core business. EIDD - Design for All Europe disseminates the application of Design for All to business and administration communities previously unaware of its benefits and currently (2016) has 31 member organizations in 20 European countries.
- EuCAN - The European Concept for Accessibility Network started in 1984 as an open network of experts and advocates from all over Europe in order to promote and support the Design for All approach. The coordination work of EuCAN and the functioning of the network are mainly voluntary work. In 1999 the Luxembourg Disability Information and Meeting Centre (better known by its acronym "Info-Handicap") took over the coordination of the steering group, together with the implicit responsibility for the follow-up of the European Concept for Accessibility (ECA). The EuCAN publications—like ECA—aim to provide practical guidance. They are neither academic nor policy documents.

== Principles and goals ==
The Center for Universal Design at North Carolina State University expounded the following principles:

1. Equitable use
2. Flexibility in use
3. Simple and intuitive
4. Perceptible information
5. Tolerance for error
6. Low physical effort
7. Size and space for approach and use

Each principle is broader than those of accessible design or barrier-free design and contains a few brief guidelines that can be applied to design processes in any realm: physical or digital.

=== Goals ===
In 2012, the Center for Inclusive Design and Environmental Access at the University at Buffalo expanded the definition of the principles of universal design to include social participation and health and wellness. Rooted in evidence-based design, the 8 goals of universal design were also developed.

1. Body Fit
2. Comfort
3. Awareness
4. Understanding
5. Wellness
6. Social Integration
7. Personalization
8. Cultural Appropriateness

The first four goals are oriented to human performance: anthropometry, biomechanics, perception, cognition. Wellness bridges human performance and social participation. The last three goals address social participation outcomes. The definition and the goals are expanded upon in the textbook "Universal Design: Creating Inclusive Environments."

== The "barrier-free" concept ==
Barrier-free (バリアフリー, bariafurii) building modification consists of modifying buildings or facilities so that they can be used by people who are disabled or have physical impairments. The term is used primarily in Japan and other non-English-speaking countries (e.g., German: Barrierefreiheit; Finnish: esteettömyys), while in English-speaking countries, terms such as "accessibility" and "accessible" dominate in everyday use. An example of barrier-free design would be installing a ramp for wheelchair users alongside steps. In the late 1990s, any element that could make the use of the environment inconvenient for people with disabilities was (and still is) considered a barrier, for example, poor public street lighting. In the case of new buildings, however, the idea of barrier-free modification has largely been superseded by the concept of universal design, which seeks to design things from the outset to support easy access.

Freeing a building of barriers requires first recognizing the features that could form barriers for some people, and then thinking inclusively about the whole range of impairment and disability. It involves reviewing everything from the overall structure down to the smallest detail, and finally seeking feedback from users and learning from mistakes.

Barrier-free is also a term that applies to accessibility in situations where legal codes such as the Americans with Disabilities Act of 1990 applies. The process of adapting barrier-free public policies started when the Veterans Administration and the US President's Committee on Employment of the Handicapped noticed a large number of US citizens coming back from the Vietnam War injured and unable to navigate public spaces.

Singapore is an example of a country that has sought to implement barrier-free accessibility in housing estates. Within five years, all public housing estates in the country, all 7,800 blocks of apartments, have benefited from the program.

== Examples ==
=== Barrier-free design ===
The types of Universal Design elements vary depending on the targeted population and the space. For example, in public spaces, universal design elements are often broad areas of accessibility, while in private spaces, design elements address the specific requirements of the resident. Examples of these design elements are varied and leverage different approaches for different effects. Some examples include:

=== Communication ===
Universal design in communication encompasses a wide range of approaches. Environments and products should provide bright and appropriate lighting, including task lighting, as well as signs with light-on-dark visual contrast to aid those with low vision. Visual and auditory outputs should be redundant with one another for example, information presented on a visual display should also be available in auditory form, and vice versa. Contrast controls on visual output, volume controls, speed controls, and a choice of language on speech output all contribute to flexibility for diverse users. Meaningful icons accompanied by text labels and clear lines of sight help reduce dependence on any single sensory channel.

Web pages should provide alternative text to describe images, and instructional material should be presented both orally and visually. Equipment control buttons should include large-print labels that can be distinguished by touch. Additional features such as audio description, closed captioning, and quiet zones in educational and work places further support communication access for all users.

=== Access and mobility ===
Public transit systems can be made more accessible by using low-floor buses that "kneel" bringing their front end to ground level to eliminate gaps and by equipping vehicles with ramps rather than on-board lifts. Building entrances should be smooth and at ground level, without stairs, and interior surfaces should be stable, firm, and slip-resistant per ASTM 2047, requiring low rolling force less than 5 lb (2.3 kg) per 120 lb (54 kg) to traverse. Wide interior doors of at least 3 feet (0.91 m), along with appropriately sized hallways and alcoves featuring 60" × 60" (152.4 cm × 152.4 cm) turning spaces at doors and dead-ends, accommodate wheelchair users and others with mobility needs. Functional clearances for approach and use of all elements and components, as well as ramp access in swimming pools, further extend equitable access across a range of environments.

=== Ease of use ===
Ease of use is achieved through design choices that minimize the physical effort and dexterity required to operate everyday components. Lever handles on doors and lever or button faucets, for instance, replace twisting knobs and can be operated with a single hand using a closed fist an important consideration for people with limited grip strength or wrist mobility. Similarly, operable components, including fire alarm pull stations, should not require tight grasping, pinching, or twisting of the wrist, and should require less than 5 lb (2.3 kg) of force to operate. Light switches with large flat panels are preferable to small toggle switches, and buttons and controls should be distinguishable by touch.

Gesture-enabled spaces may in future allow users to control temperature, lighting, and other environmental qualities without physical contact. At a more immediate level, cabinets with pull-out shelves, kitchen counters at variable heights to accommodate different tasks and postures, and adjustable chairs and workbenches all support users across a wide range of physical abilities, including wheelchair users.

=== Design for All ===
The book Diseños para todos/Designs for All, published in 2008 by Optimastudio with the support of Spain's Ministry of Education, Social Affairs and Sports and CEAPAT, presented a range of everyday objects as examples of Design for All, including the audiobook, the automatic door, the electric toothbrush, the flexible drinking straw, Google, the low-floor bus, tactile paving, the trolley case (roll-along suitcase), Q-Drums, and Velcro. Additional items that benefit people with mobility limitations include the washlet, wireless remote-controlled power sockets, and wireless remote-controlled window shades.

== Laws, policies and standards ==
=== National legislation ===
- Brazil - Lei Federal 13.146/2015, a Lei Brasileira de Inclusão da Pessoa com Deficiência (Estatuto da Pessoa com Deficiência).
- Chile - Ley nº 20.422, "ESTABLECE NORMAS SOBRE IGUALDAD DE OPORTUNIDADES E INCLUSIÓN SOCIAL DE PERSONAS CON DISCAPACIDAD."
- U.S. - Americans with Disabilities Act of 1990 (ADA) and Section 508 Amendment to the Rehabilitation Act of 1973. The ADA is a law focusing on all building aspects, products and design, which is based on the concept of respecting human rights. It does not contain design specifications as such. Other disability rights laws in the United States include:
  - Fair Housing Act
  - Voting Accessibility for the Elderly and Handicapped Act
  - Telecommunications Act
  - Air Carrier Access Act
  - National Voter Registration Act
  - Civil Rights for Institutionalized Persons Act
  - Individuals with Disabilities Education Act
  - Architectural Barriers Act
- Italy - legge n. 13/1989; D.M. n. 236/1989; legge n. 104/1992; D.P.R. n. 503/1996; D.P.R. n. 380/2001 (artt. 77–82)
- Australia - Disability Discrimination Act 1992
- India - Persons with Disabilities (Equal Opportunities, Protection of Rights & Full Participation) Act, 1995
- United Kingdom - Disability Discrimination Act 1995, Disability Discrimination Act 2005 and Equality Act 2010
- Ireland - Disability Act 2005
- France - Loi n°2005-102 du 11 février 2005 pour l'égalité des droits et des chances, la participation et la citoyenneté des personnes handicapées (Act n°2005-102 of 11 February 2005 for equality of rights and of opportunities, for participation and for citizenship of people with disabilities)
- South Korea - Prohibition of Discrimination Against Persons with Disabilities, 2008
- Norway - Discrimination and Accessibility Act of 2009
- Vietnam - National Law on Persons with Disability, enacted 17 June 2010.
- Canada - Accessible Canada Act, enacted 11 July 2019.

=== Policies ===
- Ontario, Canada "Accessibility for Ontarians with Disabilities Act, 2005". 15 December 2009. Archived from the original on 14 April 2021.
- United States of America. "Universal Design and Accessibility". Section508.gov. General Services Administration. March 2022. Archived from the original on 29 June 2022.
- Mexico City, Mexico. "Claudia Sheinbaum Pardo's Plan for Government."
  - Document describing 12 points of intention for the government, the following are directly related to accessibility in Mexico City
    - 6. Public Spaces
    - 7. Mobility
    - 9. Human rights and equality
    - 10. Equality and inclusion
- Mexico City, Mexico. "Plaza Pública." Reconstruction Commission.
  - Following the 2017 earthquake that destroyed a lot of Mexico City, this policy was released that involved the public in the rebuilding process, creating a good platform for requesting accessibility and universal design.
- Madrid, Spain. "PLAN ESTRATÉGICO DE DERECHOS HUMANOS DEL AYUNTAMIENTO DE MADRID."
  - A 19-point plan describing the rights of elderly citizens, where the following are directly related to accessibility
    - 11. Right to live free from discrimination and violence
    - 19. Right to a sustainable city environment that provides mobility and quality of life

=== Standards ===
The International Organization for Standardization, the European Committee for Electrotechnical Standardization, and the International Electrotechnical Commission have developed the following standards:

- CEN/CENELEC Guide 6 – Guidelines for standards developers to address the needs of older persons and persons with disabilities (Identical to ISO/IEC Guide 71, but free for download)
- ISO 21542:2021 – Building construction — Accessibility and usability of the built environment (available in English and French)
- ISO 20282-1:2006 – Ease of operation of everyday products — Part 1: Context of use and user characteristics. ISO 20282 is based on ISO 9241: Ergonomics of Human System Interaction and applies the wider principles to "the user interfaces of everyday products".
- ISO/TS 20282-2:2013 – Usability of consumer products and products for public use — Part 2: Summative test method, published 1 August 2013

== Funding agencies ==
The Rehabilitation Engineering Research Center (RERC) on universal design in the Built Environment funded by what is now the National Institute on Disability, Independent Living, and Rehabilitation Research completed its activities on September 29, 2021. Twenty RERCs are currently funded. The Center for Inclusive Design and Environmental Access at the University at Buffalo is a current recipient.

== Common shortcomings ==
=== Aswan case study ===
One study conducted in Aswan, Egypt, published in the Journal of Engineering and Applied Science, aimed to explore the accessibility in three administrative buildings in the area. They were looking for universal design in entrances and exits, circulation of traffic within the building, and wayfinding within the building's services. They decided to focus their case study on administrative buildings in order to exemplify universal design that granted access for all citizens to all locations. Among the buildings, there were some shared issues. The researchers found that vertical movement was difficult for disabled patrons, given that there were no elevators. There was also no dropped curb, no Braille system, and the handles of doors were difficult to open, and there were no sensory indicators such as sounds or visual signs.

This case highlights the importance of demographics when considering needs for universal design. Over 60% of the citizens who use this building on a daily basis are elderly, but there aren't accommodations that are helpful to their capabilities. Along with the lack of tactile features to guide the visually impaired, the space within the building is very congested, especially for one who may not have full physical capabilities and must use a wheelchair. The circulation suffers as a result, as well as the wayfinding in the structure.

=== Gwangju case study ===
Although there have been attempts to create more accessible public and outdoor spaces, the restorations made have ultimately failed to meet the needs of disabled people and elderly.

=== Social model of disability ===
Within disability studies lies the social model of disability, which states that the environment is the disabling factor upon a human. The flaw within the social model of disability is that no matter how universal a design is made out to be, the impairment a human is disabled by will not go away. For example, adding an automatic door opener will not heal someone's broken arm. Universal design does not "fix" a problem relating to disability, rather helps to better equip areas to be accessible to all regardless of what factors may characterize their every day life.

== Bibliography ==
- Vega, Eugenio (2022). Crónica del siglo de la peste : pandemias, discapacidad y diseño (in Spanish). Getafe, Madrid: Experimenta. ISBN 978-84-18049-73-6. OCLC 1298550791.
- Williamson, Bess (2020). Accessible America : a history of disability and design. New York. ISBN 978-1-4798-0249-4. OCLC 1126545082.

== See also ==
- Autism friendly
- Curb cut effect
- Development plan
- Disability rights movement
- Inclusion (disability rights)
- Inclusive design
- Right to mobility
- Sensory friendly
- Transgenerational design
- Universal usability
- Urban planning
